= List of crossings of the River Weaver =

List of crossings of the River Weaver north of Nantwich. Bridges which only access the island between original course and Weaver Navigation are not included.

Key to heritage status
Status	Criteria
I	Grade I listed. Bridge of exceptional interest, sometimes considered to be internationally important
II*	Grade II* listed. Particularly important bridge of more than special interest
II	Grade II listed. Bridge of national importance and special interest

Crossing	Date	Coordinates	Heritage status	Locality	Notes	Image
Shrewbridge Road		53.0547°N 2.5243°W	-	Nantwich	A530	
Railway Bridge		53.0617°N 2.5256°W	-	Nantwich	Welsh Marches line	Railway_bridge_over_the_Weaver_in_Nantwich_-_geograph.org.uk_-_4702888
Nantwich Riverside South Footbridge		53.0625°N 2.5257°W	-	Nantwich		Ducks_by_the_pedestrian_bridge_-_geograph.org.uk_-_256873
Nantwich Riverside Footbridges		53.0659°N 2.5249°W	-	Nantwich	Several bridges accessing Mill Island	Footbridge_over_the_River_Weaver_-_geograph.org.uk_-_5655437
Nantwich Bridge	Early 19th Cent	53.0676°N 2.5245°W	II	Nantwich		Nantwich_Bridge_Welsh_Row
Sir Thomas Fairfax Bridge		53.0698°N 2.5259°W	-	Nantwich		Sir Thomas Fairfax Bridge over the Weaver - geograph.org.uk - 344916
Nantwich Riverside North Footbridges		53.0727°N 2.5233°W	-	Nantwich	3 Footbridges	Cycle_bridge_over_the_Weaver_-_geograph.org.uk_-_344878
Beam Bridge		53.0778°N 2.5222°W	-	Nantwich	Barony Road B5074	Beam Bridge north side (geograph 7439715)
Nantwich Bypass Bridge		53.0789°N 2.5196°W	-	Nantwich	A51	
Rail Bridge		53.107°N 2.4986°W	-	Crewe	North Wales Main Line	Old_Bridge_over_the_River_Weaver_-_geograph.org.uk_-_2762166
Church Minshull Aqueduct	1833	53.1267°N 2.5026°W	II	Church Minshull	Shropshire Union Canal	Shropshire Union aqueduct, Minshull Vernon
Farm Access Bridge		53.1369°N 2.5015°W	-	Church Minshull	Old Hoolgrave access	Bridge over the River Weaver, Church Minshull - geograph.org.uk - 5643099
Church Minshull Bridge		53.1419°N 2.4985°W	II	Church Minshull	Cross Lane	Church_Minshull_Bridge
Footbridge		53.1629°N 2.4915°W	-	Wimboldsley		Footbridge_over_the_River_Weaver_-_geograph.org.uk_-_2697081
Winsford High St Roundabout		53.1925°N 2.5171°W	-	Winsford	2 Bridges	Winsford_Road_Bridge_-_geograph.org.uk_-_2424899
Weaver Parkway Footbridge		53.2145°N 2.5233°W	-	Winsford		Weaver_Navigation_-_geograph.org.uk_-_6246613
Vale Royal Locks	1890	53.229°N 2.5401°W	II	Hartford	Footbridge on River, locks on Navigation	Vale_Royal_Large_Lock
Vale Railway Viaduct	1837	53.2316°N 2.5372°W	II	Hartford	West Coast Main Line	River_Weaver_rail_bridge_-_geograph.org.uk_-_4149509
Hartford Bridge		53.2378°N 2.5303°W	-	Hartford	A556	Hartford_Bridge_-_geograph.org.uk_-_2424824
Hunt's Locks	1890	53.2523°N 2.5175°W	II	Northwich	Locks on Navigation, Riversdale Bridge on River.	The_locks,_Northwich_-_geograph.org.uk_-_21868
Weaver Railway Viaduct	1860	53.2547°N 2.5141°W	II	Northwich	Mid-Cheshire line	Northwich_-_Hunts_Weir_framed_by_railway_viaduct_-_geograph.org.uk_-_2902809
Hayhurst Bridge	1899	53.2582°N 2.5164°W	II	Northwich	Swing Bridge	Hayhurst_Swing_Bridge,_Northwich
Northwich Town Bridge	1899	53.2605°N 2.516°W	II	Northwich	Swing Bridge	Town_Bridge_-_geograph.org.uk_-_4012869
Winnington Turn Bridge	1909	53.2705°N 2.5388°W	II	Winnington	Swing Bridge	Winnington_Turn_Bridge
Acton Bridge		53.2801°N 2.6005°W	-		A49 Swing Bridge	A49_crossing_R_Weaver_at_Acton_Bridge_-_geograph.org.uk_-_5617274
Dutton Locks	1874	53.2876°N 2.6218°W	II		Dutton Horse Bridge on River, locks on Navigation	Towpath_bridge,_below_Dutton_Locks_-_geograph.org.uk_-_5153705
Dutton Viaduct	1837	53.2826°N 2.628°W	II*		West Coast Main Line	The_Dutton_Viaduct_-_geograph.org.uk_-_4071704
Frodsham Bridge	1850	53.3009°N 2.7067°W	II	Frodsham	Original River	Frodsham_Bridge
Sutton Weaver Swing Bridge		53.3048°N 2.6993°W	-	Frodsham	Weaver Navigation	Sutton_Weaver_swing_bridge_(13)
Frodsham Viaduct	1850	53.3025°N 2.7088°W	II	Frodsham	Original River	175101_on_Frodsham_Viaduct
Frodsham Navigation Viaduct	1850	53.306°N 2.7013°W	II	Frodsham	Weaver Navigation	The_Welsh_Mountaineer_crosses_the_Weaver_Navigation_at_Frodsham,_hauled_by_ex-LMS_Class_8F_2-8-0_No._48151
Weaver Viaduct	1971	53.3082°N 2.7114°W	-	Frodsham	M56	M56_crossing_the_Weaver_Navigation_-_geograph.org.uk_-_5159471
