= Dutton Horse Bridge =

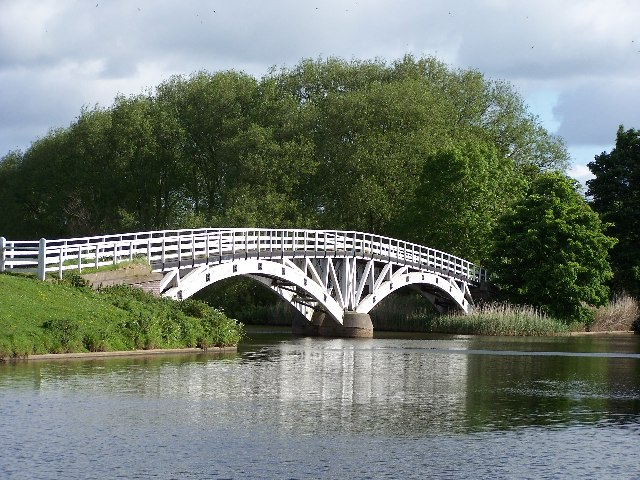
- Dutton Horse Bridge
- Coordinates: 53°17′10″N 2°37′30″W
- Crosses: River Weaver
- Locale: Acton Bridge, Cheshire
- Official name: Dutton Lower Horse Bridge (Note: A footbridge also known as Dutton Horse Bridge was built upstream in 2010.)
- Other name(s): Lower Dutton Horse Bridge
- Heritage status: Grade II listed

Characteristics
- Design: John Arthur Saner

History
- Opened: 1919

Dutton Horse Bridge is a timber twin-span footbridge across part of the Weaver navigation, near the villages of Acton Bridge and Dutton in Cheshire, England. The bridge is located at SJ 583 767, between the Dutton Locks and Dutton Viaduct. It carries the towpath across a subsidiary channel used to regulate the water level, at the point where it rejoins the main river.

The bridge dates from 1915–1919 and is by John Arthur Saner. It is recorded in the National Heritage List for England as a designated Grade II listed building; the listing describes it as "an elegant structure in the functional waterways tradition". The bridge is one of the earliest remaining examples of a laminated timber structure, and is also believed to be the sole laminated greenheart timber bridge in the country.

== History ==
J. A. Saner, the bridge's designer, was chief engineer to the Weaver Navigation Trust from 1888 to 1934. He was responsible for many other innovative structures on the Weaver, including Northwich's Hayhurst Bridge and Town Bridge of 1899, believed to be the two earliest electrically operated swing bridges in Britain, as well as the electrification of the Anderton Boat Lift. Work on Dutton Horse Bridge commenced in 1915 (engineering drawings from that date were archived by British Waterways), and was completed in June 1919. The bridge was renovated in the 1990s, when some of the submerged greenheart timber was found to be still intact.

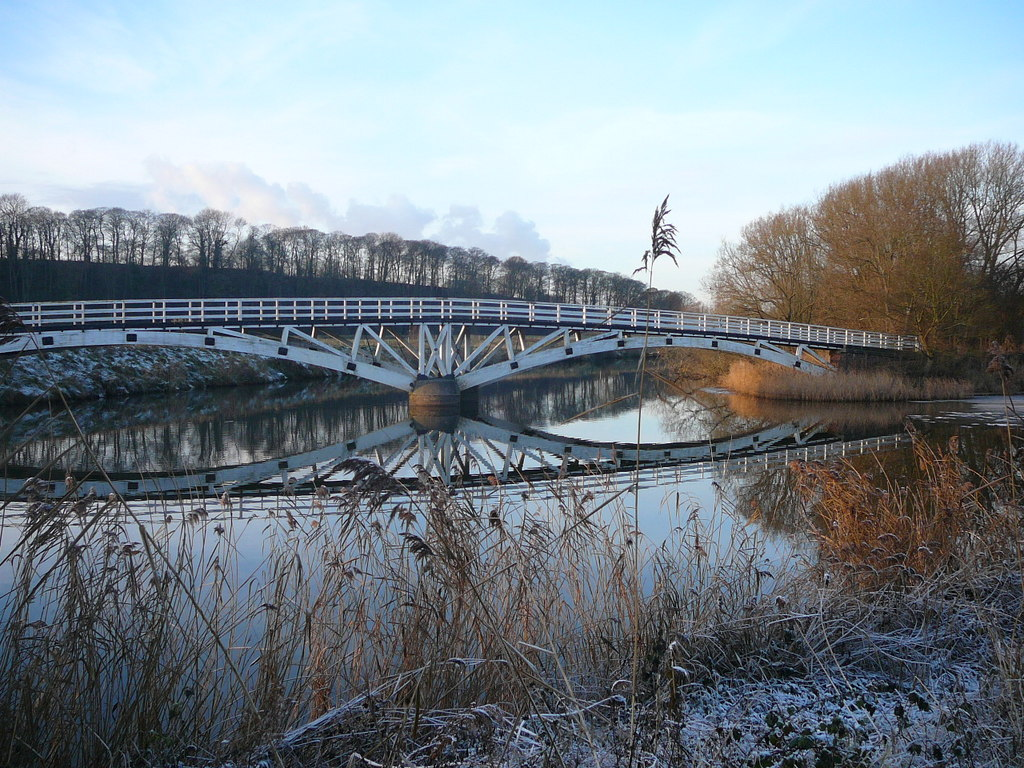
Side view showing triangulated struts

== Description ==
The bridge is constructed predominantly of greenheart timber. It has two spans, one of 100 ft 7 in (30.7 m) and the other of 101 ft 7 in (31.0 m). Each span consists of paired semi-elliptical timber arches of mechanically laminated timber, strengthened with triangulated timber struts, which also support the platform. The paired arches are braced by cast-iron struts.

The bridge platform is 8 ft (2.4 m) wide with a gentle arch. It has simple timber guard rails of the post-and-rail type. The deck was originally constructed of asphalt-coated timber slats. The central pier rests on two connected cylindrical columns of concrete-filled brick. The abutments are built of brick capped with concrete copings; they rest on timber piles. The timberwork is painted white and the ironwork black.

== Modern usage ==
The Weaver Valley is being redeveloped to promote tourism. A recreation area at Dutton Locks was created in 2002, including a bench by local artist Phil Bews to encourage tourists to enjoy the views towards the bridge and the nearby viaduct. The towpath crossing the bridge is a bridleway, which forms part of the Aston Ring Bridleway.

== See also ==
- Acton swing bridge, nearby bridge also by Saner
- Listed buildings in Dutton, Cheshire
