= Dutton Park Farm Nature Reserve =

Nature reserve in Cheshire, England

Coordinates: 53.283°N 2.633°W

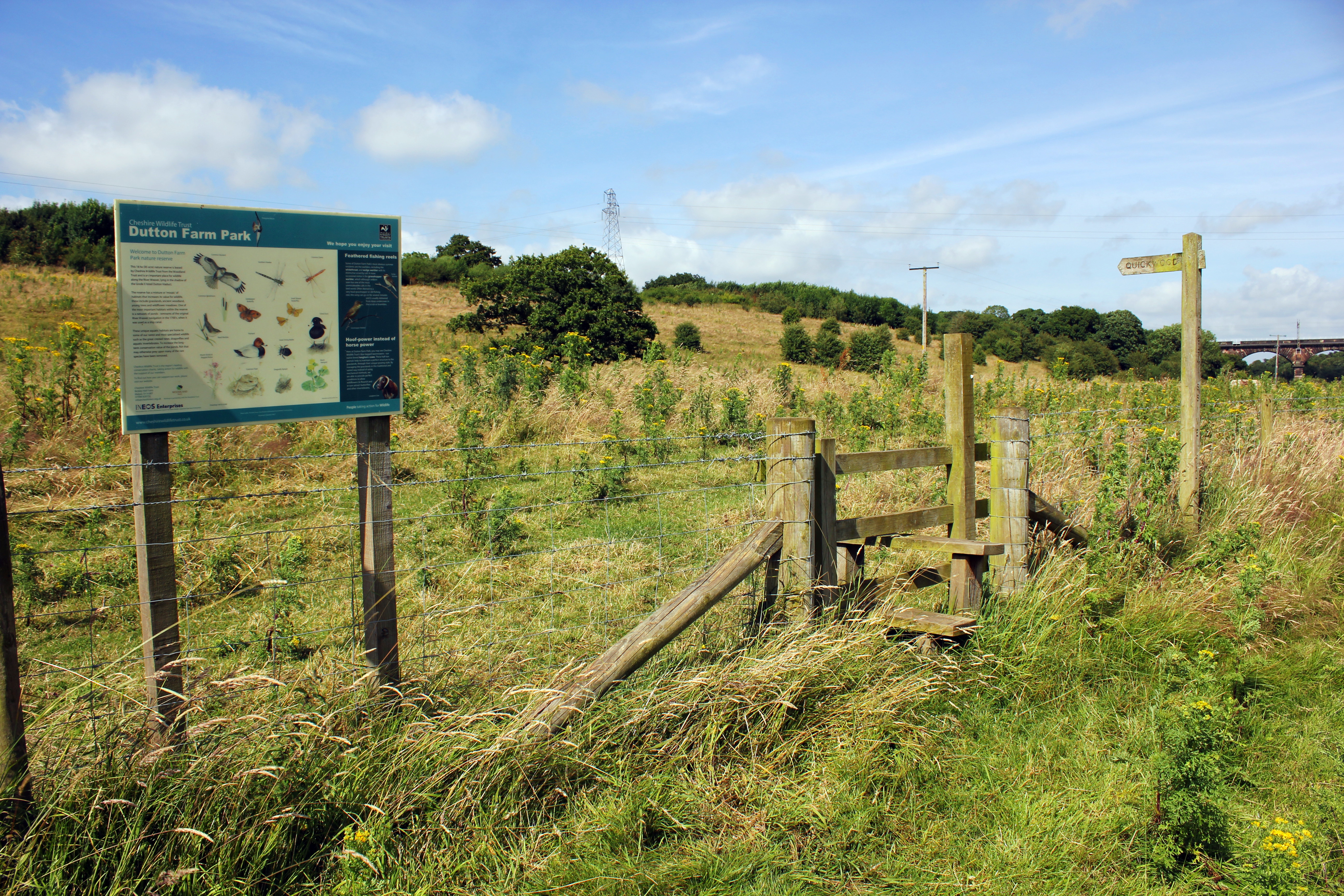
Entrance to the reserve

Dutton Park Farm Nature Reserve is an 18-hectare (44-acre) nature reserve northwest of Weaverham, Cheshire, England. It is managed by the Cheshire Wildlife Trust.

It lies below the Grade II* listed Dutton Viaduct and is looked after by the Cheshire Wildlife Trust in partnership with the Woodland Trust. The reserve's many pools and ponds are remnants of the original course of the River Weaver, and the new course of the Weaver now flows past the reserve.

Peregrine falcons have been known to use the viaduct as a vantage point, and kestrels and buzzards are regular visitors. The reserve's habitats of wildflower meadows benefit from regular grazing by Longhorn cattle, and the ponds have had their fish removed to allow aquatic wildlife to flourish. The scrub along the reserve fringe supports several summer migrants including whitethroats, sedge warblers, and the grasshopper warbler.
