= Listed buildings in Acton Bridge =

Acton Bridge is a civil parish in Cheshire West and Chester, England. It is mainly rural and contains the village of Acton Bridge. The parish is traversed by the River Weaver and Weaver Navigation in an east–west direction, the West Coast Main Line in a north–south direction, and the A49 road runs from northwest to southeast. It contains nine buildings that are recorded in the National Heritage List for England as designated listed buildings. Two of these are listed at Grade II*, and the other seven at Grade II. Most of the buildings are houses or farm buildings, but the list also includes a railway viaduct, a lock on the Weaver Navigation, and a guidepost.

== Key ==
Grade	Criteria
II*	Particularly important buildings of more than special interest.
II	Buildings of national importance and special interest.

== Listed buildings ==
Name and location	Photograph	Date	Notes	Grade
Hall Green Farmhouse; 53.2740°N 2.6065°W	—	Late 16th or early 17th century	This is basically a timber-framed house with a hall and a cross-wing, later enclosed in brick. Inside the house are mural paintings of Cheshire scenes.	II*
Pepper Street; 53.2721°N 2.6055°W		Early 17th century	Originally a farmhouse, then three cottages, and then converted into a house but damaged by a fire in 1953. It is timber-framed on a stone base, with a plaster infill. The roof is tiled.	II
Wolverley; 53.2762°N 2.6101°W	—	Early 17th century	Additions and alterations have been carried out since. It is a long two-storey brick house with a slate roof. It has a late 18th-century doorcase with a later stone portico.	II
Wall Hill Farmhouse; 53.2738°N 2.6062°W	—	Early 19th century	A two-storey symmetrical farmhouse in orange brick with a Welsh slate roof. The windows are sashes.	II
Ash House; 53.2749°N 2.6205°W	—	Early–mid-19th century	A two-storey symmetrical farmhouse in red brick on a stone plinth with a Welsh slate roof. At the entrance is a fluted Doric doorcase with a fanlight.	II
Shippon, Hall Green Farm; 53.2742°N 2.6066°W	—	Early–mid-19th century	A rectangular two-storey brick building with a Welsh slate roof. The south front is in six bays.	II
Dutton Railway Viaduct; 53.2829°N 2.6286°W		1836	Built by Joseph Locke and George Stephenson for the Grand Junction Railway in sandstone. It consists of 20 arches crossing the River Weaver.	II*
Dutton Locks; 53.2876°N 2.6218°W		1874	A pair of sandstone locks on the Weaver Navigation, wide enough to accommodate 500-ton sea-going ships.	II
Guidepost; 53.27369°N 2.60647°W		Late 19th century	A cast iron octagonal post with a ball finial and fingerplates giving directions.	II

== See also ==
- Listed buildings in Crowton
- Listed buildings in Dutton
- Listed buildings in Little Leigh
- Listed buildings in Weaverham
