= Listed buildings in Little Leigh =

Little Leigh is a civil parish in Cheshire West and Chester, England. Other than the village of Little Leigh, the parish is entirely rural. It contains eleven buildings that are recorded in the National Heritage List for England as designated listed buildings, all of which are at Grade II. This grade is the lowest of the three gradings given to listed buildings and is applied to "buildings of national importance and special interest". The A49 road runs to the west of the parish, the A533 road to the northeast, and the River Weaver to the south. Traversing the parish is the Trent and Mersey Canal. Four of the listed buildings are associated with the canal: two bridges, an aqueduct, and a milepost. The other listed buildings consist of a former farmhouse, now a public house, with two of its associated buildings, another farmhouse, a cottage, and a church with its lychgate.

== Buildings ==
Name and location	Photograph	Date	Notes
Holly Bush Cottage; 53.2884°N 2.5934°W	—	Early 17th century	The cottage was extended in the 19th and 20th centuries. It is partly timber-framed with brick nogging, and partly built in brick. The roof is thatched. The cottage has a single storey with attics, with a five-bay front. The windows are horizontal-sliding sashes.
Holly Bush Inn; 53.2886°N 2.5929°W	—	Early 17th century	This was built as a farmhouse and later converted into a public house. Extensions were added in 1848 and during the 20th century. It is timber-framed with brick nogging on a stone plinth. The roof is thatched. The building is in two storeys, and has a three-bay front with casement windows.
Easy Heath Farmhouse; 53.2813°N 2.5737°W	—	17th century	The farmhouse is timber-framed with brick nogging on a stone plinth, and has repairs in brick. The roof has corrugated asbestos over thatching. The building is in a single storey with an attic, and is in three bays. The windows are two-light casements with a half-dormer above.
Bradley Meadow Bridge; 53.27445°N 2.58670°W		1777	An accommodation bridge crossing the Trent and Mersey Canal designed by James Brindley. It is constructed in brick with stone dressings and has a low segmental arch. At the level of the roadway is a dentilled brick band, above which is a plain parapet with stone coping.
Aqueduct; 53.27535°N 2.57795°W	—	1777	An aqueduct carrying the Trent and Mersey Canal over access to a farm, designed by James Brindley. It is constructed in brick, with a barrel vault under the canal, and triangular buttresses at each end. There is a plain parapet on the south side, but not on the north.
Mile post 53.27406°N 2.58596°W		1819	This is in cast iron, and consists of a circular post with a moulded head, and two plates carrying the distances from Preston Brook and Shardlow in embossed characters.
Willowgreen Bridge; 53.28173°N 2.59526°W		Early to mid-19th century	An accommodation bridge crossing the Trent and Mersey Canal. The brick abutments carry cast iron beams with the name of the foundry. The brick sides of roadway have a plain parapet with rounded brick coping.
Barn, Holly Bush Inn; 53.2884°N 2.5927°W	—	1844	The former barn is constructed in brick with Welsh slate roofs. Its features include doorways, oculi, and breathers (gaps in the brickwork) in varying patterns.
Granary, Holly Bush Inn; 53.2882°N 2.5928°W	—	1844 (probable)	The former granary is constructed in brick with Welsh slate roofs. It contains two doorways; above one is a three-light sash window.
St Michael and All Angels Church; 53.2790°N 2.5783°W		1878–79	Designed by Edmund Kirby, the church is constructed in orange brick with terracotta dressings. At the junction of the nave and chancel is a flèche with wooden louvred bell-openings on each face, lucarnes, a lead finial and a weathercock. Inside the church, the terracotta reredos is also by Kirby. The stained glass includes a window by Trena Cox.
Lychgate; 53.27875°N 2.57842°W		1882	Sited at the entrance to the churchyard, this is timber-framed on a stone base with a hipped roof in Lakeland slate. The bressumer is inscribed with the date and a text.

== See also ==
- Listed buildings in Acton Bridge
- Listed buildings in Barnton
- Listed buildings in Comberbach
- Listed buildings in Dutton
- Listed buildings in Weaverham
- Listed buildings in Whitley
