= Listed buildings in Dutton, Cheshire =

Dutton is a civil parish in Cheshire West and Chester, England. It contains the village of Dutton, but is otherwise rural. Important transport links pass through the parish. The West Coast Main Line runs through in a north–south direction. Dutton Viaduct and the Weaver Junction (where the Liverpool branch divides from the main line) are in the parish. The Trent and Mersey Canal runs through it in a northwest–southeast direction, and enters the south portal of the Preston Brook Tunnel. The A533 road traverses the parish in a similar direction. In the southern part of the parish, running east–west, is the River Weaver and the Weaver Navigation. Included in the parish are 22 buildings that are recorded in the National Heritage List for England as designated listed buildings. Some of the buildings are houses, and others are associated with the Trent and Mersey Canal and the Weaver Navigation.

== Key ==
Grade	Criteria
Grade II*	Particularly important buildings of more than special interest.
Grade II	Buildings of national importance and special interest.

== Listed buildings ==
Name and location	Photograph	Date	Notes	Grade
Done's Green Farm; 53.2948°N 2.5932°W	—	Early 17th century (probable)	Basically a timber-framed building, which is largely replaced in brick. It has a thatched roof covered by corrugated asbestos. The windows in the lower storey are casements, and above they are horizontally sliding sashes.	II
New Brook House; 53.2973°N 2.6254°W	—	Early 17th century (probable)	Part of the house is probably basically timber-framed. It is in two wings, with some rebuilding in brick. The left wing has three storeys; the cross wing has three storeys and an attic. The exterior is rendered, and the roofs are slated.	II
Brook Farmhouse; 53.3144°N 2.6122°W	—	17th century	This is probably basically a timber-framed building, the exterior of which has been rendered and the interior plastered. It has a thatched roof covered by corrugated asbestos. The house is in 1½ storeys, and has two wings.	II
Dutton Lodge Farmhouse; 53.2955°N 2.6306°W	—	c. 1700	The building is in two wings, partly timber-framed, and partly in brick. It was extended in the 19th century with recasing in Vernacular Revival style. The building is partly in two, and partly in three, storeys.	II
Bartington Hall Farmhouse; 53.2836°N 2.6011°W		Early 18th century (probable)	A brick house in two storeys plus attics with a slate roof. Five stone steps lead up to a Neoclassical doorway with fluted Ionic pilasters, a pulvinated frieze and dentilled pediment. The windows are 16-pane sashes.	II
Marsh House; 53.3067°N 2.6017°W	—	Early 18th century (probable)	A two-storey brick farmhouse with slate roofs. It is in three bays with a pedimented doorcase, and has three-light casement windows.	II
Bridge number 210; 53.2846°N 2.60045°W		1777	An accommodation bridge designed by Thomas Telford in brown brick with stone copings.	II
Bridge number 211; 53.2908°N 2.6130°W		1777	An accommodation bridge designed by Thomas Telford in brown brick. It has stone copings, springers and quoins.	II
Dutton Dock; 53.3031°N 2.6374°W	—	1777	A dry dock for the Trent and Mersey Canal, with a brick floor and walls and stone coping. The London and North Western Railway added a shed and store room in the late 19th century, which are included in the listing.	II
Stop Lock; 53.3036°N 2.6386°W		1777	A stop lock on the Trent and Mersey Canal, with stone walls and timber lock gates, and negligible fall in water levels.	II
South portal, Preston Brook Tunnel; 53.3048°N 2.6405°W		c. 1777	This is at the point where the Trent and Mersey Canal enters the Preston Brook Tunnel from the south. It was designed by James Brindley, and is in brick with sandstone wing walls.	II
Fairlawns; 53.2890°N 2.5933°W	—	c. 1800	A two-storey brick house with slate roofs. Single-storey wings have been added to each side. The windows are casements.	II
Sundial; 53.28862°N 2.59295°W	—	1815	A sundial in the garden of the Holly Bush public house. It is in sandstone, and consists of a circular shaft on a square plinth and a circular base, carrying a square cap with a copper plate and a damaged gnomon.	II
Milepost; 53.30063°N 2.63443°W	—	1819	A cast iron milepost consisting of a circular tapered stem with a domed cap, and a plate indicating the distance from Preston Brook as 1 mile and from Shardlow as 91 miles.	II
Milepost; 53.29988°N 2.63349°W	—	1819	A cast iron milepost consisting of a circular tapered stem with a domed cap, and a plate indicating the distance from Preston Brook as 2 miles and from Shardlow as 90 miles.	II
Milepost; 53.28452°N 2.60034°W		1819	A cast iron milepost consisting of a circular tapered stem with a domed cap, and a plate indicating the distance from Preston Brook as 3 miles and from Shardlow as 89 miles.	II
Dutton Viaduct; 53.2829°N 2.6286°W		1836	Built by Joseph Locke and George Stephenson for the Grand Junction Railway in sandstone. It consists of 20 arches crossing the River Weaver.	II*
Pickerings Bridge Cottage; 53.2821°N 2.6380°W		c. 1850	Originally a pair of cottages, later a house. It is a two-storey brick building with stone dressings, and consists of a central portion with a projecting cross gable at each end. The windows are casements.	II
Store Room, Pickerings Bridge Cottage; 53.28202°N 2.63780°W	—	c. 1850	A brown-brick building on a blue-brick plinth, with a grey slate roof.	II
Dutton Locks; 53.2876°N 2.6218°W		1874	A pair of sandstone and limestone locks on the Weaver Navigation, wide enough to accommodate 500-ton seagoing ships.	II
Dutton Sluice; 53.2891°N 2.6201°W		c. 1874	A sluice in sandstone and cast iron. There are eight sluice-gates divided by piers, above which is an iron walkway.	II
Horse Bridge; 53.2860°N 2.6251°W		1915	A timber footbridge crossing the River Weaver, with two long segmental arches. It has concrete springers and brick abutments. It is a very early surviving example of a pre-stressed laminated timber structure.	II

== See also ==
- Listed buildings in Acton Bridge
- Listed buildings in Aston-by-Sutton
- Listed buildings in Crowton
- Listed buildings in Daresbury
- Listed buildings in Little Leigh
- Listed buildings in Whitley
