= Listed buildings in Aston-by-Sutton =

Aston-by-Sutton is a civil parish in Cheshire West and Chester, England. It is largely rural, with the West Coast Main Line and the Trent and Mersey Canal passing through its east border, and the River Weaver running to the south. The parish contains 30 buildings that are recorded in the National Heritage List for England as designated listed buildings. Of these, one is listed at Grade I, St Peter's Church, and the others at Grade II. Of the latter, there are a number of tombs and other structures associated with the church. The other listed buildings include houses, a war memorial, buildings associated with the former Aston Old Hall, and structures related to the canal.

== Key ==
Grade	Criteria
Grade I	Buildings of exceptional interest, sometimes considered to be internationally important.
Grade II	Buildings of national importance and special interest.

== Buildings ==
Name and location	Photograph	Date	Notes	Grade
Bankfield Farm; 53.2944°N 2.6514°W	—	Late 16th century	Originally a farmhouse, later divided into two dwellings. Basically a timber-framed building with crucks, later enclosed in brown brick, with slate roofs. It is symmetrical in two storeys, with a central pedimented doorway flanked by single-storey bay windows.	II
Cottage, Aston Lane; 53.2998°N 2.6632°W	—	Late 16th century	A two-storey house consisting of two wings at right angles to each other. The cross-wing dates from the late 16th century, and the other wing from the 17th century. The building is timber-framed on a sandstone plinth with some rebuilding in rendered brick.	II
Gamekeeper's cottage 53.2976°N 2.6724°W	—	Late 16th century	A former wing of Aston Old Hall, later used as a gamekeeper's cottage and store. There is evidence that it is basically a timber-framed building that has been enclosed in brick, which is partly rendered and partly pebbledashed. It is roofed in slate and most of the windows are horizontally sliding sashes.	II
Former font 53.30128°N 2.66797°W	—	Early 17th century (probable)	A former red sandstone font consisting of an octagonal head on a circular shaft. It has a domed top made from two stones.	II
Aston Cross; 53.29980°N 2.66394°W		17th century (probable)	In red sandstone, this has a triangular base of three steps, a plinth, a chamfered shaft, and a square head.	II
John Egerton tomb 53.30114°N 2.66791°W	—	1652	A slightly raised slab with moulded edges and an inscription on the top.	II
Churchyard wall and lychgate 53.3015°N 2.6680°W		Late 17th century (probable)	The churchyard wall to the north and east of the church is in sandstone. The lychgate is dated 1908; it is timber-framed on a sandstone plinth with a red tiled roof.	II
Churchyard wall 53.3008°N 2.6683°W	—	Late 17th century (probable)	The churchyard wall to the south and west of the church is in sandstone.	II
Dovecote; 53.29745°N 2.67191°W	—	1691	Formerly associated with Aston Old Hall, this is a brick dovecote with stone dressings, and a missing roof. Inside are over 800 nesting boxes. It is also a Scheduled monument.	II
St Peter's Church; 53.3012°N 2.6679°W		1695	The chancel dates from 1695, and the nave was built between in 1736 and 1740. The interior of the church was altered during the 19th and early 20th centuries, and the church was repaired in 1949–50 following damage by a land mine in 1940. The building is constructed in Runcorn sandstone, and is in Georgian style.	I
John Okell tomb 53.30114°N 2.66814°W	—	1697	A table tomb standing on six square legs, with the inscription on the slab.	II
John Burke tomb 53.30111°N 2.66794°W	—	1713 (?)	A small table tomb on a plain base, the slab incised with an angel and lettering.	II
Edward and Mary Woodhouse tomb 53.30114°N 2.66786°W	—	1718	A slightly raised tomb slab with the inscription around the border.	II
James Okell tomb 53.30111°N 2.66815°W	—	1748	A table tomb with fluted antae at the corners, a panel at each and two inscribed panels divided by a pilaster on each side.	II
Elizabeth and Samuel Okell tomb 53.30107°N 2.66815°W	—	1758	A table tomb with fluted antae at the corners, a panel at each and two inscribed panels divided by a pilaster on each side.	II
Mary and Robert Okell tomb 53.30112°N 2.66815°W	—	1770	A table tomb with fluted antae at the corners, a panel at each and two panels divided by a pilaster on each side. The inscription is on the slab.	II
Roll Okell tomb 53.30111°N 2.66816°W	—	1775	A table tomb with fluted antae at the corners, a panel at each and two panels divided by a pilaster on each side. The inscription is on the slab.	II
Wall around Aston Gardens; 53.3005°N 2.6666°W	—	Late 18th century (probable)	A brick wall surrounding a former walled garden, including flues. It is in the shape of a parallelogram.	II
Mary Fletcher tomb 53.30110°N 2.66814°W	—	1776	A table tomb with fluted antae at the corners, a panel at each and two panels divided by a pilaster on each side. The inscription is on the slab.	II
South portal, Preston Brook Tunnel; 53.3048°N 2.6405°W		c. 1777	This is at the point where the Trent and Mersey Canal enters the Preston Brook Tunnel from the south. It was designed by James Brindley, and is in brick with sandstone wing walls.	II
Gates, plinths and railings, Top Lodge; 53.2993°N 2.6618°W	—	1790s (probable)	Attributed to Samuel Wyatt, these consist of seven piers and plinths in sandstone, and gates and railings in wrought iron.	II
Top Lodge; 53.2992°N 2.6616°W	—	1790s (doubtful)	Lodge to the former Aston Old Hall, attributed to Samuel Wyatt, but this has been disputed. It is a single-storey building with stuccoed walls on a sandstone plinth with slate roofs. It has tall arched windows, a canted porch, and is decorated with a floral frieze.	II
Well; 53.2974°N 2.6648°W	—	c. 1800 (probable)	This is a sunken barrel vaulted chamber in red sandstone approached by six stone steps.	II
Aston Lodge; 53.2995°N 2.6645°W	—	1824	A symmetrical two-storey brick house with a square plan. It has a slate hipped roof with a flat lead-covered centre. At the front is a cast iron porch and a door flanked by Doric pilasters. The windows are sashes.	II
Sundial; 53.29908°N 2.66491°W	—	c. 1824	A sundial in the garden of Aston Lodge. It consists of a stone vase baluster standing on two steps, with a copper dial and gnomon.	II
Stop lock keeper's cottage 53.3036°N 2.6392°W	—	Early 19th century	Located on the west side of the Trent and Mersey Canal by a stop lock, this is a whitewashed brick cottage with slate roofs. It is in two storeys, and contains casement windows.	II
Coach house 53.2976°N 2.6718°W	—	Early 19th century (probable)	Formerly associated with Aston Old Hall, this is a brick building with three arched coach doorways.	II
Horse trough 53.29748°N 2.67227°W	—	Early 19th century (probable)	Formerly associated with Aston Old Hall, this is a circular structure carved from a single piece of red sandstone.	II
Mary and William Okell tomb 53.30115°N 2.66813°W	—	1837	A table tomb with fluted antae at the corners, a panel at each and two inscribed panels divided by a pilaster on each side.	II
War memorial 53.30139°N 2.66755°W		1920	The war memorial stands on a triangle of grass near to St Peter's Church. It is in sandstone, and consists of a tapering pillar about 2.5 metres (8 ft 2 in) high on a square step. On the top is a pyramidal cap and on the front is a wreath with a ribbon. The pillar contains inscriptions, including the names of those lost in both World Wars. The memorial is in a square enclosure bounded by iron railings.	II

== See also ==
- Listed buildings in Crowton
- Listed buildings in Dutton
- Listed buildings in Frodsham
- Listed buildings in Kingsley
- Listed buildings in Runcorn (rural area)
- Listed buildings in Runcorn (urban area)
- Listed buildings in Sutton
