= Dutton Locks =

Locks in Cheshire, England

Coordinates: 53.2876°N 2.6218°W

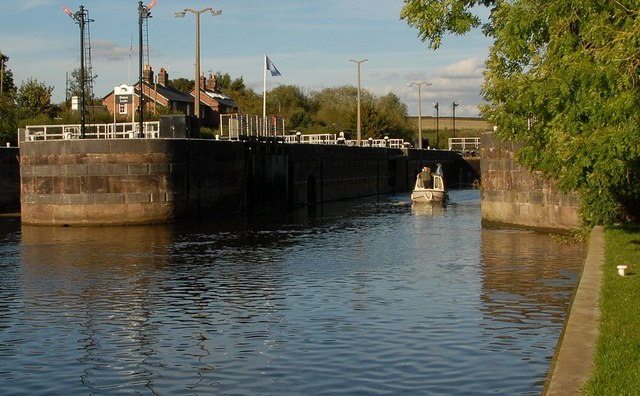
Dutton Locks

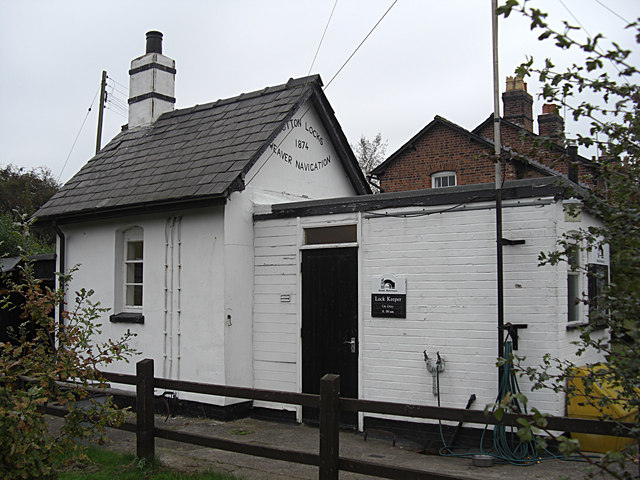
The lock keeper's cottage

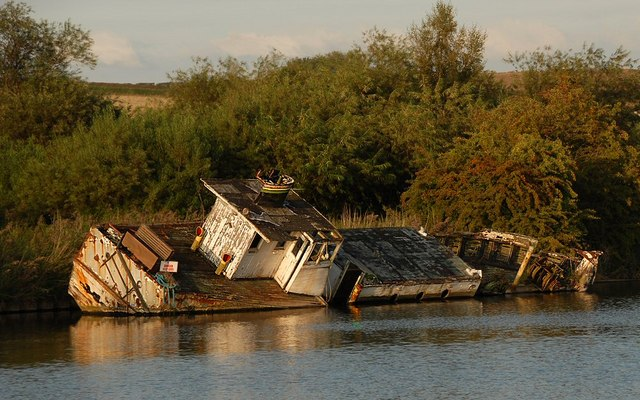
The wreck of the Chica

Dutton Locks is a historic lock on the River Weaver in Cheshire, England. The locks are Grade II listed with Historic England. The locks are still in use and form a destination for walkers and cyclists. Dutton Locks is also the name of a hamlet of approximately six residences adjacent to the locks.

== Description ==
There are two locks built in 1874 for the Weaver Navigation Company. The lock gates are driven by Pelton turbines and semaphores control access to the locks. The locks raise or lower boats by 2.4m (8 feet) and they are 7.3m (24 feet) deep when the locks are full. The largest ship ever to use the lock was the 1,000 tonne capacity St. Michael from the Netherlands, which passed through in 1984.

== Facilities ==
The locks can only be accessed on land via a footpath along the river; consequently they are used as a recreational destination for walkers, horse riders and cyclists. The footpath forms part of the Weaver Way, a 40-mile (64 km) hiking trail between Audlem and Frodsham. It is also on National Cycle Route 5.

The locks are managed by the Canal and River Trust and mooring is allowed with a permit. There is a shipwreck at the locks, of a boat called the Chica, built in 1894. The locks are a short distance from two other Grade II listed landmarks – Dutton Horse Bridge and Dutton Sluice – and the Grade II* listed Dutton Viaduct.

== See also ==
- Listed buildings in Acton Bridge
- List of parks and open spaces in Cheshire
