= Dutton, Cheshire =

Village in Cheshire, England

Coordinates: 53.307739°N 2.63674°W

Dutton
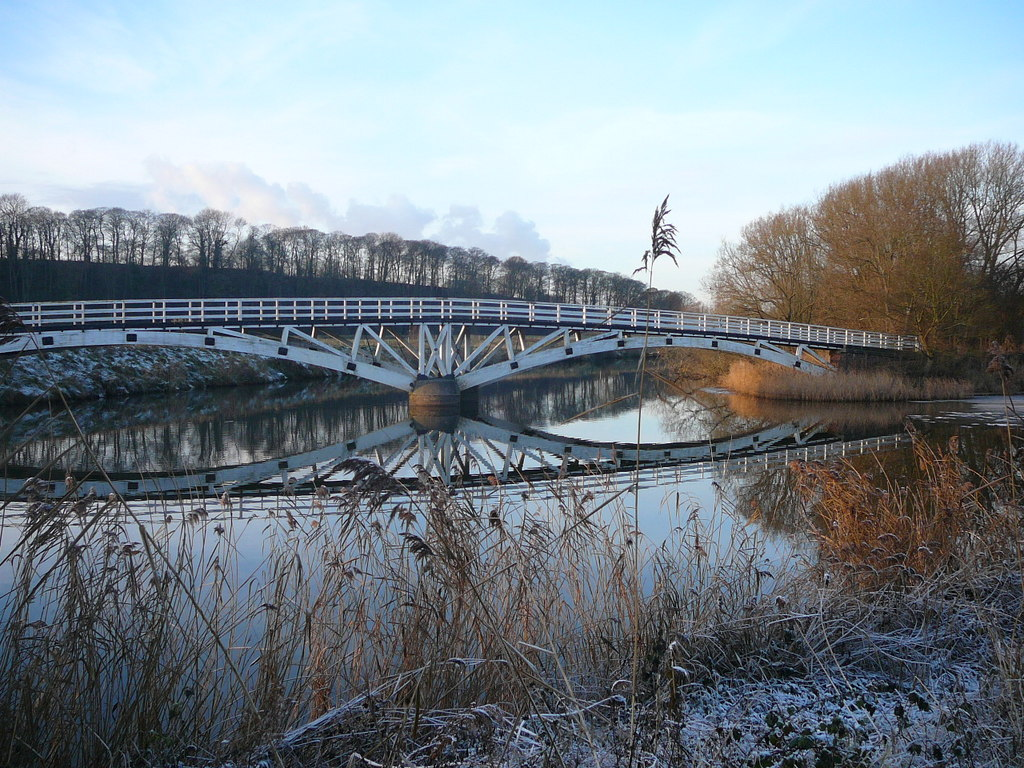
- Dutton horse bridge and River Weaver

- Location within Cheshire
- Population: 424 (2011 census)
- Civil parish: Dutton
- Unitary authority: Cheshire West and Chester
- Ceremonial county: Cheshire
- Region: North West
- Country: England
- Sovereign state: United Kingdom
- Post town: Warrington
- Postcode district: WA4
- Dialling code: 01928
- Police: Cheshire
- Fire: Cheshire
- Ambulance: North West
- UK Parliament: Tatton

Dutton is a civil parish and village within the unitary authority of Cheshire West and Chester, in the ceremonial county of Cheshire, England, about two miles (3 km) east of Runcorn. Dutton is on the River Weaver and was home to Dutton Hall, built in 1513 and moved to Sussex in the 1930s. Dutton Viaduct, a viaduct of 20 arches, each 63 feet in span, and 60 feet high, carries the Grand Junction railway over Dutton Bottom, across the valley of the Weaver.

It had a population of 424 according to the 2011 census.

== Industry ==
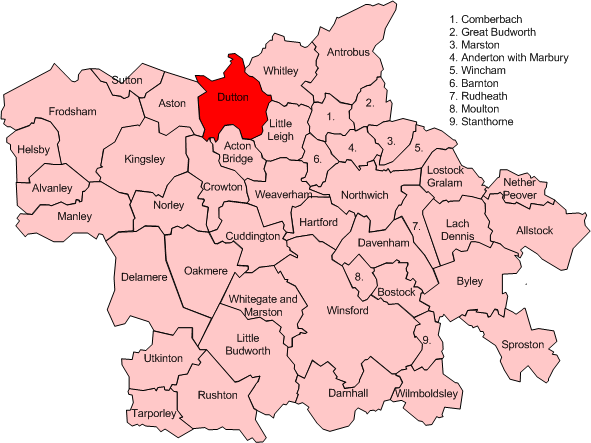
Map of civil parish of Dutton within the former borough of Vale Royal

The 1881 census shows the dominant occupation of Dutton's population as "agriculture", in which category a total of 61 males and 3 females were employed. For males, "workers in general or unspecified commodities" was the second-most popular occupation, with a total of 16 males. The majority of women in 1881 had no specified occupation. The main occupations for males in Dutton at the present time, according to the 2011 census key statistics data, are "Skilled Trade Occupations", with a total of 22.7% of the economically active males, and "Managers, Directors and Senior Officials", with a total of 20% of males. The main two occupations for women in Dutton are "Professional Occupations", with a total of 23.8%, and "Managers, Directors and Senior Officials", with 20% of females in Dutton in this category.

== History ==
It was known at Domesday as Duntune, and belonged to the ancient family of Dutton, who had jurisdiction over the minstrels and pipers of the county. Dutton Hall was built in 1513 by the Duttons; described as "exhibit[ing] fine features of the architecture of its period", it was dismantled in the 1930s and moved to Ashurst Wood, West Sussex, where it was rebuilt and later became Stoke Brunswick School.

In 1887, Dutton was described as:

"Dutton.-- township, Great Budworth par., mid. Cheshire, on river Weaver, 5½ miles NW. of Northwich, 2090 ac. (36 water), pop. 452."

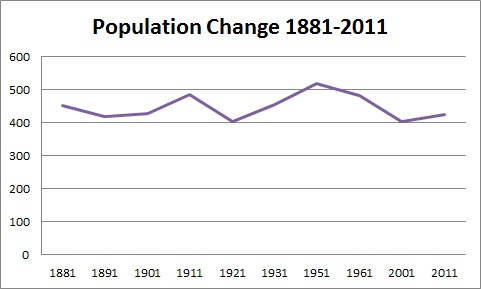
Dutton population change 1881–2011

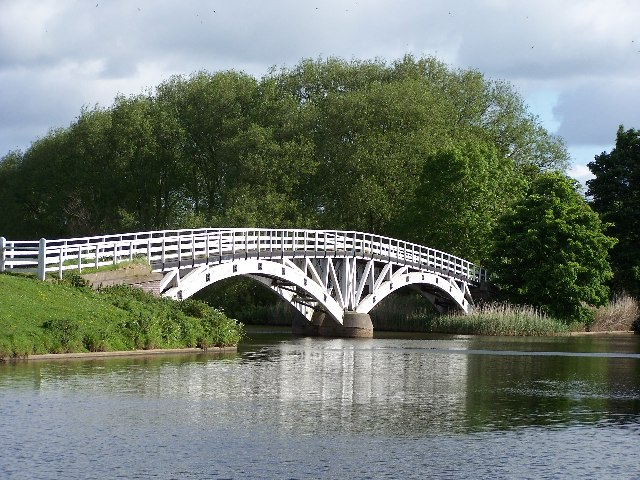
Dutton horse bridge

== Demography ==
The overall population of Dutton has been fluctuating from 1881 to 2011, with an overall net loss in population. According to the 1881 census data, there were 452 people living in Dutton, whereas the population in 2011 was 424. This shows a loss of 28 people over the 130-year period recorded. The population density of Dutton is 0.4 people per hectare according to the 2011 census data. This is significantly less than the average population density of England, which is 5.0 persons per hectare.

== Housing and transport ==
The dominant housing in Dutton is detached housing with a total of 80 out of the 180 households in Dutton being detached. There are also 41 semi-detached houses in the Dutton parish. There is also a large amount of caravans or other mobile or temporary structures in Dutton, with 45 of these in total. There are a total of 315 cars or vans registered in Dutton according to the 2011 census data. The majority of households, 71 out of 180, have one car or van, whereas 69 have 2 vehicles. Nine households have no car or van.

== See also ==
- Listed buildings in Dutton, Cheshire
- Aston-by-Sutton
- Preston Brook
- Whitley
- Little Leigh
- Acton Bridge
