= Acton Swing Bridge =

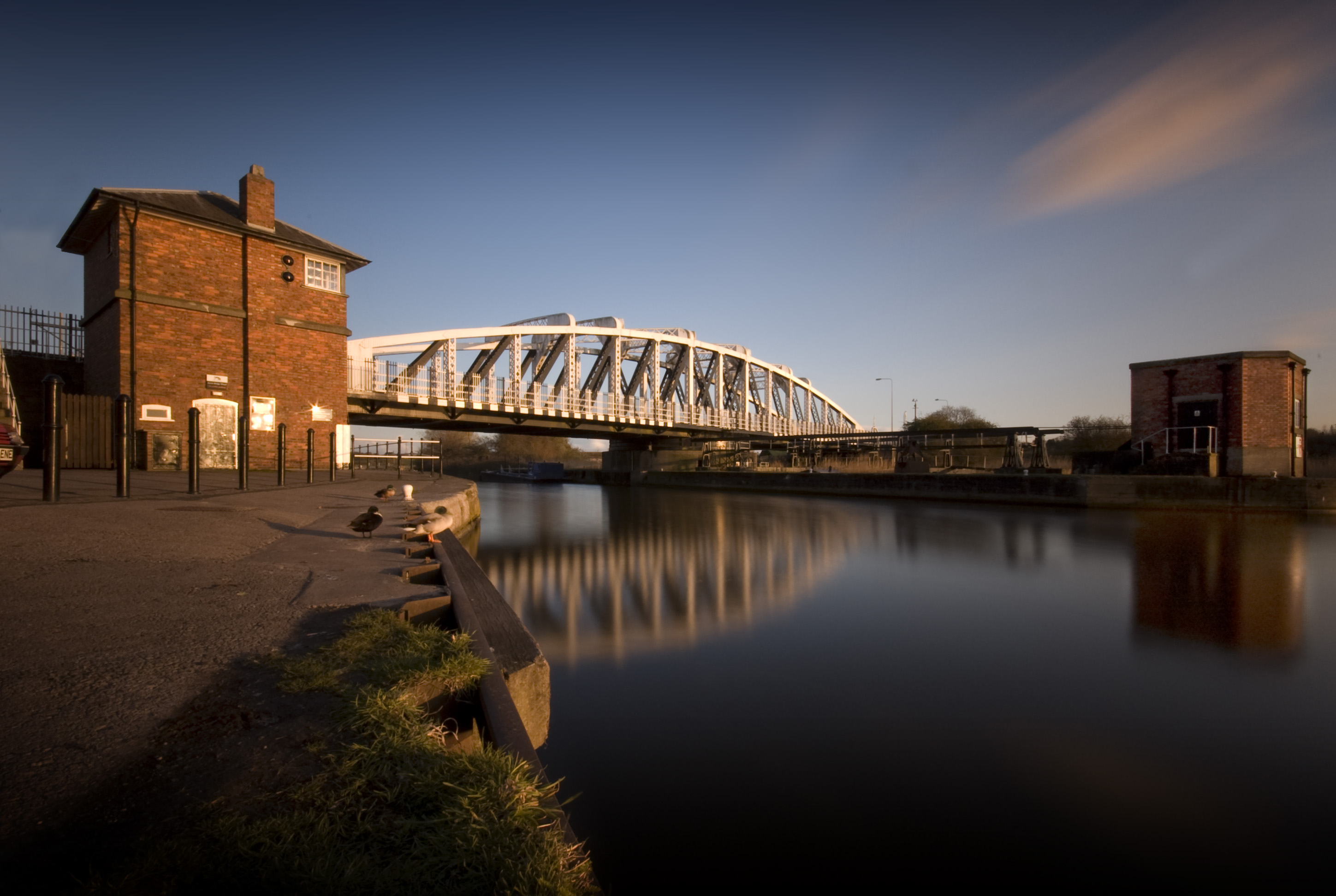
- Coordinates: 53.279882°N 2.600702°W
- Carries: Road traffic
- Crosses: River Weaver
- Locale: Cheshire, England

Characteristics
- Design: Swing truss bridge
- Material: Steel
- Total length: 83.5 metres (274 ft)

History
- Constructed by: John Arthur Saner (design)
- Opened: 10 August 1933

Location
- Interactive map of Acton Swing Bridge

Acton Swing Bridge is a swing bridge spanning the River Weaver in the village of Acton Bridge in north Cheshire, England. First operated in 1933, it carries the A49 trunk road.

== History ==
The bridge is 83.5 m long and 8 m high bowstring truss balanced swing bridge, based on an 1893 design by John Arthur Saner. It has two slightly skew spans of 25 m each, with the twin riveted steel trusses supported on a mass concrete pontoon chamber.

Public Works Facilities Scheme (Acton Swing Bridge) Confirmation Act 1931
- Act of Parliament
- Parliament of the United Kingdom
- Long title: An Act to confirm a Scheme made by the Minister of Transport under the Public Works Facilities Act 1930 relating to the Weaver Navigation Trustees and the Cheshire County Council.
- Citation: 21 & 22 Geo. 5. c. xxiii

Dates
- Royal assent: 11 June 1931
Other legislation
Relates to	Public Works Facilities Act 1930

Text of statute as originally enacted

It was built in an open position between 1931 and 1933 at a cost of £52,000, shutting for the first time on 10 August 1933. The current bridge replaced an older stone bridge which had been able to carry only one line of traffic with an axle weight limit of 8 tons (the first bridge across the Weaver at this point was built in 1751). The current bridge is approximately 100 m north (downstream) of the old bridge's abutments, visible on the river banks from the Leigh Arms car park.

It has been subject to periodic strengthening (e.g. in 1987) and repair (e.g. in 2015). Today the structure of the bridge is maintained by the Canal & River Trust; Cheshire West and Chester Council is responsible for maintaining the A49 road which it carries.

== See also ==
- Dutton Horse Bridge, a nearby bridge also by Saner
