= Listed buildings in Crowton =

Crowton is a civil parish in Cheshire West and Chester, England. Apart from the village of Crowton, the parish is entirely rural. It contains ten buildings that are recorded in the National Heritage List for England as designated listed buildings. These are all listed at Grade II, the lowest of the three grades, which contains "buildings of national importance and special interest".

== Buildings ==
Name and location	Photograph	Date	Notes
Sandhole Farmhouse; 53.2524°N 2.6332°W	—	1672	A timber-framed house on a stone plinth, with a thatched roof covered in corrugated iron. It has a three-bay main section in two storeys, and a single-story one-bay wing. The windows are casements.
Stonehouses; 53.2655°N 2.6374°W		1686	Built as a farmhouse, this has been divided into three dwellings. It is constructed in large blocks of Manley sandstone and has slate roofs. It is in an H-shaped plan and has two storeys. Other than one casement window, all the windows are mullioned.
Birchtree Farmhouse; 53.2619°N 2.6132°W	—	Late 18th century	The house is in red brick, with a cement tiled roof, and brick chimneys on the gables. It has an L-shaped plan and is in two storeys. The south front is in three bays, the central bay having a doorway with a semicircular head and a fanlight.
Pear Tree Farmhouse; 53.2743°N 2.6355°W		1798	A two-storey brick house with a slate roof. It has a nearly-symmetrical three-bay front, and contains sash windows.
Hollies Farmhouse; 53.2615°N 2.6136°W	—	Early 19th century	A two-storey house in brick on a stone plinth with stone dressings and a slate roof. It has a symmetrical three-bay north front. The central bay has a pedimented doorcase, and the windows are sashes.
Onston Hall; 53.2626°N 2.6150°W	—	Early 19th century	A two-storey house in brick on a stone plinth with sandstone dressings and a slate roof. It has a symmetrical three-bay front. Other than a bay window and a dormer, most of the windows are sashes.
Shippon and barn Crewood Hall; 53.2809°N 2.6516°W	—	Early 19th century (probable)	This is a long brick building in two storeys with a slate roof. It incorporates archways, doors, hopper windows and, in the upper storey, loading doors, pitching holes, and vents in diamond and split-diamond patterns.
Christ Church; 53.2664°N 2.6312°W		1871	Designed by J. L. Pearson, the church is constructed in red sandstone with a red tile roof. Its architectural style is that of the 13th century, with a two-tier double bellcote at the west end.
Ruloe House; 53.2512°N 2.6263°W	—	1873	Built as an agent's house for the Wilbraham estate and designed by John Douglas, it is constructed in brick with tiled roofs in a broadly Tudor style. At the right end is a turret with a steep conical roof. Other than one dormer, the windows are either mullioned in brick, or mullioned and transomed.
War Memorial; 53.26636°N 2.63369°W		1921	The war memorial is in stone and stands on a four-stage square plinth on a square base. It has a square tapering shaft carrying a Celtic wheel-head cross with ornamentation on its front. On the front of the shaft is an inscription commemorating those who died in both World Wars. Around the base are four small square pillars and iron rails.

== See also ==
- Listed buildings in Aston-by-Sutton
- Listed buildings in Acton Bridge
- Listed buildings in Cuddington
- Listed buildings in Dutton
- Listed buildings in Kingsley
- Listed buildings in Norley
- Listed buildings in Weaverham
