= Ruloe House =

- Location within Cheshire

General information
- Location: Crowton, Cheshire, England
- Coordinates: 53.2512°N 2.6263°W
- Completed: c.1873

Design and construction
- Architect: John Douglas

Listed Building – Grade II
- Official name: Ruloe House
- Designated: 17 April 1986
- Reference no.: 1139195

Ruloe House is a country house 1.75 miles (2.8 km) east of Norley, Cheshire, England. It was built in about 1873 for the Wilbraham estate, and designed by the Chester architect John Douglas. It is constructed in red brick and has red tiled roofs. The house is decorated with strip pilasters. It is in two storeys, with a four-bay south front. On its garden side is a circular turret with a conical roof. The house is recorded in the National Heritage List for England as a designated Grade II listed building.

== See also ==
- Listed buildings in Crowton
- List of houses and associated buildings by John Douglas
