= A49 road =

Road in England

A49

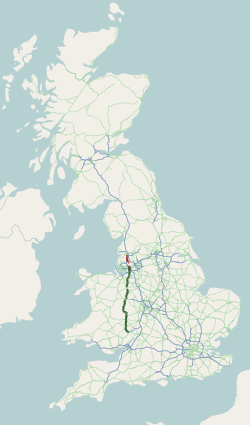

Route information
- Length: 146.5 mi (235.8 km)

Major junctions
- South end: A40 at Ross-on-Wye
- A5 near Shrewsbury M56 near Stretton M62 near Winwick M6 / A580 near Newton-le-Willows
- North end: A6 near Bamber Bridge

Location
- Country: United Kingdom
- Counties: Herefordshire, Shropshire, Cheshire, Merseyside, Greater Manchester, Lancashire
- Primary destinations: Hereford; Leominster; Shrewsbury; Whitchurch; Warrington; Wigan

Road network
- Roads in the United Kingdom; Motorways; A and B road zones

The A49 is an A road in western England, which traverses the Welsh Marches region. It runs north from Ross-on-Wye in Herefordshire via Hereford, Leominster, Ludlow, Shrewsbury and Whitchurch, then continues through central Cheshire to Warrington and Wigan before terminating at its junction with the A6 road just south of Bamber Bridge, near the junction of the M6, M65 and M61 motorways.

As is hinted at by the way the place name of Stretton recurs along its route, its central part follows Iter XII of the Roman Antonine Itinerary.

The stretch between Ross-on-Wye and the A5 at Shrewsbury is a trunk road, maintained by National Highways.

== Route ==
=== Lancashire ===
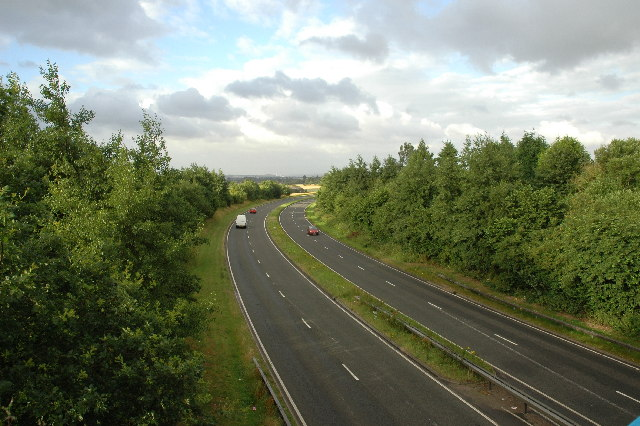
The A49 spur to the M6 near Warrington and Winwick.

From the A6 at Bamber Bridge, south of Preston, the road runs parallel to the M6 motorway, through Leyland towards Wigan. Through Ashton-in-Makerfield and Newton-le-Willows, reaching Warrington via Winwick. In June 2020, a new section of the A49 opened forming part of a link between Wigan town centre and junction 25 on the M6, the section it replaced being renumbered B5386.

=== Cheshire ===
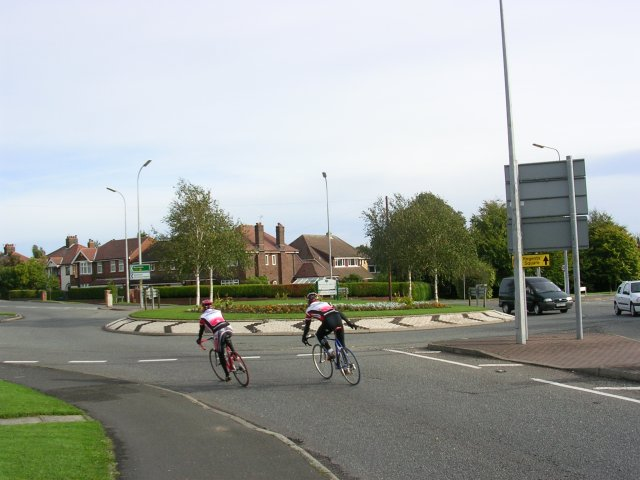
Owens Corner south of Warrington

From junction 9 of the M62, there is a dual-carriageway through Warrington, as far as Loushers Lane (With the exception of a brief stretch northbound after meeting the A57 and another northbound before meeting the A5060 which has one lane reserved for buses during peak hours.). During this section, it passes under the Liverpool to Manchester Line railway (southern route), then has the Cockhedge Green roundabout with the A57 and passes to the east and south of the town centre of Warrington. (Its original north–south route through the town centre is now partly pedestrianised.)

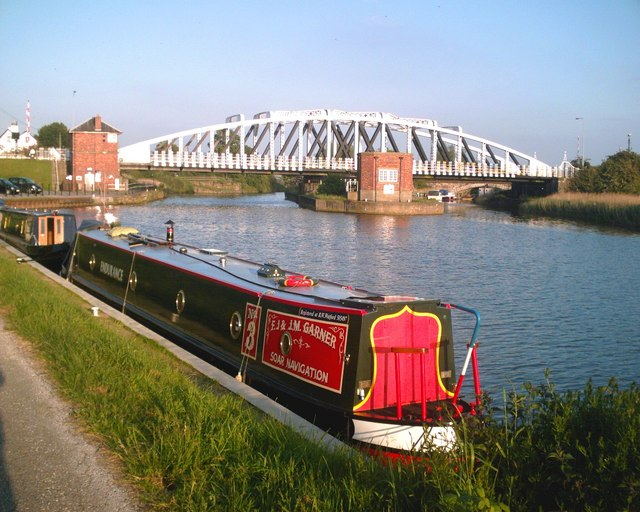
Acton Swing Bridge

It passes over a roundabout with the A5061 situated on the River Mersey, then goes past Priestley College. It passes over the Manchester Ship Canal, Cheshire Ring Canal Walk and Bridgewater Canal. At Pewterspear there is the Owens Corner roundabout. The road has crossroads with the B5356 at Stretton and meets the A559 at junction 10 of the M56. The road enters Cheshire West And Chester. There is crossroads with the A533 and the road crosses the Cheshire Ring Canal Walk and Trent & Mersey Canal before crossing the Acton swing bridge over the Weaver Navigation.

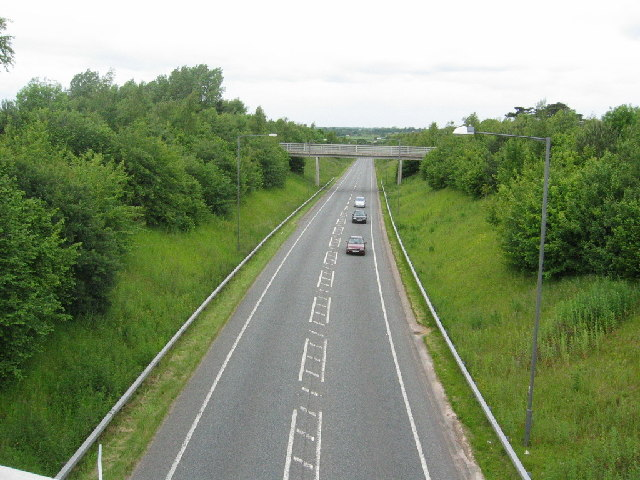
Weaverham Diversion

The 3-mile (4.8 km) £6 million Weaverham Diversion (near Northwich) opened in September 1992. The old route is now the B5144, passing near Weaverham High School. The road passes over the West Coast Main Line railway after the Weaverham Roundabout. The section from Weaverham to Cuddington is a new much-straightened section. At Bryn, north of Cuddington, it passes the former site of Lactalis-Nestlé that made Ski and Munch Bunch yoghurts, closing in 2007 with production moving to central Europe, having made yoghurt since 1968. In Cuddington it crosses the Mid-Cheshire Line near Cuddington railway station. There is the Oakmere Crossroads with the A556 (a Roman road) south of Cuddington, before the road crosses the Whitegate Way. It then crosses the A54 near Abbots Moss Hall, and the road passes through Cotebrook, near Little Budworth Country Park.

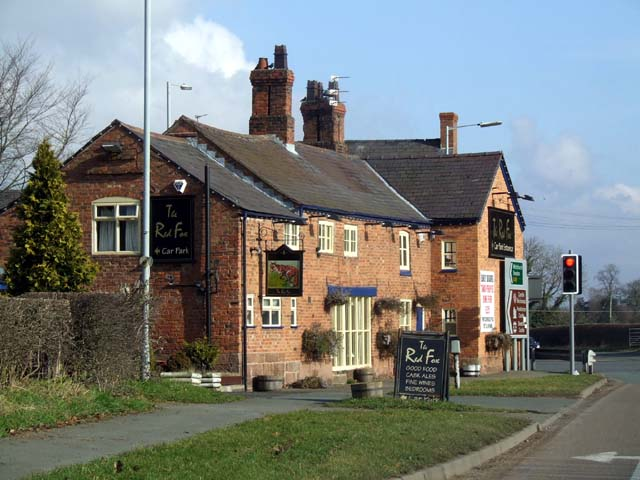
The Red Fox

The 2-mile (3.2 km) £3.8 million Tarporley Bypass opened in September 1986. The A51 overlaps the A49. Tarporley Community High School is near here. The road leaves the A51 to the west at Four Lane Ends near the Red Fox. The road travels over the Shropshire Union Canal and under the Welsh Marches Line railway (to Hereford) south of Tiverton. It crosses over the River Gowy north of Bunbury next to the Beeston Castle (named after the real Beeston Castle to the west).

The road briefly overlaps the A534 Wrexham Road from the junction at Ridley and crosses over the River Weaver. At Cholmondeley there is Cholmondeley Castle. At the crossroads of Bickerton Road (for the castle) and Wrenbury Road, there is the Cholmondeley Arms. Moving from the parishes of Cholmondeley to Bickley east of Moss Wood, it also moves back into Cheshire West and Chester. It crosses the Shropshire Union Canal (Llangollen Canal) again at Tushingham cum Grindley, where it crosses into Marbury cum Quoisley and back into Cheshire East. The road enters into Shropshire and is crossed by the South Cheshire Way near Hinton.

=== Shropshire ===
The Whitchurch bypass begins with a roundabout with the B5476, the old route through the town. The 3-mile (4.8 km) £13.7m Whitchurch Bypass (also part of the A41) opened in July 1992. It passes near Sir John Talbot's Technology College (on the A525), then crosses over the railway and also overlaps the A525 (Newcastle-under-Lyme to Rhyl). At the end of the bypass, the road overlaps as a dual-carriageway for 2 1/2 miles (4.0 km) with the A41, then leaves the A41 at a roundabout near Prees Heath, near the former RAF Tilstock airfield. It follows a Roman road southwards.

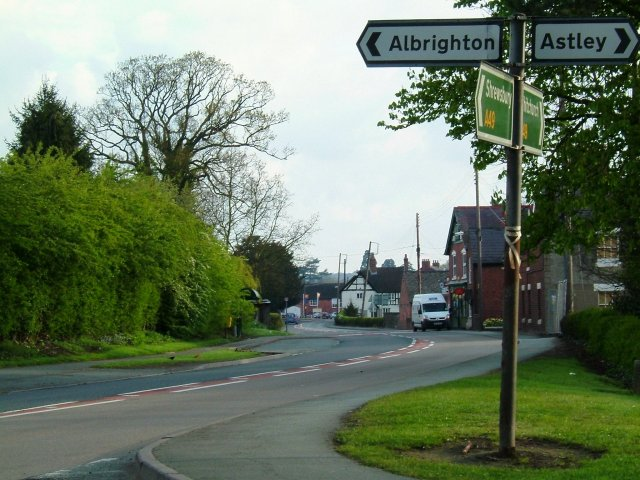
Hadnall

The 2-mile (3.2 km) £1.3m Prees Bypass opened in August 1988. There is a staggered crossroads with the B5065, then the road passes over the River Roden. RAF Shawbury is 1 1/2 miles (2.4 km) to the east, then the road passes over the Shropshire Way and through Hadnall, passing the New Inn. The Welsh Marches Line follows to the west. The Shrewsbury bypass starts at the Battlefield Roundabout (near scene of Battle of Shrewsbury) with the A53 and A5124, near a Travelodge. There is a roundabout with the B5062. The bypass travels over the River Severn and under the railway and overlaps the A5 from the Preston Island roundabout. Shrewsbury was bypassed when the £64m east-west A5 bypass was built in August 1992.

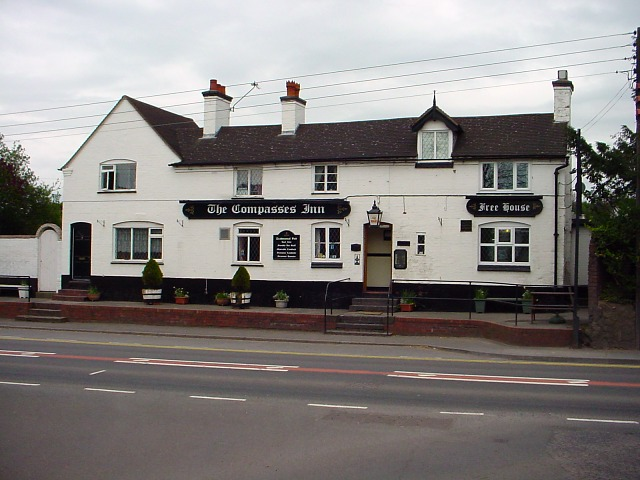
The Compasses Inn

The route leaves the A5 at the Bayston Hill Roundabout on the south of the bypass, with the A5112 heading into Shrewsbury. It goes through Bayston Hill, passing the Compasses Inn. It passes near Lyth Hill Country Park, following the Welsh Marches Line (until Woofferton). It crosses the Cound Brook near the Bridge Innbefore passing through Dorrington, with The Horseshoes and over the railway. Through Leebotwood it passes The Pound.

The road passes through the Stretton Gap on an alignment that was constructed in the late 1930s. Several stretches of the road follow the route of one of the Roman Roads later called Watling Street. The upgraded route bypasses All Stretton, Church Stretton and Little Stretton. The original route is the B5477 (former B4370) to the west. At a crossroads near Church Stretton railway station, the road meets the B4371. Further south it meets the B4370 (west) at Marshbrook. At Upper Affcot it passes the White House. The road meets the A489 at Wistanstow. At Craven Arms, there is the Shropshire Hills Discovery Centre, and it meets the east-west B4368. At Onibury, there is a level crossing, one of only a few on trunk roads in England. The section from Shrewsbury to Ludlow is prone to crashes.

At Bromfield, the road meets the A4113, and crosses the River Onny. Near the B4365 junction the road is crossed by the Shropshire Way. The 3-mile (4.8 km) £4m Ludlow Bypass opened in the summer of 1979. The bypass passes over then under the railway, then over the River Teme. The former route of the A49 is the B4361. After the bypass, the road passes over the railway. At Woofferton, there is a T-junction with the A456, and a staggered junction with the B4362. Woofferton has a large radio transmitting station (the Woofferton transmitting station) with a Mediumwave transmitter for BBC Hereford and Worcester.

=== Herefordshire ===
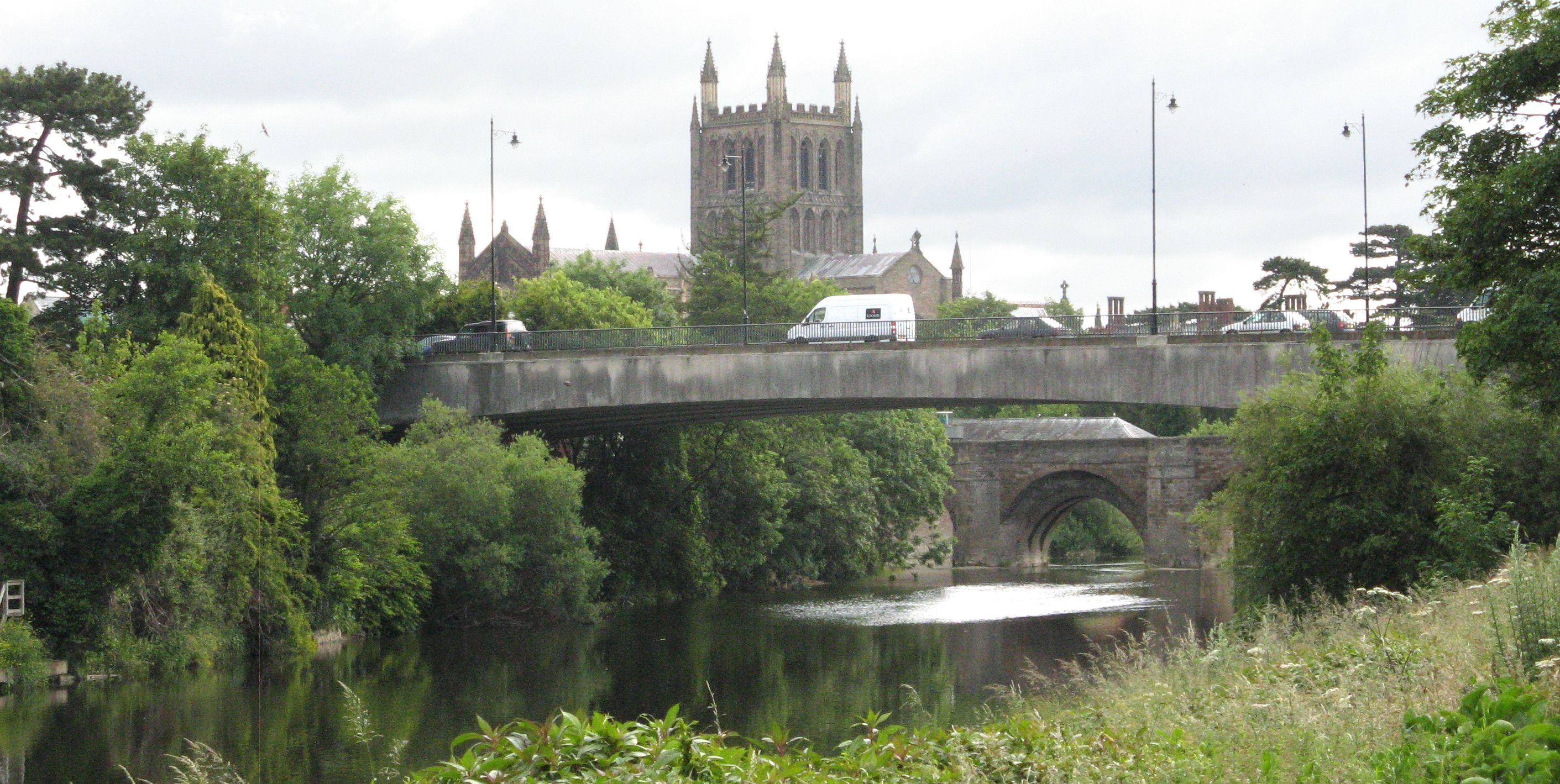
Greyfriars bridge over the River Wye in Hereford.

The road enters Herefordshire. The 1-mile (1.6 km) £1.4 million Brimfield Bypass opened in March 1983. South of Ashton the road passes through the Capability Brown parkland of Berrington Hall. The 4-mile (6.4 km) £9m Leominster Bypass opened in November 1988. At the southern end of the Leominster Bypass the A49 passes the Cadbury's Marlbrook chocolate factory. Shortly after, the A417 route to Gloucester begins at a junction shortly before the A49 makes its way up Dinmore Hill past Queen's Wood Country Park. The south bound carriageway is 2-lane up the hill and the north bound carriageway is 2-lane heading up the other side of the hill. This can be a common section for accidents and skid-offs.

The road then swings towards Wellington with a short section of dual-carriageway. The A49 then reaches Hereford, the only major destination on the road without a bypass. The road passes right through the city centre, causing serious congestion on both the north and south sides of the River Wye. The dual-carriageway Greyfriars bridge over the Wye opened in 1967. The A49 meets the A438 at the Edgar Street Roundabout. The road then swings south-eastwards out of Hereford, meeting the A465 at the Belmont Roundabout. At Ross-on-Wye the road ends, joining the A40 and B4260 at the Wilton Roundabout.

== History of the road number ==
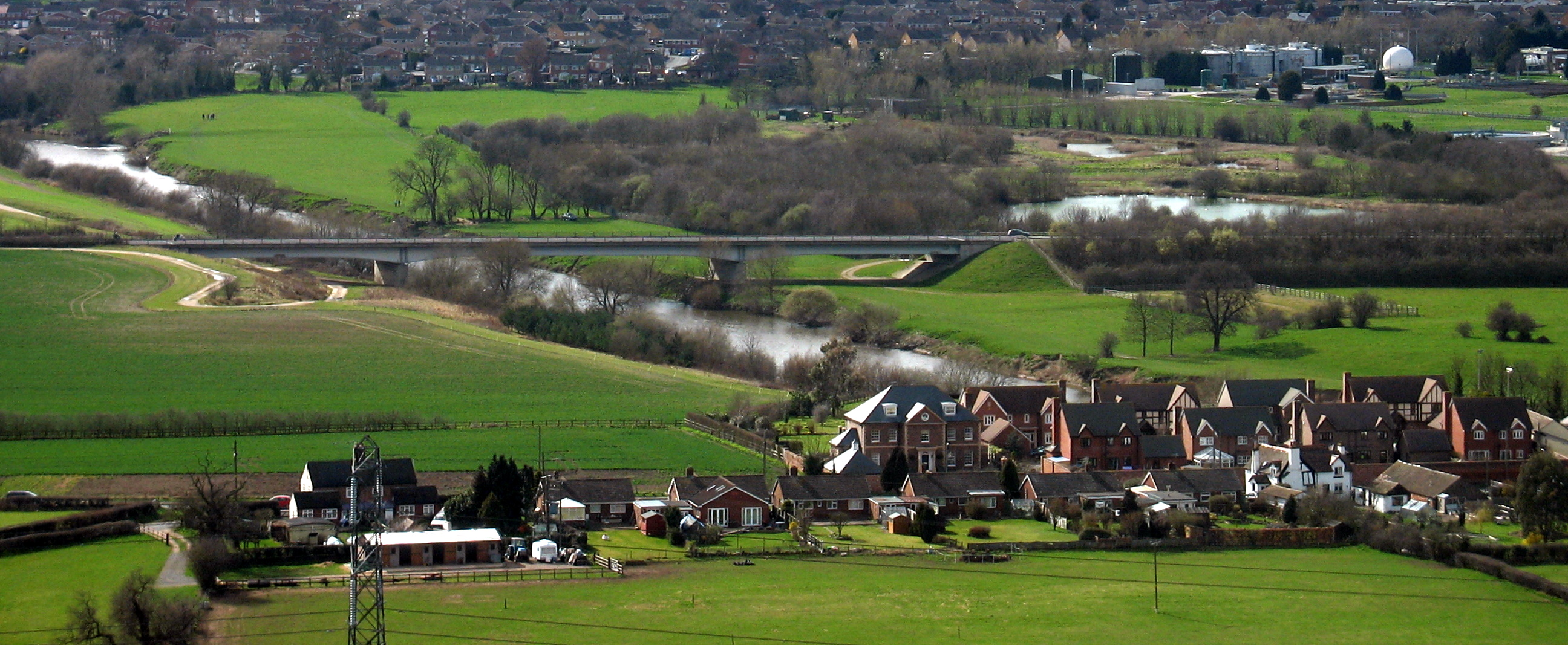
The A49 bridges the River Severn outside Shrewsbury, Shropshire, forming part of the town's bypass with the A5. The village of Uffington is located in the foreground.

The original (1923) route of the A49 was Ross-on-Wye to Bamber Bridge (near Preston), but there have been some changes in its course. The A49 used to start on the A40 at Old Pike, west of Ross, as the original route of the A40 was through Skenfrith. When the A40 was rerouted via Monmouth in 1935, the A49 was extended to Ross.

At a later date, the A49 was rerouted between Shrewsbury and Whitchurch. The 1923 route was via Wem, but the road now passes close to Prees. Much of the current route was originally the B5064.

== Junction list ==
County	Location	mi	km	Destinations	Notes
Herefordshire	Bridstow	0.0	0.0	A40 / B4260 (Wilton Road) to M50 / M5 – The Midlands, South Wales, Gloucester, Monmouth, Ross-on-Wye, Wilton	Southern terminus
Herefordshire	Hentland	3.5	5.6	A4137 south – Monmouth	Northern terminus of A4137
Herefordshire	Much Dewchurch	8.4	13.5	A466 south – Monmouth, Wormelow	Information signed southbound only; northern terminus of A466
Herefordshire	Hereford	12.9	20.8	A465 west (Belmont Road) – Abergavenny	Southern terminus of A465 concurrency
Herefordshire	Hereford	13.5	21.7	A438 west (Eign Street) to A4110 – Brecon, Kington	Southern terminus of A438 concurrency
Herefordshire	Hereford	13.6	21.9	A438 east (Newmarket Street) – Tewkesbury, Ledbury	Northern terminus of A438 concurrency
Herefordshire	Hereford	13.9	22.4	City Link Road (A465 east)	Northern terminus of A465 concurrency
Herefordshire	Hereford– Holmer and Shelwick boundary	14.9	24.0	A4103 (Roman Road) – Stretton Sugwas, Worcester	
Herefordshire	Hope under Dinmore	22.2	35.7	A417 southeast – Gloucester, Bodenham	Northwestern terminus of A417
Herefordshire	Leominster	25.6	41.2	A44 east (Worcester Road) – Worcester, Bromyard	Southern terminus of A44 concurrency
Herefordshire	Kimbolton	26.4	42.5	A44 west (Mill Street) to B4361 – Rhayader, Leominster, Richard's Castle	To B4361 and Richard's Castle signed northbound only; northern terminus of A44 concurrency
Herefordshire	Kimbolton	27.5	44.3	A4112 northeast (New Road) – Laysters, Kimbolton	Southwestern terminus of A4112
Shropshire	Woofferton	32.7	52.6	A456 east / Wyson Lane – Kidderminster, Tenbury, Wyson	Western terminus of A456
Shropshire	Ludlow– Ludford boundary	37.4	60.2	A4117 east (Rocks Green) / Henley Road to B4364 – Kidderminster, Bridgnorth, Ludlow, Cleehill, Cleobury Mortimer, Bewdley	Western terminus of A4117
Shropshire	Bromfield	40.4	65.0	A4113 west – Knighton, Leintwardine	Eastern terminus of A4113
Shropshire	Wistanstow	46.6	75.0	A489 west / Grove Drive to A488 / A490 – Newtown, Bishop's Castle, Welshpool	Eastern terminus of A489
Shropshire	Bayston Hill	63.5	102.2	A5 northwest / A458 west / A5112 north (Hereford Road) – North Wales, Oswestry, Welshpool, Shrewsbury, Llangollen	Southern terminus of A5 / A458 concurrency
Shropshire	Atcham	65.0	104.6	A458 east – Shrewsbury, Bridgnorth	Junction; northbound exit and southbound entrance; northern terminus of A458 concurrency
Shropshire	Atcham– Shrewsbury boundary	65.7	105.7	A5064 northwest (London Road) / B4380 (Thieves Lane / Emstrey Bank) to A458 – Shrewsbury, Bridgnorth, Much Wenlock, Ironbridge, Cross Houses, Atcham, Wroxeter	Southeastern terminus of A5064
Shropshire	Upton Magna	66.8	107.5	A5 southeast to M54 / M6 – Telford, Birmingham	Northern terminus of A5 concurrency
Shropshire	Shrewsbury	69.7	112.2	A53 northeast / A5112 south (Battlefield Road) / A5124 west (Battlefield Link Road) to A528 – Newcastle, Shrewsbury, Ellesmere, Shawbury, Market Drayton	Southeastern terminus of A53; northern terminus of A5112; eastern terminus of A5124
Shropshire	Whitchurch	84.0	135.2	A41 southeast to A442 – Wolverhampton, Telford	To A442 and Telford signed southbound only; southern terminus of A41 concurrency
Shropshire	Whitchurch	85.6	137.8	A525 north (Whitchurch Bypass) / B5476 (Tilstock Road) to A530 – Newcastle, Nantwich, Whitchurch, Wem	Southern terminus of A525 concurrency
Shropshire	Whitchurch	87.1	140.2	A525 south / B5364 (Wrexham Road) to A495 – Wrexham, Oswestry, Whitchurch, Ellesmere	Northern terminus of A525 concurrency
Shropshire	Whitchurch	87.9	141.5	A41 northwest / B5395 (Chester Road) – Chester, Malpas, Whitchurch	Northern terminus of A41 concurrency
Cheshire	Ridley	96.0	154.5	A534 east (Wrexham Road) to A532 – Nantwich, Crewe	To A532 signed southbound only; southern terminus of A534 concurrency
Cheshire	Ridley	96.2– 96.3	154.8– 155.0	A534 west (Wrexham Road) – Wrexham, Bulkeley, Malpas	Northern terminus of A534 concurrency
Cheshire	Tarporley– Tiverton and Tilstone Fearnall boundary	100.7	162.1	A51 southeast (Nantwich Road) / Eaton Lane to M6 / A532 – Nantwich, Birmingham, Eaton, Crewe	To A532 and Crewe signed southbound only; southern terminus of A51 concurrency
Cheshire	Tarporley	102.2	164.5	A51 northwest / Rode Street – Chester, Tarvin	Tarvin signed northbound only; northern terminus of A51 concurrency
Cheshire	Delamere and Oakmere– Little Budworth boundary	105.4	169.6	A54 (Chester Road / Middlewich Road) to A51 – Chester, Winsford, Congleton, Kelsall	
Cheshire	Delamere and Oakmere– Cuddington boundary	107.6	173.2	A556 (Chester Road) to M6 / M56 / A51 / A559 – North Wales, Chester, Manchester, Northwich	To A559 signed southbound only
Cheshire	Little Leigh– Acton Bridge boundary	111.5– 111.6	179.4– 179.6	Acton swing bridge over River Weaver	
Cheshire	Dutton	112.5	181.1	A533 (Runcorn Road / Northwich Road) to A562 – Runcorn, Dutton, Liverpool, Northwich, Barnton	To A562 and Liverpool signed northbound only
Cheshire	Stretton	115.8	186.4	M56 to M6 – Chester, Birmingham, North Wales, Runcorn A559 south (Northwich Road) – Northwich	North Wales and Runcorn signed southbound only; northern terminus of A559; M56 junction 10
Cheshire	Stockton Heath	118.4	190.5	A56 (Walton Road / Grappenhall Road) to A533 – Walton, Lymm, Runcorn	To A533 and Runcorn signed southbound only
Cheshire	Warrington	119.4	192.2	Chester Road (A5060 south) – Walton	Northern terminus of A5060
Cheshire	Warrington	119.6	192.5	A5061 (Wilson Patten Street / Knutsford Road) to M6 / A537 / A562 – Liverpool, Widnes, Macclesfield, Birmingham	Only A5061, Liverpool and Macclesfield signed southbound
Cheshire	Warrington	120.1	193.3	A57 (Midland Way / Manchester Road) to M6 / M62 – Liverpool, Irlam, Birmingham, Woolston	
Cheshire	Warrington	121.4	195.4	Long Lane (A50 southeast) / Hawley's Lane – Birchwood, Orford, Dallam	Northwestern terminus of A50
Cheshire	Warrington	121.9	196.2	A574 south (Cromwell Avenue) to Sandy Lane West / A562 – Widnes, Westbrook, Orford	Northern terminus of A574
Cheshire	Winwick	122.4	197.0	M62 – Liverpool, Manchester, Birmingham	M62 junction 9
Cheshire	Winwick	122.8	197.6	Winwick Link Road to M6 / A572 – Preston, Wigan, Leigh, Birmingham	Wigan signed northbound only, To A572 and Birmingham southbound only
Cheshire	Winwick	123.0	197.9	A573 north (Golborne Road) – Golborne	Southern terminus of A573
Merseyside	Newton-le-Willows	124.8	200.8	A572 east (Southworth Road) – Leigh	Southern terminus of A572 concurrency
Merseyside	Newton-le-Willows	125.3	201.7	A572 west (Crow Lane East) – St. Helens, Earlestown	Northern terminus of A572 concurrency
Merseyside	Newton-le-Willows	126.4	203.4	M6 to M62 – Birmingham, Warrington, Preston, Wigan A580 (East Lancashire Road) to A58 / A570 / A579 – Liverpool, Manchester, St. Helens, Southport, Leigh	To A58, A570, St. Helens and Southport signed northbound only; To A579 and Leigh southbound only; M6 junction 23
Merseyside	Newton-le-Willows	126.8	204.1	A599 west (Penny Lane) – Haydock	Eastern terminus of A599
Greater Manchester	Ashton-in-Makerfield	127.6	205.4	A58 (Liverpool Road / Gerard Street) to M6 north / A580 – St. Helens, Preston, Liverpool, Bolton	Preston signed northbound only
Greater Manchester	Ashton-in-Makerfield	127.8	205.7	Wigan Road (A5062 east) to A58 – Bolton	Information signed southbound only; western terminus of A5062
Greater Manchester	Wigan	129.6	208.6	M6 south – The South, Birmingham, Warrington, St. Helens	The South signed northbound only, Birmingham southbound only; M6 north junction 25
Greater Manchester	Wigan	132.5– 132.6	213.2– 213.4	A577 west (Caroline Street) to A571 – Skelmersdale, St. Helens	Southern terminus of A577 concurrency
Greater Manchester	Wigan	132.7– 132.8	213.6– 213.7	Darlington Street (A577 east) / A573 / A58 / M61 – Town centre, Bolton, Manchester	Town centre signed southbound only, other information northbound only; eastern terminus of A577 concurrency
Greater Manchester	Wigan	133.0	214.0	A573 south (School Lane) / Crompton Street – Golborne, Abram	Northern terminus of A573
Greater Manchester	Standish	135.1	217.4	A5106 north (Chorley Road) to B5239 – Chorley, Aspull, Haigh	To B5239, Aspull and Haigh signed southbound only; southern terminus of A5106
Greater Manchester	Standish	136.5	219.7	A5209 west (School Lane) / M6 – Preston, Parbold, Wrightington, Ormskirk	Preston signed northbound only, Ormskirk southbound only; eastern terminus of A5209
Lancashire	Euxton	142.0	228.5	A581 west (Dawber's Lane) to A565 – Croston, Southport	Southern terminus of A581 concurrency
Lancashire	Euxton	142.2	228.8	A581 east (Balshaw Lane) to M61 – Chorley, Preston	Preston signed northbound only; northern terminus of A581 concurrency
Lancashire	Clayton-le-Woods– Cuerden boundary	145.4	234.0	A5083 north (Lydiate Lane) to A582 – Farington, Blackpool	A5083 and Farington signed southbound only, To A582 and Blackpool northbound only; southern terminus of A5083
Lancashire	Farington– South Ribble boundary	146.5	235.8	A6 (Lostock Lane) to M6 / M61 / M65 / A583 – Preston, Blackpool, Chorley; B6258 – Bamber Bridge	Northern terminus; road continues as B6258 beyond intersection
1.000 mi = 1.609 km; 1.000 km = 0.621 mi: Concurrency terminus
