= Dutton Viaduct =

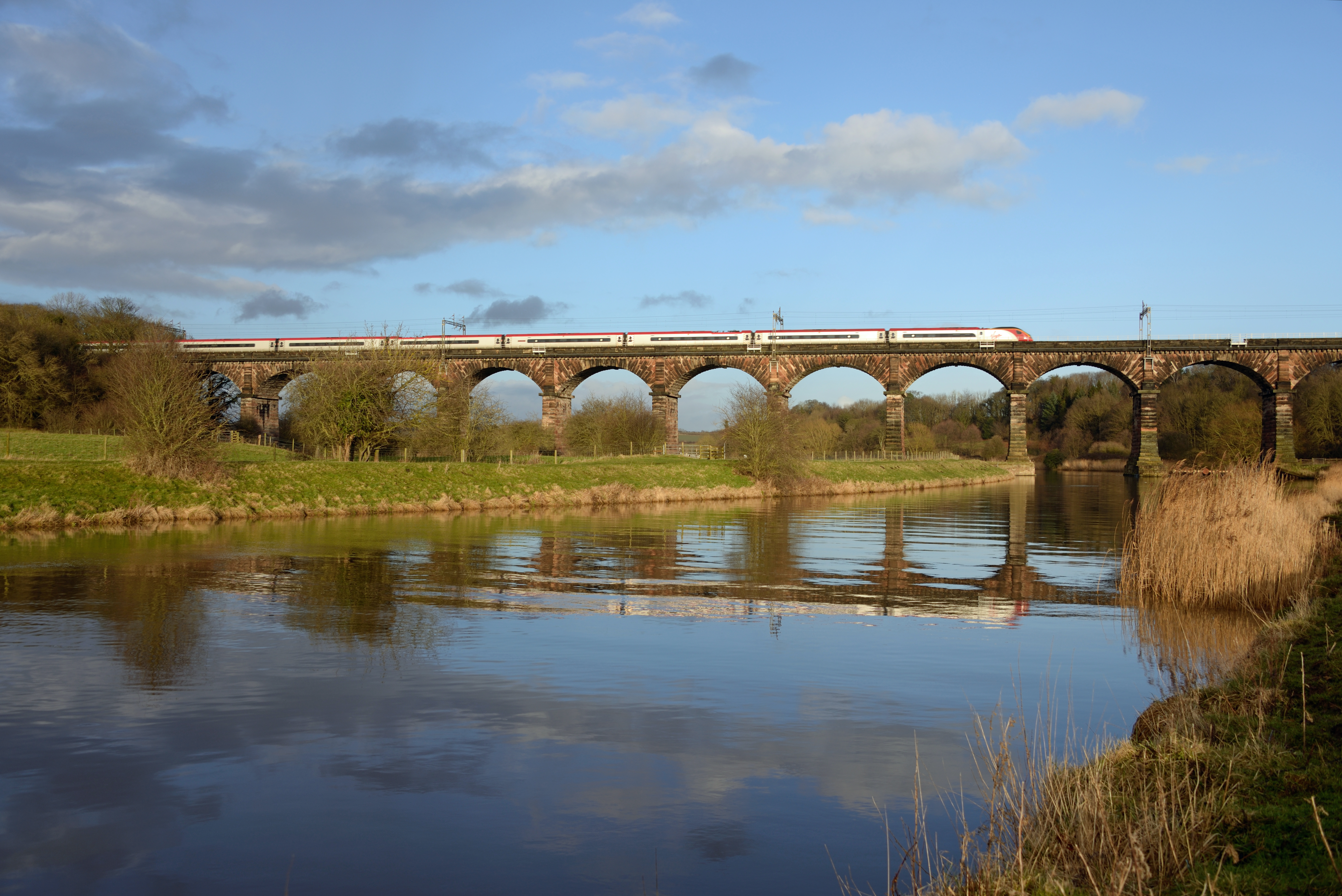
- Dutton Viaduct
- Coordinates: 53°16′59″N 2°37′43″W
- Carries: West Coast Main Line
- Crosses: River Weaver
- Locale: Dutton, Cheshire
- Heritage status: Grade II* listed

Characteristics
- Total length: 500 yards (457 m)
- Height: 60 feet (18 m)

History
- Opened: July 1837

Dutton Viaduct is on the West Coast Main Line where it crosses the River Weaver and the Weaver Navigation between the villages of Dutton and Acton Bridge in Cheshire, England (grid reference SJ581764), not far from Dutton Horse Bridge. It is recorded in the National Heritage List for England as a Grade II* listed building.

The viaduct was constructed during 1836, and was complete on 9 December of that year. It was the longest viaduct on the Grand Junction Railway (GJR). The viaduct was built at a cost of £54,440 (equivalent to £6,470,000 in 2023). The engineers were Joseph Locke and George Stephenson, and William Mackenzie was its contractor.

Since entering use in July 1837, Dutton Viaduct has remained in regular use. During its operating life, it has been subject to change; during the 1960s, the line was electrified overhead lines and supporting metalwork were installed across its length and its line speed was increased to 125 mph (200 km/h) in the West Coast Main Line route modernisation programme. It became a listed structure in the early 1990s.

== History ==
=== Background ===
Dutton Viaduct was constructed for the Grand Junction Railway (GJR), one of the world's first major railways. Joseph Locke and George Stephenson designed the viaduct, which crossed the River Weaver. The route, surveyed by Locke, was relatively free of major engineering challenges, save for the section crossing the Weaver.

The contractor for its construction was William Mackenzie. Dutton Viaduct was the first project to which Thomas Brassey submitted a tender. Brassey lost out to Mackenzie because his estimated cost was roughly £5,000 higher. Brassey was appointed as contractor for the smaller Penkridge Viaduct.

Dutton Viaduct is 60 feet (18 m) high and 500 yards (457 m) long, and comprises 20 deep segmental arches. Primarily built of red sandstone, it has been estimated that roughly 700,000 cubic feet (20,000 m^{3}) of stone was used. The stonework features ashlar dressings, projecting copings, and cutaways on two of the arches that span the river. The pillars of the viaduct have splayed bases, which give the structure a greater degree of stability.

The viaduct cost of £54,440 (equivalent to £6,470,000 in 2023). Construction took place during 1836 and completed on 9 December of that year. It was noted at the time that there were no recorded losses of life or serious injury during its construction. Its completion was marked by a civic celebration. On 4 July 1837, the first GJR trains carried passengers across the viaduct before regular operations started.

=== Operational history ===
By the 1880s, the Dutton Viaduct was regarded as perhaps one of George Stephenson's finest viaducts. Victorian authors praised its aesthetic qualities.

During the 1960s, the West Coast Mainline was electrified; to facilitate the installation of overhead lines, steel pylons were installed across the viaduct. During the early 1990s, Dutton Viaduct was listed under the Planning (Listed Buildings and Conservation Areas) Act 1990 for its special architectural or historic interest. During the 2000s, work completed for the West Coast Main Line route modernisation permitted the line speed across the viaduct to be raised to 125 mph (200 km/h) and the refuges across the structure for use by trackside workers fell out of use.

During September 2017, a 'near miss' incident was recorded when line-side contractors carrying out a structural inspection crossed the tracks between the obsolete refuges in breach of the red zone regulations. Because of limited trackside clearance, Dutton Viaduct was designated a 'red zone prohibited area' during the previous decade, meaning that workers are not permitted on the line when trains are running unless separated by a permanent fence.

In early 2020, Network Rail applied for permission for repairs to compromised stonework in one of the arches; the remedial work was described as being sympathetic to the bridge's historic construction and designed to blend in with the original materials used.

== See also ==
- Grade II* listed buildings in Cheshire West and Chester
- Listed buildings in Acton Bridge
- Listed buildings in Dutton, Cheshire
