= Acton Bridge =

Village in Cheshire, England

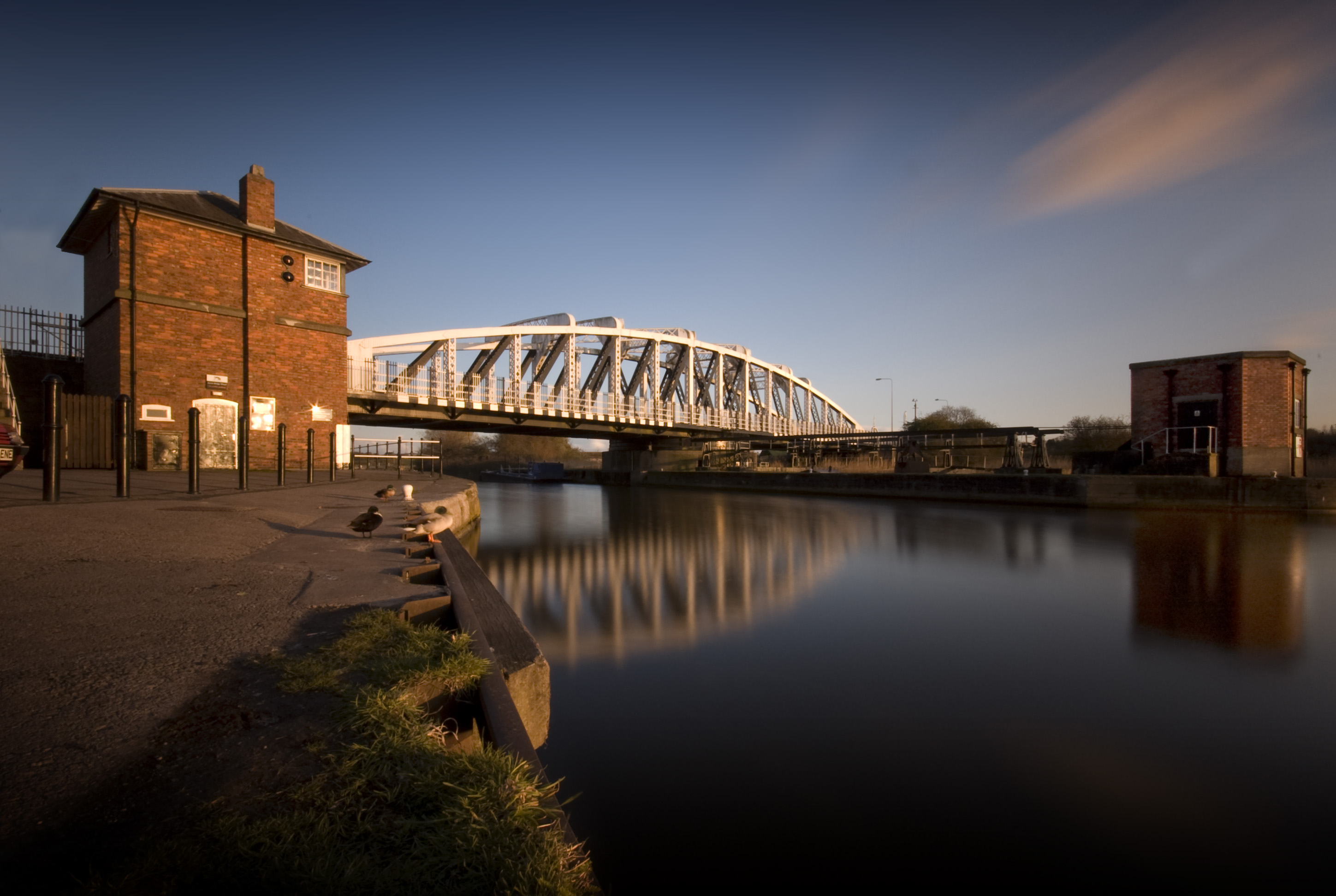
- Acton Swing Bridge

- Location within Cheshire
- Population: 631 (2011)
- Civil parish: Acton Bridge
- Unitary authority: Cheshire West and Chester
- Ceremonial county: Cheshire
- Region: North West
- Country: England
- Sovereign state: United Kingdom
- Post town: NORTHWICH
- Postcode district: CW8
- Dialling code: 01606
- Police: Cheshire
- Fire: Cheshire
- Ambulance: North West
- UK Parliament: Chester South and Eddisbury

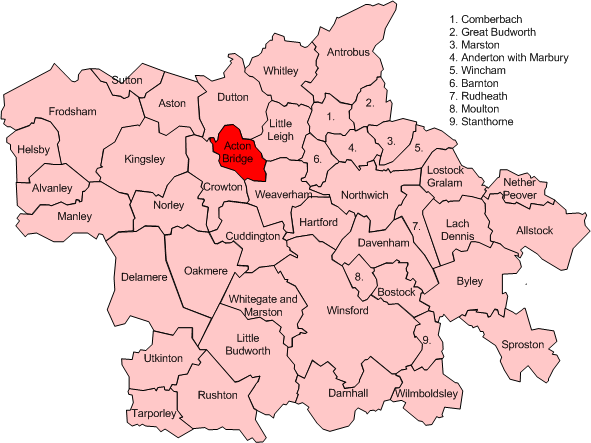
Map of the civil parish of Acton Bridge within the former borough of Vale Royal

Acton Bridge (formerly Acton) is a village and civil parish in Cheshire, England. It is within the unitary authority of Cheshire West and Chester on the River Weaver, at approximately 53˚ 16′ N, 2˚ 36′ W. It has a population of 602, increasing to 631 at the 2011 Census. Acton Bridge is served by its own railway station, operated by London Northwestern.

Acton Swing Bridge, begun in 1931 and opened in November 1933, carries the A49 road over the River Weaver between Acton Bridge and the hamlet of Bartington to the north. The Trent and Mersey Canal runs parallel to the river through the parish north of the Weaver.

Acton Bridge Parish Council meets in the Parish Rooms. There is an active Community Association, and a number of other organisations exist within the village.

== See also ==
- Listed buildings in Acton Bridge
