= River Weaver =

River in Cheshire, England

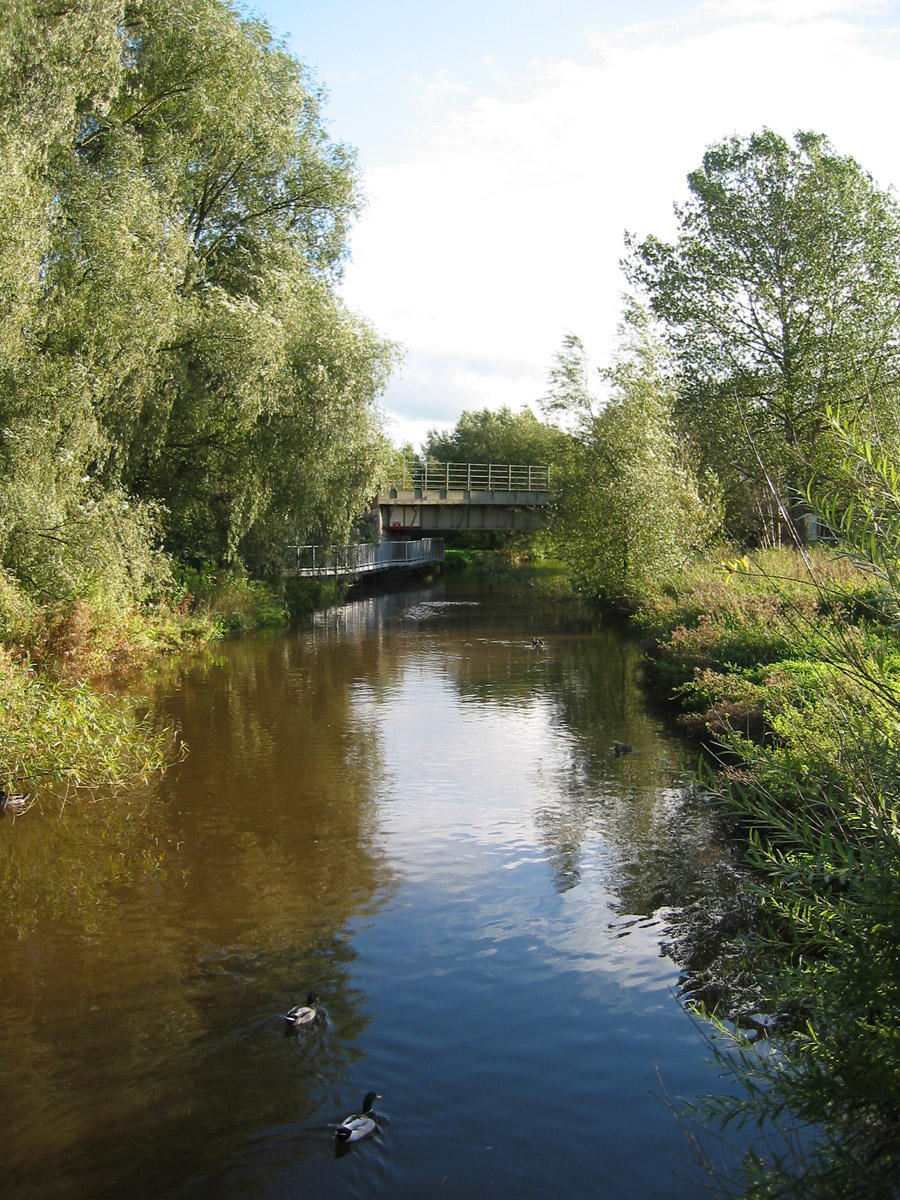
- River Weaver at Nantwich (showing Crewe-Whitchurch railway bridge)

Location
- Country: England
- County: Cheshire
- District: Cheshire East, Cheshire West and Chester, Halton

Physical characteristics
- Source
  - location: near Peckforton, Cheshire
  - coordinates: 53.0972°N 2.6941°W
  - elevation: 89 m (292 ft)
- Mouth: River Mersey
  - location: Weston Point Docks, Runcorn, Cheshire
  - coordinates: 53.3141°N 2.7505°W
  - elevation: 0 m (0 ft)
- Length: 71 mi (114 km)

Basin features
- Tributaries
  - right: River Dane

The River Weaver is a river, navigable in its lower reaches, running in a curving route anti-clockwise across west Cheshire, northern England. Improvements to the river to make it navigable were authorised in 1721 and the work, which included eleven locks, was completed in 1732. An unusual clause in the enabling act of Parliament, the River Weaver Navigation Act 1720 (7 Geo. 1. St. 1. c. 10), stipulated that profits should be given to the County of Cheshire for the improvement of roads and bridges, but the navigation was not initially profitable, and it was 1775 before the first payments were made. Trade continued to rise, and by 1845, over £500,000 had been given to the county.

The major trade was salt. The arrival of the Trent and Mersey Canal at Anderton in 1773 was detrimental to the salt trade at first, but ultimately beneficial, as salt was tipped down chutes from the canal into barges on the river navigation. Access to the river was improved in 1810 by the Weston Canal, which provided a link to Weston Point, where boats could reach the River Mersey at most states of the tide, as the water was deeper. The navigation was completely reconstructed between 1870 and 1900, with the original locks being replaced by five much larger locks, capable of handling 1000-tonne coasters. With the opening of the Manchester Ship Canal, a new lock was constructed at Weston Marsh, which gave direct access to the ship canal without having to pass through the docks at Weston Point. All water from the river entered the canal nearby, and any surplus was released into the Mersey through the Weaver sluices, which were located just upstream of the junction.

A notable feature is the Anderton Boat Lift, which is near Northwich, and links the Weaver with the Trent and Mersey Canal some 50 feet (15 m) above. It was opened in 1875, to allow canal boats to reach the Weaver, and although closed on safety grounds in 1983, it was refurbished and reopened in 2002. Many of the structures of the navigation are of historical importance, and are grade II listed. They include the Hayhurst swing bridge and Northwich Town bridge, which are believed to be the earliest swing bridges powered by electricity. Both have a sectional pontoon, which is immersed in the river and carries about 80 per cent of the weight of the bridge. Dutton Horse Bridge, which carries the towpath over the weir stream at Dutton, is one of the earliest surviving laminated timber structures. Dutton railway viaduct, which was built by Joseph Locke and George Stephenson for the Grand Junction Railway, is grade II* listed, and a civic celebration was held on its completion, as there had been no deaths and no serious injuries to the workers during its construction.

== Route ==
The River Weaver is around 71 miles (114 km) long. From its source in the hills of west Cheshire just south of Peckforton Castle, and within a few hundred metres of the source of the River Gowy it initially flows in a south-easterly direction towards the border with Shropshire, fed by tributaries some of which rise in north Shropshire. The first of three canal crossings occurs just before the village of Wrenbury, when the Llangollen Canal crosses its course. After flowing through the village, it passes to the west of the Cheshire village of Audlem, where it starts to flow approximately northwards across the Cheshire Plain. Shortly afterwards, the Shropshire Union Canal is carried over it on Moss Hall aqueduct. The first significant town on the river is the market town of Nantwich, where a watermill was a feature from the 13th century; 100m further north, an early 19th-century stone bridge, with a single span, crosses the river. Continuing northwards, it passes under the Middlewich Branch of the Shropshire Union Canal before the village of Church Minshull. The aqueduct carrying the canal was designed by Thomas Telford and was built of brick with stone bands between 1827 and 1833. The river flows through a central arch, and there are flood relief arches on each side of the channel. The two waterways run roughly parallel for several miles. They diverge near Winsford, the current head of navigation, and at Northwich the river turns to flow north-west across north Cheshire.

Below Winsford, the course of the river has been altered several times, by the construction of cuts and locks, to enable small ships to trade on it. The river formerly joined the River Mersey at Weston Marsh, but since the construction of the Manchester Ship Canal, begun in 1887, it has flowed into the canal, from where surplus water enters the Mersey by the Weaver sluices, just upstream of the junction. The tidal river section below Frodsham has been bypassed by the Weston Canal since 1810, and is no longer navigable, as Frodsham Lock is derelict.

== History ==
The river runs through the Cheshire salt-producing area, but was not deep enough to allow boats to reach the salt mines. It was tidal for around 7 miles (11 km) to Pickering's wharf, and salt from the mines was carried by pack horse to the wharf, where it was loaded into barges. These used the ebbing tide to carry them back down the river. By the early 17th century, coal was being transported into the area so that it could be used to evaporate the brine, and as the industry expanded, there were calls to improve the river to simplify this trade. There was opposition to the initial schemes, however, from landowners who feared flooding and from carriers who feared a loss of trade, which resulted in Bills laid before Parliament in 1711, 1715, 1718 and 1720 being defeated.

=== Construction ===
River Weaver Navigation Act 1720
- Act of Parliament
- Parliament of Great Britain
- Long title: An Act for making the River Weaver navigable, from Frodsham-Bridge to Winsford Bridge, in the County of Chester.
- Citation: 7 Geo. 1. St. 1. c. 10
- Territorial extent: Great Britain

Dates
- Royal assent: 23 March 1721
- Commencement: 8 December 1720 (Note: Start of session.)
Other legislation
Amended by	River Weaver Navigation Act 1759; Weaver Navigation Act 1807; River Weaver Navigation Act 1825; Weaver Navigation Act 1895
Relates to	River Dane Navigation Act 1720

Status: Amended

Text of statute as originally enacted

In 1721 the first act of Parliament, the River Weaver Navigation Act 1720 (7 Geo. 1. St. 1. c. 10) to authorise improvements to the river was obtained by three gentlemen of Cheshire. The act was dated 23 March 1721 and authorised work between Frodsham bridge and Winsford bridge. Rates for tolls were set, which were to be reduced by 20 per cent once the cost of construction had been met, and profits were then to be used to maintain bridges and highways within Cheshire. Each year the justices of the peace were to meet to decide which structures should benefit from this source of revenue. The act included powers to improve the Witton Brook from the Weaver to Witton Bridge. Following a plea by the owner of brine workings near Middlewich, who felt they would be disadvantaged by the new navigation, the River Dane Navigation Act 1720 (7 Geo. 1. St. 1. c. 17) was obtained on 7 June 1721 to authorise improvements to the River Dane, but did not result in any work being undertaken.

Progress was slow, as only Richard Vernon of the original three undertakers was actively engaged on the project, and he could not reach agreement with the commissioners. The stalemate was broken when Vernon died in 1726, and new undertakers were appointed. The work on the Weaver was completed by 1732, at a cost of £15,885. Eleven timber locks and weirs had been constructed, but no work had been carried out on the Witton Brook. The river had been improved by dredging and the construction of a series of cuts, with locks and weirs to manage the drop of around 50 feet (15 m) over the 20 miles (32 km) between Winsford and the River Mersey. Barges of up to 40 tons could reach Winsford, and boats called Weaver flats were the predominant vessels. These either sailed up the river, or were bow-hauled by teams of men.

River Weaver Navigation Act 1759
- Act of Parliament
- Parliament of Great Britain
- Long title: An Act to amend an Act passed in the Seventh Year of the Reign of His late Majesty King George the First, for making the River Weaver navigable, from Frodsham Bridge to Winsford Bridge, in the County of Chester; and for the more effectual preserving and improving the Navigation of the said River.
- Citation: 33 Geo. 2. c. 49
- Territorial extent: Great Britain

Dates
- Royal assent: 22 May 1760
- Commencement: 13 November 1759
Other legislation
Amends	River Weaver Navigation Act 1720
Amended by	Weaver Navigation Act 1807; River Weaver Navigation Act 1829; River Weaver Navigation Act 1866; Weaver Navigation Act 1895; Weaver Navigation Act 1928; Weaver Navigation Act 1945

Status: Amended

Text of statute as originally enacted

The navigation was not initially profitable, and the amount of money owing to the undertakers gradually rose to a peak of £19,659 by 1740. Toll receipts improved, and by 1757, the debts had been reduced to £9,809. In September 1757, merchants from Liverpool complained about the run-down state of the navigation to Liverpool Corporation, who offered to pay for a survey. The merchants then offered to take over the navigation, but the commissioners wanted to keep control of it, and paid £17,000 to the undertakers, which repaid the outstanding debt and bought the navigation rights. The deal was completed on 11 October 1758. The commissioners largely ignored the survey which had been carried out by Henry Berry, and decided to enlarge the locks to 17.3 feet (5.3 m) wide. Work began on a new cut, lock and weir at Pickerings, but in 1759, the navigation was cut in half by the collapse of a salt pit at Northwich. The commissioners discovered that they could not sue for damages, as the provisions of the 1721 act no longer covered the way in which they were operating, and so a further act of Parliament, the River Weaver Navigation Act 1759 (33 Geo. 2. c. 49) was obtained on 22 May 1760. This changed the way in which the debts were managed, and gave the commissioners powers to sue and to appoint a management committee. It also stipulated that all locks should be 90 by 17.3 feet (27.4 by 5.3 m) with a draught of 4.5 feet (1.4 m), but the actual depth exceeded 6 feet (1.8 m).

Debts continued to increase, as the commissioners borrowed more money to fund the improvements. The new weir and lock at Pickerings failed in 1761 and both had to be rebuilt. Work had started on Witton Brook in 1756, but the plans were revised in 1764 to increase the navigable depth to 4.5 feet (1.4 m), and this work was completed in 1765.

=== Development ===
The proposed Trent and Mersey Canal was seen as a threat by the Weaver Navigation Trustees, for it ran parallel to the River Weaver for some distance near Anderton. However, the commissioners pressed on with upgrading the river, completing new locks at Barnton in 1771 and at Acton Bridge in 1778. They also set about repaying their debts, which were liquidated in July 1775, resulting in some of the profits being given to the County of Cheshire, as stated in the original act of Parliament.

The Trent and Mersey was completed in May 1777, and had an immediate effect on trade, which dropped by 25 per cent, particularly in the Winsford area. The downturn was short lived, as the salt trade developed, figures reaching their former levels by 1783, and climbing another 40 per cent to 171,719 tons by 1790. Ultimately, the Trent and Mersey generated significant trade for the navigation, for in 1793 a system of chutes was constructed at Anderton, to enable salt from narrow boats on the canal to be tipped into Weaver flats moored in a dock some 50 feet (15 m) below the level of the canal.

The steady increase in traffic encouraged the trustees to press on with improvements. Witton Brook was widened in 1788, and the lock was raised, but subsidence caused by the salt mining resulted in a new lock being needed in 1826. A longer-term solution was provided by the decision to move Northwich lock to a new site below the town. When the work was finished in 1829, Witton Brook lock was no longer necessary, and was removed. New cuts and locks were built through the 1790s at Vale Royal, Newbridge, Hartford and Hunts, and Butty Meadow lock was removed. In response to petitions, the construction of a towing path suitable for horses was started in 1792, and was completed as far as Anderton by mid-1793. It was later extended to Winsford, and bow-hauling of boats by men was ended.

=== The Weston Canal ===
Weaver Navigation Act 1807
- Act of Parliament
- Parliament of the United Kingdom
- Long title: An Act to authorize the Trustees of the River Weaver Navigation to open a more convenient Communication between the said River near Frodsham Bridge and the River Mersey, near Weston Point, in the Township of Weston in the County of Chester, and to amend Two Acts relative to the said River.
- Citation: 47 Geo. 3 Sess. 2. c. lxxxii
- Territorial extent: United Kingdom

Dates
- Royal assent: 8 August 1807
- Commencement: 8 August 1807 (Note: The Acts of Parliament (Commencement) Act 1793.)
Other legislation
Amends	River Weaver Navigation Act 1720; River Weaver Navigation Act 1759
Amended by	River Weaver Navigation Act 1825

Status: Amended

River Weaver Navigation Act 1825
- Act of Parliament
- Parliament of the United Kingdom
- Long title: An Act to repeal certain Parts of and to alter and amend an Act passed in the Forty seventh Year of the Reign of His late Majesty King George the Third, to authorize the Trustees of the River Weaver Navigation to open a more convenient Communication between the said River near Frodsham Bridge, and the River Mersey near Weston Point, in the Township of Weston, in the County of Chester; and to amend Two Acts relative to the said River.
- Citation: 6 Geo. 4. c. xxix
- Territorial extent: United Kingdom

Dates
- Royal assent: 2 May 1825
- Commencement: 2 May 1825
Other legislation
Amends	Calder and Hebble Navigation Act 1769; Weaver Navigation Act 1807

Status: Current legislation

River Weaver Navigation Act 1829
- Act of Parliament
- Parliament of the United Kingdom
- Long title: An Act to alter, amend, enlarge, and consolidate certain of the Powers and Provisions of the several Acts passed relating to the River Weaver Navigation in the County Palatine of Chester.
- Citation: 10 Geo. 4. c. lxx
- Territorial extent: United Kingdom

Dates
- Royal assent: 22 May 1829
- Commencement: 22 May 1829 (Note: The Acts of Parliament (Commencement) Act 1793.)
Other legislation
Amends	River Weaver Navigation Act 1720; River Weaver Navigation Act 1759; Weaver Navigation Act 1807; River Weaver Navigation Act 1825

Status: Amended

Text of statute as originally enacted

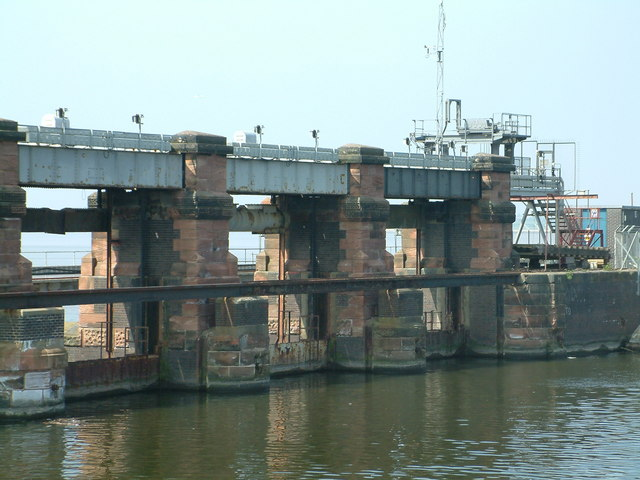
Weaver Sluices on the Manchester Ship Canal discharge water from the Weaver into the Mersey.

Below Frodsham, barges carrying salt had to negotiate a tidal section of the river to reach the Mersey, from where the cargo would be taken to Liverpool or Manchester for distribution worldwide. Water levels were inadequate for the Mersey Flats at neap tides, resulting in them having to wait for days at Frodsham. In 1796, users of the navigation suggested that it should be extended to Weston Point, where the water was deeper. The trustees wanted to pay for this extension by raising tolls, but the users objected, and it took several years to work out a deal which suited both parties. Finally, the trustees obtained a third act of Parliament, the Weaver Navigation Act 1807 (47 Geo. 3 Sess. 2. c. lxxxii), on 8 August 1807, which authorised the construction of a cut from Frodsham to Weston Point. The trustees insisted that their own engineer, John Johnson, should oversee the work, but the project was too large for him, and ran over time and budget. He was sacked in 1809, after serving the navigation for 29 years, and Thomas Telford was asked to complete the work. He managed the project with Samuel Fowls as engineer. At Weston Point, a new lock connected the cut to a basin, and tide gates connect the basin to the Mersey. This cut was called the Weston Canal and was completed in 1810. A fourth act of Parliament, the River Weaver Navigation Act 1825 (6 Geo. 4. c. xxix) was obtained on 2 May 1825, which altered some of the details of the previous act of Parliament, and the River Weaver Navigation Act 1829 (10 Geo. 4. c. lxx) of 22 May 1829 noted that the Weston Canal had been completed. It stated that the trustees had built a basin, piers and a lighthouse at Weston Point, that the Weston Canal was officially a branch of the River Weaver, and that the trustees would make no additional charges for using the section. No tolls had been collected since 1816, once the construction costs had been repaid.

=== Progress ===
The trustees investigated the idea of a junction canal from Winsford to the Middlewich branch of the Ellesmere and Chester Canal in 1830, but felt that water supply would be a problem. New cuts were constructed at Barnton, Crowton and Aston Grange between 1832 and 1835, and they then planned to construct a second lock beside each of the original locks. William Cubbitt was asked for advice on whether the river could be adapted for seagoing ships, and although he said it could, he did not think it would be cost effective. Work was then started on making the river 7.5 feet (2.3 m) deep throughout, and building double locks suitable for 100-ton vessels which were 88 by 18 feet (26.8 by 5.5 m). By 1845, Winnington, Acton and Hunts locks had been improved. Trade was good, with tolls generating £38,363 in 1845 from the carriage of 778,715 tons of goods. All of the improvements had been funded from the toll revenue, and over £500,000 had been given to the County of Cheshire, in line with the original act of Parliament.

Further improvements to make the river suitable for coasters began in 1856, when Edward Leader Williams was appointed as engineer. He oversaw the complete reconstruction of the navigation between 1870 and 1900, a programme which was designed to ensure that the river remained attractive to carriers, and which ensured its profitability. The 12 locks of the 1830s were replaced by five much larger locks, and most of the bridges were replaced by swing bridges, which enabled coasters of up to 1000 tons to use the river.

Construction of a connection between the river and the Trent and Mersey Canal was begun in 1871 and completed in 1875. Because of the difference in level, a vertical boat lift was designed by Edwin Clark, using counterbalanced tanks which were linked by a hydraulic system. A descending tank caused hydraulic fluid to enter the pistons which raised the other tank. The design was a success, but the fluid became contaminated, resulting in corrosion of the pistons. The lift was replaced by a new design, where each tank was attached to its own counterbalance weight by wire ropes and pulleys, with small electric motors to overcome friction. The new lift was built over the top of the old one, so that it could continue to be used until the new one was ready, and the work was carried out by staff of the Navigation, supervised by the engineer J. A. Saner. It was completed in 1906, and continued in use until 1983, when it was closed on safety grounds due to corrosion.

It had been expected that use of the chutes to transfer salt between the canal and the river would cease once the lift was opened, but by the turn of the 19th century, although there were 190,000 tons of cargo using the lift each year, 38,000 tons of salt were still being transferred by chute. From the middle of the 19th century, some of the salt traffic transferred to the railways, and the use of pipelines through which the brine was pumped also affected trade, but as that source of revenue declined, a chemical industry developed in the area around Northwich, which became the major source of income for the Navigation.

=== Locks ===
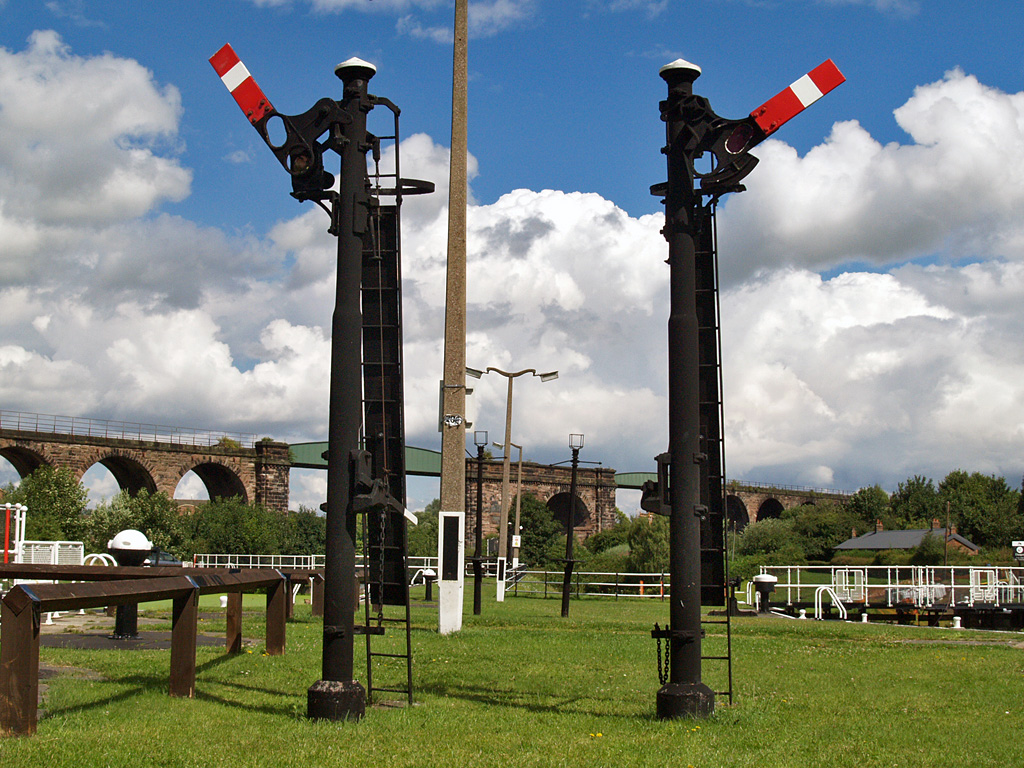
Signals between the chambers at Hunt's Lock, Northwich railway viaducts behind

The locks on the river are paired, with two lock chambers side by side, and in most cases the larger lock also has intermediate gates, so that ships of varying length can be accommodated, without undue waste of water. The maximum size of the locks is 196 by 35 feet (60 by 11 m) above the Anderton boat lift, and 213 by 37 feet (65 by 11 m) below it. The lock at Weston Point Docks is slightly narrower, at 213 by 36 feet (65 by 11 m). The boat lift is designed for canal craft rather than ships, and so can hold vessels up to 72 by 14 feet (21.9 by 4.3 m) with a draught of 4 feet (1.2 m).

== Connections ==
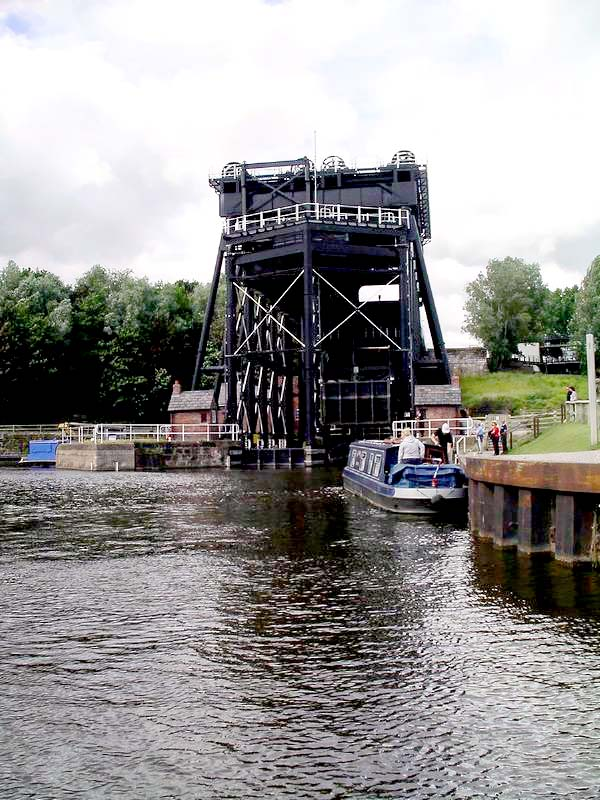
Anderton Boat Lift

Access to the navigation was improved for traditional canal boats with the opening of the Runcorn and Weston Canal, which was completed in 1859. The canal left the Weston Canal at Weston Point, and provided a link to Runcorn Docks, near which two flights of locks connected to the Bridgewater Canal. This link was severed in 1966, when the Runcorn to Widnes road bridge was constructed. Half of the Runcorn and Weston Canal was filled in at the same time.

Significant change occurred when the Manchester Ship Canal was opened in 1894. The tidal section of the river below Frodsham now flowed into the ship canal, rather than the River Mersey, and the exit lock from Weston Docks also joined the canal rather than the estuary. A new ship lock was constructed at Weston Marsh, which provided a more convenient route to the ship canal than the alternative route through Weston Point docks. The Weston Canal has been little used since. Although it is possible for pleasure craft to reach the Weaver from the Ship Canal, it is a commercial waterway, and most leisure users are dissuaded from doing so by the amount of paperwork and the requirements of the operating company.

Situated just below Northwich, the Anderton Boat Lift is now the normal route for leisure boats to reach the river. Following its closure in 1983, a trust was created to campaign for its restoration. The lift became a scheduled monument in 1994, and work eventually started on its refurbishment in 1999. It reopened in 2002, and is once more hydraulically powered. The use of modern hydraulic fluids is expected to prevent the problem of corrosion suffered when it was originally built.

The navigation is managed by the Canal and River Trust (CRT) as far as Winsford Bridge. Beyond this are Winsford Bottom Flash and Winsford Top Flash. Both are shallow lakes, resulting from subsidence in the underlying salt mines. It is possible for some canal boats to explore the Bottom Flash, but the depth of water is limited, and great care is needed. The Flash is used for yacht racing by the Winsford Flash Sailing Club, which is based on the 90-acre (36 ha) lake.

== Tourism ==
The Weaver is a river of contrasts, with quiet wooded reaches and heavily industrialised sites. Commercial shipping has largely ceased, but the ship-sized locks remain. For leisure boaters, most of the movable bridges provide a clearance of 8 feet (2.4 m), although the swing bridge at Newbridge, on the Vale Royal cut, only has headroom of 6.3 feet (1.9 m). Boats which require the bridges to be opened must give prior notice. There is a salt museum at Northwich, which was renamed as the Weaver Hall Museum and Workhouse in 2010, to reflect its expanding scope and the historic building in which it is housed, and a visitor centre at the Anderton lift, which is popular with boaters and non-boaters alike. There are, however, few facilities for the recreational boater.

Rowing is popular on the River Weaver, with competitive clubs in Runcorn, Northwich, and Acton Bridge (The Grange School). Fishing is another pastime which takes place along the river. Several clubs lease fishing rights for different parts of the river from British Waterways, as it holds populations of bream, three types of carp, chub, dace, eels, perch, pike, roach, rudd and tench. Fishing matches are regularly organised at weekends.

The lower reaches of the Weaver between Frodsham railway viaduct and the Manchester Ship Canal are used for sailing. The Weaver Sailing Club is based at Frodsham, and uses a 2.5-mile (4.0 km) stretch of the river for activities which include youth training and racing of several types of dinghy sailboats. Their training courses are accredited by the Royal Yachting Association.

== Structures ==
The navigation has a number of structures which, because of their age, have historic value and are listed on the Listed Building register. At Vale Royal, the lock built in 1860 was retained as a sluice channel when a new lock was built in the 1890s. A swing bridge crosses the chamber. The sluice at the upstream end is supported by two cast iron arches on rusticated piers. A swing bridge, made of wood and iron, crosses the small lock, which was the large lock until the construction of the new large lock in the 1890s. This has three sets of gates, and could accommodate a train of four barges when the outer gates were used. Again, a swing bridge crosses the lock. The gates are opened by a Pelton water turbine mechanism, and other features include a water levelling mechanism and a system for removing rubbish from behind the gates using jets of water which are controlled mechanically. The lock keeper's cottage is also grade II listed. It was built in the 1850s, but was moved northwards by 20 yards (18 m) during the 1890 reconstruction.

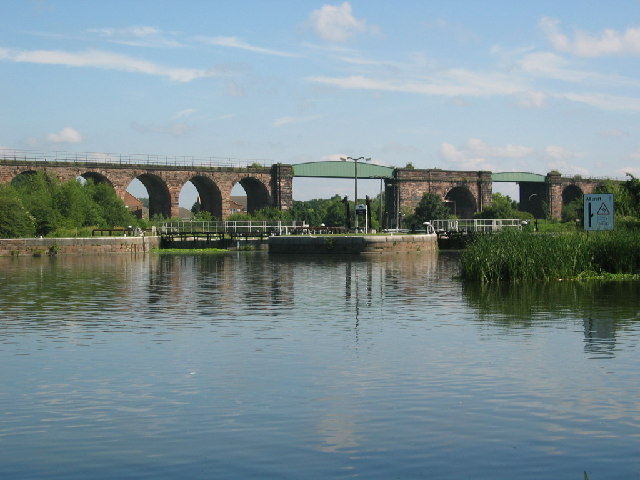
Hunt's locks, with Northwich railway viaduct in the background

Below the locks, a five-arched red sandstone viaduct, constructed in 1837, crosses the valley. It was built by Joseph Locke, and carried the Grand Junction Railway. Hunt's locks also consist of a pair, the smaller one from the 1860s and the larger one, with three sets of gates, from the 1890s. Steel semaphore signals control access to the locks, and again the movement of the gates employs a Pelton turbine. The weir to the east of the locks has a walkway supported by rusticated piers and five cast iron arches, which also support the floodgates. The structure is Baroque in style.

Northwich railway viaduct spans both the lock cut and the weir stream, and was built in the 1860s. It consists of 48 round arches, constructed of blue bricks and red sandstone, with iron spans over the channels. It is around 980 yards (900 m) long, provides 39 feet (12 m) of headroom over the navigation, and also crosses the River Dane. Hayhurst swing bridge carries the A5509 road over the navigation, and was manufactured by A Handyside and Co. Ltd., of Derby and London, in 1899. It is an asymmetric bowstring lattice girder bridge, and its timber-framed weatherboarded control cabin is also listed. This and Town bridge, which is located a little further downstream and is of a similar design, are believed to be the two earliest swing bridges in Britain to be powered by electricity. Both bridges were designed by J. A. Saner, who was the Navigation's engineer, and incorporate a sectional pontoon, which is immersed in the river and carries about 80 per cent of the weight of the bridge. Because of the risk of subsidence from the salt workings, the bridges are fitted with screw jacks which allow the deck level to be maintained. Hayhurst bridge was refurbished in 2004 at a cost of £33.5 million. Winnington bridge, the next downstream, was built between 1908 and 1909, to replace the first bridge which was built in 1901. The original design was flawed, and hence the bridge was replaced after only 7 years. A pedestrian walkway was later fitted on the downstream side of the new bridge.

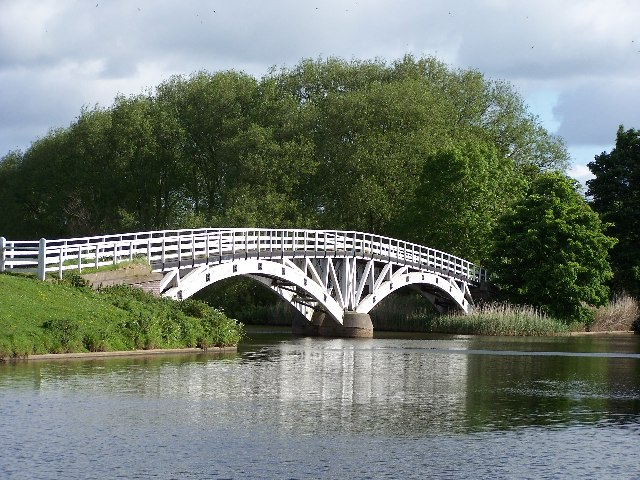
Dutton Horse Bridge, an early laminated timber structure

Saltersford locks were built in 1874, using red sandstone and limestone, and replaced a lock built on the Barnton cut between 1832 and 1835. The Pelton turbines which control the gates were built to Stoney's patent, and carry plates which indicate that they were manufactured by Hanna, Donald & Wilson of Paisley. Acton swing bridge is a symmetrical bowstring girder swing bridge, which was built in situ between 1931 and 1933, on an island in the centre of the river. It was first swung across the channel on 10 August 1933. J. A. Saner was again the designer. Dutton locks are of a similar design and age to those at Saltersford, and the Pelton turbines were made by Northern Foundry Co. Ltd. of Oldham, who are described as turbine makers on the cast-iron covers. Dutton sluice, some 160 yards (150 m) to the north-east of the lock, was built in the 1870s, in a similar Baroque style to Hunt's weir, but is larger, with eight arches each carrying a sluice gate. Where the weir stream rejoins the main channel, the towpath is carried over it on Horse Bridge, which was designed by J. A. Saner, the Navigation's engineer, in 1915, and erected in 1916. It is one of the earliest surviving laminated timber structures, and consists of two arches, both over 100 feet (30 m) long. Below the locks, Joseph Locke and George Stephenson built another viaduct for the Grand Junction Railway, which was completed in 1836 and is grade II* listed. It has 20 arches, and was built at a cost of £54,440 by a London civil engineering contractor called David McIntosh. A civic celebration was held on its completion, as there had been no deaths and no serious injuries to the workers during its construction. The navigation has since been re-routed, and now passes through a different arch of the structure.

The weir at Frodsham was built in 1785, although it has been altered subsequently. The main curved section is 49 yards (45 m) wide, and there are two 16-foot (5 m) sluices at the southern end. The adjacent lock, which was designed by Robert Pownall and George Leigh in 1781, was modified in 1830 and later, but most traffic was using the Weston cut by the time of the 1890s upgrade, and so it retained some of its original features. It is derelict, and water flow is controlled by a concrete and steel sluice erected in the mid 20th century. A red sandstone and limestone bridge carries the A56 road over the channel below the lock. It was built in 1850, and has three 27-yard (25 m) arches. The A56 crosses the main channel on Sutton swing bridge, which was built in the 1920s. There have been problems with the stability of the road surface, and options to secure its long-term future and appearance were discussed in 2010. A £4.5 million restoration project began in the summer of 2013, with the construction of a temporary bridge to carry the traffic while the swing bridge was refurbished. Work included fitting a new deck and renovation of the buoyancy tanks on which the bridge swings. During the project, river access was only possible by narrow boats and other small craft. Frodsham viaduct, completed in 1850 and built in brown bricks with a cast-iron central arch, was built for the Birkenhead, Lancs & Cheshire Junction Railway by the contractor Thomas Brassey. The engineer for the project was Alexander Rendel.

== Water quality ==
The Environment Agency assesses the water quality of the river systems in England. Each is given an overall ecological status, which may be one of five levels: high, good, moderate, poor and bad. There are several components that are used to determine this, including biological status, which looks at the quantity and varieties of invertebrates, angiosperms and fish. Chemical status, which compares the concentrations of various chemicals against known safe concentrations, is rated good or fail.

The water quality of the Weaver was as follows in 2019.

Section	Ecological Status	Chemical Status	Length	Catchment	Channel
Weaver (Source to Marbury Brook)	Moderate	Fail	8.1 miles (13.0 km)	12.72 square miles (32.9 km^{2})	
Weaver (Marbury Brook to Barnett Brook)	Poor	Fail	5.3 miles (8.5 km)	4.02 square miles (10.4 km^{2})	
Weaver (Marbury Brook to Dane)	Poor	Fail	39.5 miles (63.6 km)	48.89 square miles (126.6 km^{2})	
Weaver (Dane to Frodsham)	Moderate	Fail	18.5 miles (29.8 km)	23.66 square miles (61.3 km^{2})	heavily modified

Reasons for not achieving good quality include agricultural runoff and the discharge of treated effluent from sewage treatment works along the length of the river. Chemical status was rated good until 2016, but is now rated fail, largely due to the presence of polybrominated diphenyl ethers, which are used as flame retardants in many products, mercury compounds, and the insecticide cypermethrin, all substances which did not form part of the quality checks prior to 2019.

In August 2012, oxygen levels in the river were found to be low, following the death of thousands of fish. The Environment Agency were notified and aerated the water while they investigated the cause of the problem. This was thought to result from naturally occurring algae, which deplete the oxygen on which the fish depend, and may also have been affected by a reaction between hydrogen peroxide, which is used to improve oxygen levels in the water, and traces of detergent. The reaction results in an unpleasant-looking foam building up on the surface, although the foam is not hazardous. The Winsford and District Angling Association, who use the river for fishing, believe it will take many years to restore the six species of fish affected by the incident.

== Points of interest ==
Point	Coordinates (Links to map resources)	OS Grid Ref	Notes
Weston Point docks	53.3292°N 2.7609°W	SJ494816	
Weston Marsh lock	53.3130°N 2.7436°W	SJ505798	to Manchester Ship Canal
Sutton weir, Frodsham	53.3030°N 2.6947°W	SJ538786	
Dutton locks	53.2877°N 2.6220°W	SJ586769	
Salterford locks	53.2717°N 2.5619°W	SJ626751	
Anderton Boat Lift	53.2732°N 2.5305°W	SJ647752	to Trent and Mersey Canal
Hunt's locks	53.2523°N 2.5173°W	SJ655729	
Vale Royal locks	53.2286°N 2.5401°W	SJ640703	
Head of navigation, Winsford	53.1926°N 2.5172°W	SJ655662	
Crossing under Trent and Mersey Canal	53.1270°N 2.5026°W	SJ664589	
Nantwich weir	53.0643°N 2.5245°W	SJ649520	
Crossing under Shropshire Union Canal	52.9953°N 2.5177°W	SJ653443	
Crossing under Llangollen Canal	53.0277°N 2.6133°W	SJ589479	Wrenbury-cum-Frith
Source at Peckforton	53.0385°N 2.6840°W	SJ536558	

== Tributaries ==
The following is a list of those named watercourses which enter the river Weaver on its left (L) or right (R) bank. By convention, the left and right banks are as viewed when looking downstream. Tributaries are listed down the page in an upstream direction, i.e. the first tributary listed (Flood Brook) is closest to the sea (or indeed the river's entry into the Manchester Ship Canal), and tributaries of tributaries are treated similarly. Where a named watercourse derives from the confluence of two differently named rivers these are labelled as (Ls) and (Rs) for the left and right forks (the rivers on the left and right, relative to an observer facing downstream).

- Flood Brook (R)
- Lowe's Brook (R)
- Beckett's Brook (R)
- Dell Brook (R)
- Blackamoor Brook (R)
- Catton Brook (L)
- Warburton's Brook (L)
- Well Brook (L)
- Hatton's Hey Brook (R)
- Whittle's Corner Brook (R)
- Stable Meadow Pipe (L)
- Quickwoods Brook (R)
- Cliff Brook (L)
  - Danes Gutter (L)
  - Crowton Brook (Ls)
    - Small Brook (R)
  - Acton Brook (Rs)
    - Cuddington Brook (Ls)
      - Stonyford Brook
        - Fir Brook
    - Grange Brook (Rs)
      - Handforth Brook
- Longacre Brook (R)
- Dean Brook (R)
- Brakeley Brook (R)
- Beach Brook (L)
- Witton Brook (R)
  - Marbury Brook (R)
    - Cogshall Brook
      - Whitley Brook (R)
        - Norcott Brook
  - Forge Brook (R)
    - Kid Brook
      - Goose Brook (L)
  - Wade Brook
    - Wincham Brook (R)
      - Smoker Brook (Rs)
        - Leonard's Brook (R)
        - Serpentine Water (R)
        - Waterless Brook
          - Tabley Brook (L)
          - Arley Brook
            - Gale Brook
      - Peover Eye (Ls)
        - Red Brook (R)
        - Dingle Brook (L)
        - Bag Brook (R)
          - Snape Brook (Ls)
            - Ben Brook
          - Fanshawe Brook (Rs)
    - Crow Brook
      - Bradshaw Brook
        - Redlion Brook (R)
          - Marton Brook
- River Dane
- Petty Pool Brook (L)
  - Bogart Brook (R)
- Firwood Brook (L)
- Double Wood Brook (R)
- Ash Brook (L)
  - Wettenhall Brook (R)
    - Bankside Brook (R)
      - Crowton Brook (R)
    - Oultonlowe Brook (L)
  - Chesterlane Brook (Ls)
    - Poolstead Brook (L)
    - Shay's Lane Brook
  - Darley Brook (Rs)
    - Sandyford Brook
      - Cote Brook (R)
- Polestead Brook (R)
- Eel Brook (L)
- Leighton Brook (R)
- River Waldron or Valley Brook (R)
  - Wistaston Brook (L)
    - Gresty Brook
      - Basford Brook
    - Wellsgreen Brook (R)
      - Swill Brook
  - Englesea Brook (L)
    - Dean Brook
- Edleston Brook (L)
- Shrew Brook (L)
- Artle Brook (R)
  - Howbeck Brook
    - Wybunbury Brook
      - Forge Brook
        - Checkley Brook
          - River Lea (L)
          - Hazeley Brook (R)
- Birchall Brook
  - Three Brooks
- Finnaker Brook (L)
- River Duckow (R)
  - Coxbank Brook (R)
- Barnett Brook (R)
  - Sales Brook (L)
  - Walkmill Brook (R)
    - Dodcott Brook (L)
- Marbury Brook (R)

== Bibliography ==
- Cross-Rudkin, Peter; et al. (2008). A Biographical Dictionary of Civil Engineers in Great Britain and Ireland: Vol 2: 1830 to 1890. Thomas Telford. ISBN 978-0-7277-3504-1.
- Cumberlidge, Jane (2009). Inland Waterways of Great Britain (8th Ed.). Imray Laurie Norie and Wilson. ISBN 978-1-84623-010-3.
- Hadfield, Charles; Biddle, Gordon (1970). The Canals of North West England (Vol. 1). David and Charles. ISBN 0-7153-4956-2.
- McKnight, Hugh (1981). The Shell Book of Inland Waterways. David and Charles.
- Nicholson (2006). Nicholson Guides Vol 4: Four Counties and the Welsh Canals. Harper Collins Publishers. ISBN 978-0-00-721112-8.
- Priestley, Joseph (1831). "Historical Account of the Navigable Rivers, Canals, and Railways of Great Britain". Archived from the original on 13 March 2016.

== See also ==
Media related to River Weaver at Wikimedia Commons

- List of crossings of the River Weaver
- List of waterway societies in the United Kingdom
- Association of Rivers Trusts (ART)
- Rivers of the United Kingdom
- images of mile markers seen along the River Weaver / Navigation & interactive map of the Navigation
