= List of works by Edmund Kirby =

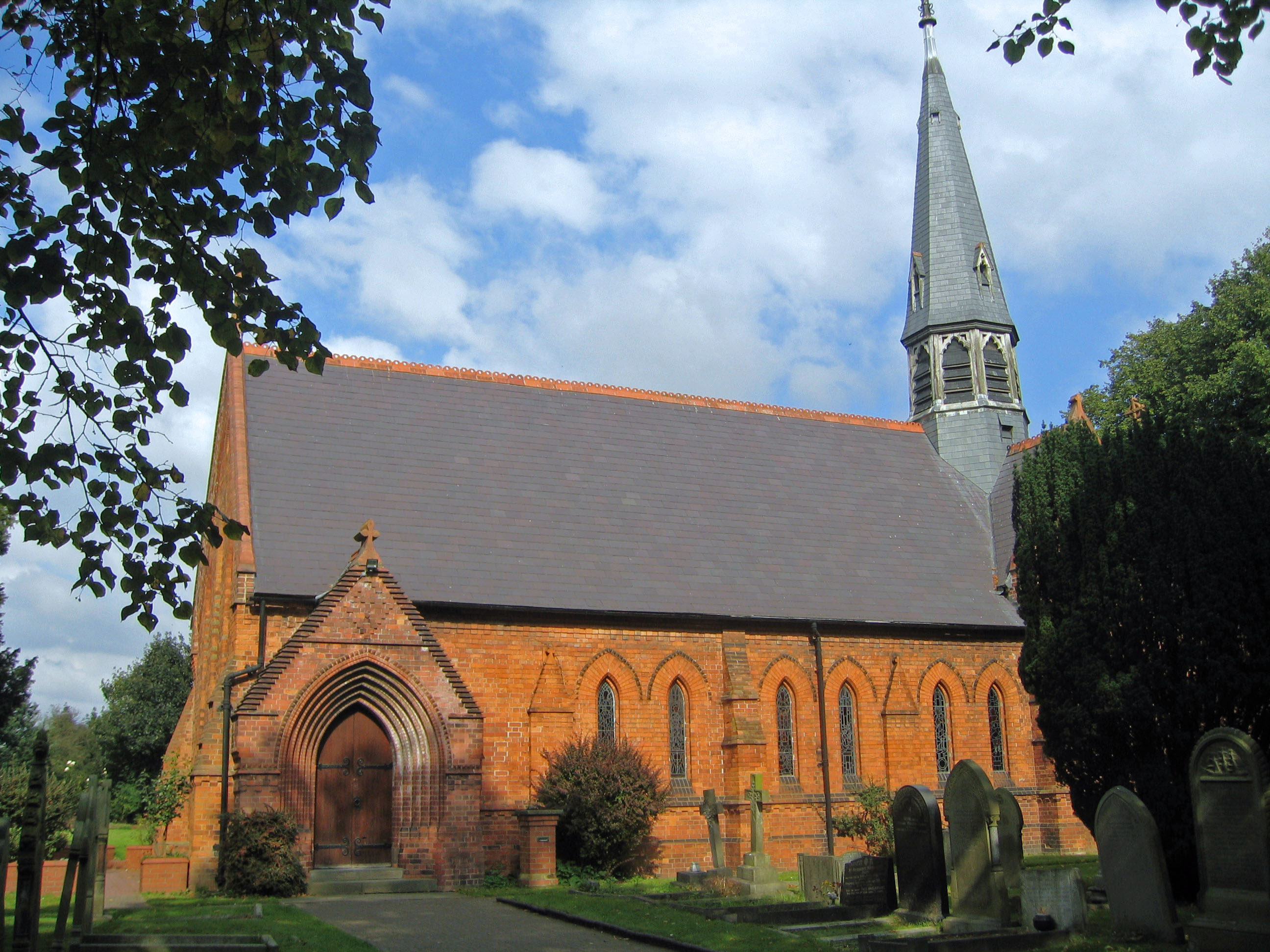
St Michael and All Angels Church, Little Leigh, one of Kirby's Anglican churches

Edmund Kirby (1838–1920) was an English architect. He was born in Liverpool, educated at Sedgeley Park School and Oscott College. He was articled to E. W. Pugin, then worked for Hardman & Co., and for John Douglas in Chester. By 1863 he was practising in Birkenhead and by 1866 his office was in Derby Buildings, 24 Fenwick Street, Liverpool. He was a Roman Catholic and he designed many churches for that denomination. Most of his work was in Liverpool, the northwest of England, and North Wales. He designed 14 churches for the Diocese of Shrewsbury and built 15 Roman Catholic schools. In addition he designed a great variety of other buildings. Two of his sons joined him in his business, which is still in existence. Many of his commissions were for Roman Catholic buildings.

== Key ==
Grade	Criteria
II*	Particularly important buildings of more than special interest
II	Buildings of national importance and special interest

== Works ==
Name	Location	Photograph	Date	Notes	Grade
St Wilfrid's Church	Northwich, Cheshire; 53.2626°N 2.5062°W		1864–66	A new church in red brick with a slated flèche.	
St Mary's Church	Middlewich, Cheshire; 53.1946°N 2.4422°W		1865	A new church in red brick.	
Dee House	Chester, Cheshire; 53.1888°N 2.8872°W		1867	Kirby added a convent wing to the house that dates from about 1730. It is in Gothic Revival style, while the rest of the house is Georgian.	II
Dene House	Great Budworth, Cheshire; 53.2954°N 2.5101°W		1868–69	For Rowland Egerton-Warburton of Arley Hall.	
St Clare's Convent	Pantasaph, Flintshire, Wales; 53.2729°N 3.2628°W		1868–1907	The convent was built in phases. It closed in 1977.	
Sacred Heart Church	Hindsford, Greater Manchester; 53.1911°N 2.8824°W		1869	A new church. It closed in 2004.	II
St Werburgh's Church	Chester, Cheshire; 53.1911°N 2.8824°W		1873–75	A new church in French lancet style. A narthex was made in 1913–14, also by Kirby.	II
St Gregory's Church	Farnworth, Greater Manchester; 53.5483°N 2.3904°W		1873–75	A new church with lancet windows and a north transept. Now redundant, its parish having been united with that of Our Lady of Lourdes.	
St Anne's Church	Ormskirk, Lancashire; 53.5627°N 2.8930°W		1874	Kirby designed the high altar for the church dating from 1850.	II
Blessed Sacrament Church	Walton, Liverpool, Merseyside; 53.4621°N 2.9603°W		1876–78	A new, plain, church in buff sandstone.	
Redcourt	Prenton, Birkenhead, Merseyside; 53.3872°N 3.0493°W		1876–79	Built as a house for George Rae. Later became St Anselm's Junior School.	II
St Thomas' Church	Waterloo, Merseyside; 53.4719°N 3.0241°W		1877	A new church in buff sandstone.	
Methodist Church	Weaverham, Cheshire; 53.2624°N 2.5812°W		1878	Possibly by Kirby; in orange brick.	II
Our Lady's Church	Lydiate, Merseyside; 53.5396°N 2.9600°W		1878	Kirby added the reredos to the church of 1854–55 by J. J. Scholes.	II
St Michael and All Angels Church	Little Leigh, Cheshire; 53.2790°N 2.5783°W		1878–79	A new church in orange brick with lancet windows and a spire over the central space.	II
Our Lady and All Saints Church	Parbold, Lancashire; 53.5913°N 2.7639°W		1878–84	A new church with a steeple, costing £12,000 (equivalent to £1,290,000 in 2025).	II
Trident House	31–33 Dale Street, Liverpool, Merseyside; 53.4079°N 2.9894°W		1879	Built for the Liverpool Reform Club, it has since been used as shops and offices. It was remodelled in the late 20th century.	II
The Tower	Rainhill, Merseyside; 53.4055°N 2.7539°W		1879–80	A house extended by Kirby. Later Tower College School.	
Mere Hall	Birkenhead, Merseyside; 53.3797°N 3.0616°W		1879–82	A new house built for Sir John Gray Hill, a marine lawyer; since divided into flats. The lodge, and the gatepiers and adjoining walls are also each listed at Grade II.	II
Dene Wellhouse	Great Budworth, Cheshire; 53.2928°N 2.5090°W		1880	For Rowland Egerton-Warburton of Arley Hall.	II
Midland Bank	Llanrwst, Conwy, Wales; 53.1409°N 3.7992°W		1880	Built to house a bank, (then the North and South Wales Bank), a public hall, and a magistrates' court.	
Rathmore	Birkenhead, Merseyside; 53.3844°N 3.0661°W		c. 1880s	A new house.	II
Venice Chambers	Lord Street, Liverpool, Merseyside; 53.4054°N 2.9874°W		1882	With a Gothic parapet and decorative brickwork.	
Arnot Street Schools	Walton, Liverpool, Merseyside; 53.4426°N 2.9697°W		1884–94	A long range of red brick buildings.	II
Church of St Thomas Aquinas and St Stephen Harding	Market Drayton, Shropshire; 52.9041°N 2.4802°W		1886	New church in yellow brick with stripes of red brick.	
St Cross Church	Appleton Thorn, Cheshire; 53.3503°N 2.5456°W		1886–87	Built for Rowland Egerton-Warburton of Arley Hall.	II
Saint Francis Xavier's Church	Liverpool, Merseyside; 53.4132°N 2.9698°W		1888	Kirby added the Sodality Chapel to the church of 1842 by Joseph John Scoles. It is "virtually an independent building" and described as a "showpiece".	II*
Church of Our Lady Star of the Sea	Seacombe, Wallasey, Wirral, Merseyside; 53.4114°N 3.0264°W		1888–89	A new church in red and buff stone.	II
St Lawrence's Church	Birkenhead, Merseyside		1889–90	Stood in Beckwith Street; now demolished.	
12 Hanover Street	Liverpool, Merseyside; 53.4025°N 2.9858°W		1889–90	A curved block in red brick and terracotta built for Ellis and Company, consisting of ground floor offices with warehouses above, and incorporating a warehouse of 1863 in Argyle Street.	
Rainbow House	Walton, Liverpool, Merseyside; 53.4426°N 2.9703°W		c. 1890	Built as school board offices, later a nursery school.	II
Providence Cottage	Great Budworth, Cheshire; 53.2944°N 2.5046°W		1891	For Rowland Egerton-Warburton of Arley Hall.	II
Church Hall	Church of the Holy Name of Jesus, Manchester; 53.4648°N 2.2309°W		1892	Brick hall, later converted into a public house.	
St John's Church	High Legh, Cheshire; 53.3531°N 2.4518°W		1893	A virtually new timber-framed church built to replace a chapel by Thomas Harrison that had been destroyed by fire.	II
Sacred Heart Church	Chorley, Lancashire; 53.6495°N 2.6213°W		1894	A new church in red and yellow sandstone.	II
Shakespeare Cottage	Port Sunlight, Wirral, Merseyside		1896	A reproduction of Shakespeare's Birthplace, demolished in 1938.	
St Hildeburgh's Church	Hoylake, Wirral, Merseyside; 53.3909°N 3.1837°W		1897–99	A new church in brick and terracotta.	II
York Dispensary	York, North Yorkshire; 53.9614°N 1.0844°W		1897–99	Built as a dispensary, and as offices for a solicitors' practice.	II
49–53 Corniche Road	Port Sunlight, Wirral, Merseyside; 53.3544°N 2.9936°W		1899	A row of three brick houses.	II
40–50 Primrose Hill	Port Sunlight, Wirral, Merseyside; 53.3574°N 3.0001°W		1899	A terrace of six brick houses.	II
Holy Name of Jesus Church	Oxton, Birkenhead, Merseyside; 53.3846°N 3.0556°W		1899–1900	A church in the grounds of Kirby's house.	
St Joseph's Church	Tranmere, Birkenhead, Merseyside; 53.3787°N 3.0308°W		1899–1900	A long church in red brick.	II
Shrewsbury Cathedral	Shrewsbury, Shropshire; 52.7053°N 2.7540°W		1901	Kirby added a southeast chapel, and in 1906–07, a west porch.	II*
Barclays Bank	Parliament Street, York, North Yorkshire; 53.9584°N 1.0808°W		1901	Has since been altered.	II
St Michael and St James' Church	Haunton, Staffordshire; 52.6949°N 1.6502°W		1901–02	A new church in stone, with a timber-framed bellcote and porch.	II
St Wilfrid's Church	Preston, Lancashire; 53.7573°N 2.7028°W		1902	Kirby added a baptistry.	II*
Church of St Peter and St Francis	Prestatyn, Denbighshire, Wales; 53.3331°N 3.3991°W		1903	Kirby designed the red brick church, and the adjoining presbytery, both of which are listed at Grade II.	II
St Vincent de Paul's Church	Altrincham, Greater Manchester; 53.3864°N 2.3560°W		1904–05	A red brick church with furnishings in alabaster and marble.	II
Queen Victoria Monument	Hamilton Square, Birkenhead, Merseyside; 53.39359°N 3.01602°W		1905	Built in the centre of the square to commemorate Queen Victoria.	II
Our Lady and the Apostles' Church	Stockport, Greater Manchester; 53.4026°N 2.1613°W		1905	A new church in red brick. The attached presbytery is also by Kirby.	
Manor Road School	Liscard, Wirral, Merseyside		1905		
Edward VII Memorial Clock Tower	Birkenhead, Merseyside; 53.38919°N 3.02092°W		1911	Paid for by public subscription as a memorial to Edward VII.	II
St Michael and the Holy Angels' Church	West Bromwich, West Midlands; 52.5187°N 1.9949°W		1911	Kirby added the tower and spire to the church built in 1875–77.	II
St John the Baptist's Church	Meols, Wirral, Merseyside; 53.4016°N 3.1617°W		1911–13	A church with the chancel incomplete, and the tower unbuilt.	
Chapter house Birkenhead Priory	Birkenhead, Merseyside; 53.3900°N 3.0115°W		1913–14	Kirby designed a room in the chapter house that serves as a clubhouse and chapel for the Friends of the former HMS Conway.	II*
