= D. B. H. Wildish =

Vice-Admiral D. B. H. Wildish CB
- Born: Denis Bryan Harvey Wildish; 24 December 1914; Milton, Kent, England, UK
- Died: 2 April 2017 (aged 102)
- Military career
- Allegiance: United Kingdom
- Branch: Royal Navy
- Service years: 1926–1972
- Rank: Vice-Admiral
- Conflicts: Spanish Civil War; World War II

Vice-Admiral Denis Bryan Harvey "Dick" Wildish CB (24 December 1914 – 2 April 2017) was a senior Royal Navy officer. He was born in Kent and was the son of Rear Admiral Sir Henry William Wildish, who also served in the Royal Navy.

== Biography ==
In World War II Wildish was appointed as damage control lieutenant of Prince of Wales in 1940, and directed her emergency repairs following the Battle of the Denmark Strait. He was wounded when Prince of Wales was sunk on 10 December 1941, and subsequently assigned to the Singapore naval base until February 1942. Wildish avoided capture when Singapore fell, being transferred to the destroyer Isis.

Postwar, Wildish was Superintendent of HM Dockyard, Devonport, and Director General of Personal Services and Naval Training. He was promoted to vice admiral on 6 April 1970, and assumed the position of Director General of Personal Services and Naval Training and Deputy Second Sea Lord. He retired in 1972.

== Personal life ==
He married (11 June 1941 at St Hildeburgh's Church, Hoylake) Leslie Henrietta Jacob (died 12 January 2009, aged 88), second daughter of Captain C.W. Jacob, and Mrs Jacob, of Merle Dene, Bidston; they had two daughters. He turned 100 in December 2014. He died on 2 April 2017 at the age 102.
