= St Francis Xavier Church, Liverpool =

Coordinates: 53.4132°N 2.9698°W

St Francis Xavier's Church
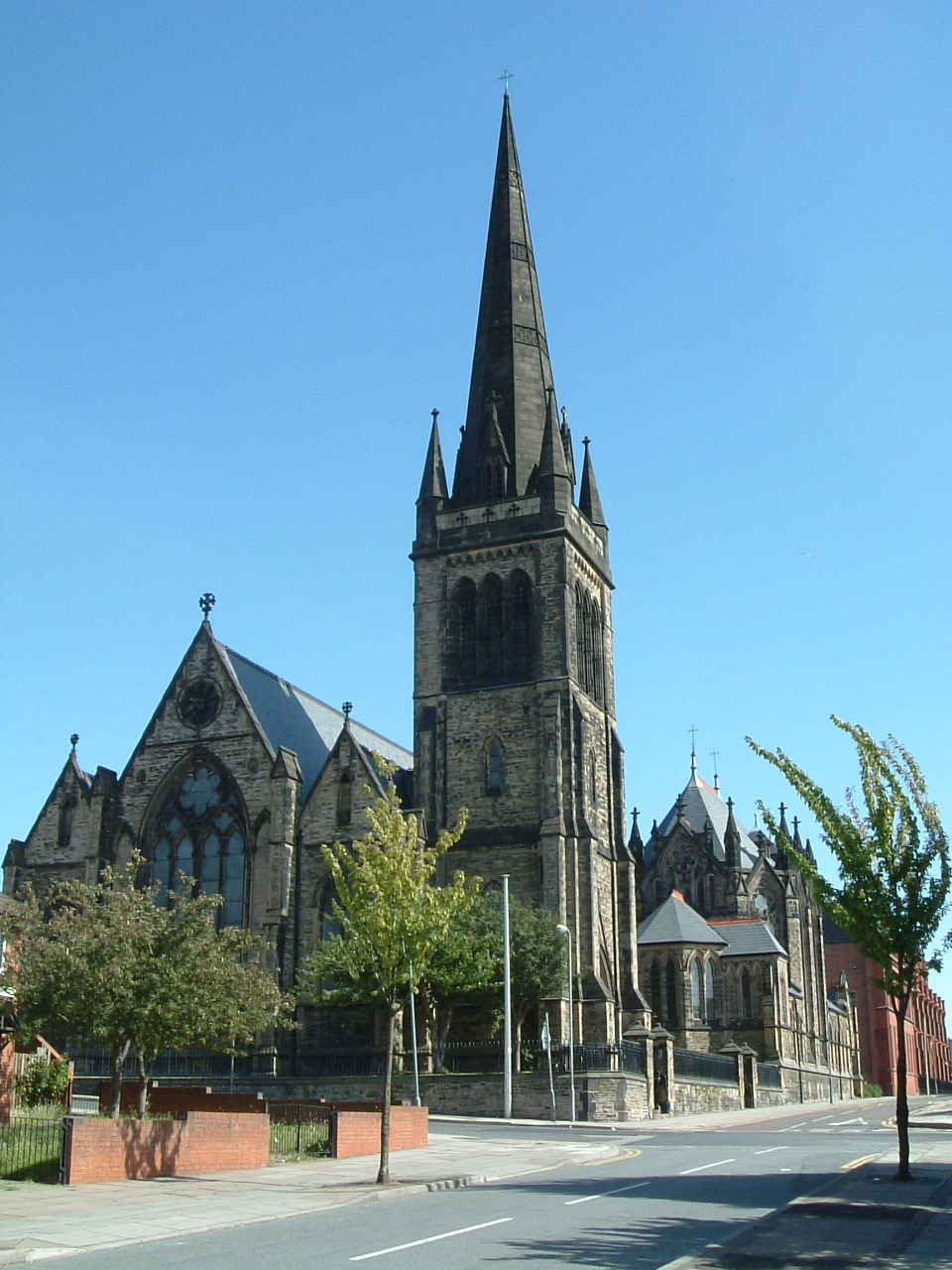
- Church of Saint Francis Xavier, Liverpool

- Location in Liverpool
- OS grid reference: SJ 35636 91165
- Location: Salisbury Street, Everton, Liverpool
- Country: England
- Denomination: Roman Catholic
- Website: St Francis Xavier's Church

History
- Status: Parish church, active
- Founded: 4 December 1848
- Dedication: St Francis Xavier

Architecture
- Heritage designation: Grade II*, 28 June 1952
- Architect(s): Joseph John Scoles, Edmund Kirby
- Style: Gothic Revival
- Groundbreaking: 1842
- Completed: 1887

Administration
- Province: Liverpool
- Diocese: Liverpool
- Deanery: Liverpool North

St Francis Xavier's Church is a Roman Catholic church in Salisbury Street, Everton, Liverpool, Merseyside, England. The church is recorded in the National Heritage List for England as a designated Grade II* listed building. It is an active parish church in the Archdiocese of Liverpool and the Pastoral Area of Liverpool North.

== History ==
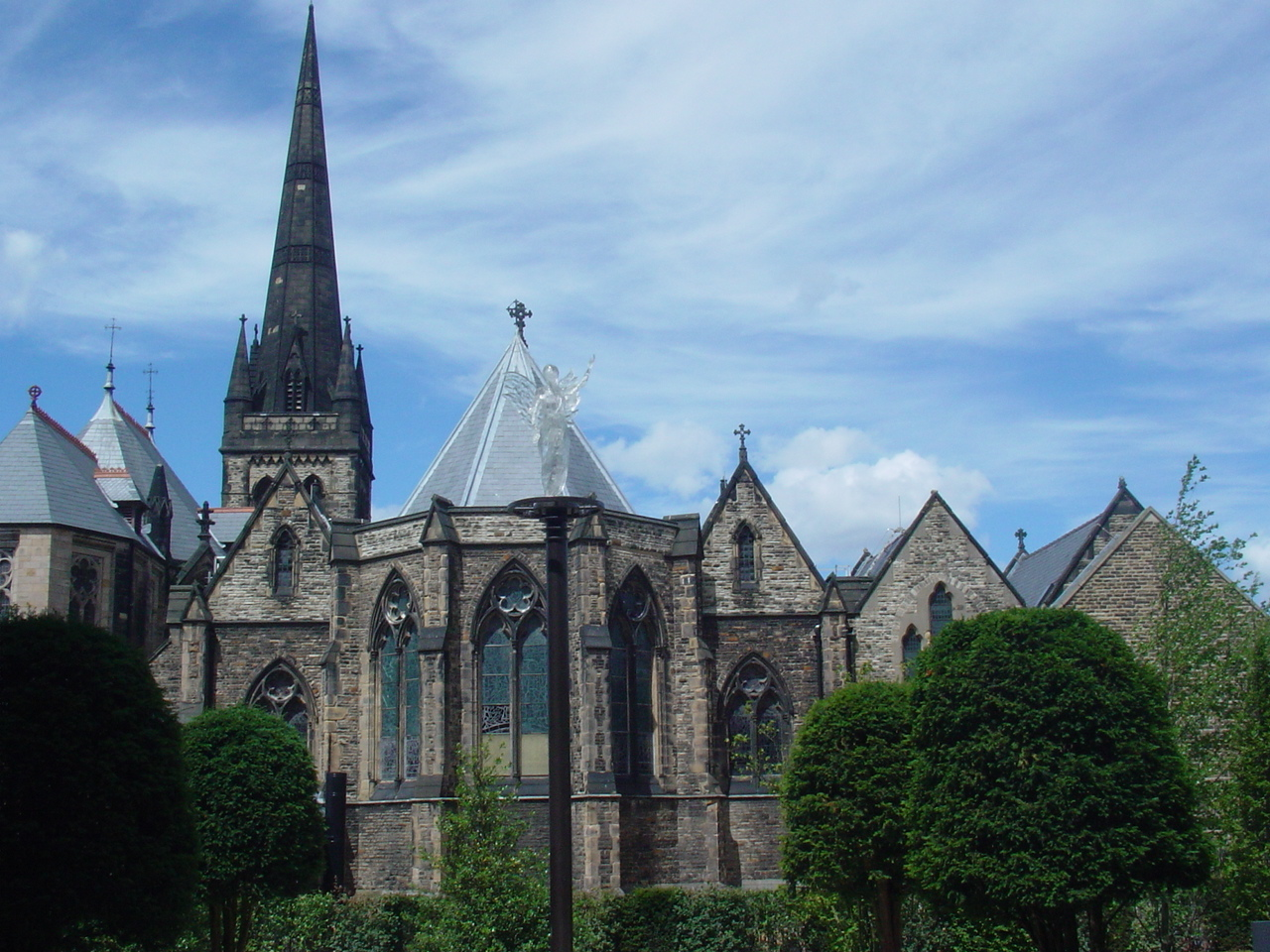
South side of the church

The Jesuits (members of the Society of Jesus) staffed St Francis Xavier's church from its foundation until Easter 2023.

In 1840 the laymen who formed the Society of St Francis Xavier decided at a meeting in the Rose and Crown pub, Cheapside, that, as the number of Roman Catholics in Liverpool was growing rapidly, a new church was needed. The foundation stone was laid in 1842 and Joseph John Scoles was appointed as architect. Scoles went on to design the Church of the Immaculate Conception, Farm Street in London, St Ignatius Church in Preston, and was the father of Ignatius Scoles, SJ, who designed St Wilfrid's Church also in Preston. The church opened on 4 December 1848. The spire was added in 1883. The church had been designed to hold 1,000 people but this proved to be insufficient for the congregation and in 1888 an additional chapel, the Sodality Chapel designed by Edmund Kirby, was opened. In 1898 the wall dividing the Sodality Chapel from the main part of the church was demolished.

The church contains outstanding examples of Victorian statuary and many fittings, including work by Conrad Dressler. It has a collection of Victorian and early 20th century vestments, which are complemented by the addition of modern banners and vestments designed by Sr Anthony, SND, and made by David Pegler of the Metropolitan Cathedral's embroidery studios. In 2007 a shrine to St Mary del Quay – named after the first (1207) chapel in Liverpool – was unveiled at the rear of the Lady Chapel to commemorate the 750th anniversary of the granting of Liverpool's charter by King John.

By the time of the Second World War, St Francis Xavier's was the largest Roman Catholic parish in England, containing over 13,000 Catholics. During the war the church was damaged, particularly the roof, and most of the windows were blown out. From the 1960s the church went into decline, mainly due to the demolition of housing in the parish and the relocation of the majority of the parishioners to other parts of the city. At that time several high-rise blocks of flats were erected in the neighbourhood, but soon vandalised and ultimately demolished. For many years the area around the church was left empty and neglected. Slowly low density housing was built in Everton, mainly occupied by non-church attenders.

In 1981 plans were afoot to demolish the nave, however it was saved following a popular, national campaign. The archdiocese only agreed to support the maintenance of the Sodality chapel, the nave being looked after by the parish. Subsequently, the archdiocese erected a glass screen between the Sodality Chapel and the nave – renovating the chapel, though doing nothing to the nave – which slowly deteriorated. With a change of Jesuit staff a new energy amongst the remaining and former parishioners ensured that by 1997, the 150th anniversary of the opening of the church would be celebrated. A flower festival, celebratory dinner for 600 people in St George's Hall, and an anniversary mass – with the church full to overflowing – helped to overcome the period of decline. In 2001 the parish was combined with the parishes of St Joseph and St Mary of the Angels and the Sodality Chapel was renamed The Chapel of St Mary of the Angels and St Joseph.

The former schools (Infants, Junior, Senior, and Jesuit College) which had been left derelict from the early 1980s were taken over by Liverpool Hope University in the late 1990s. They now form their Creative Campus, accommodating their arts and drama departments.

Alumni of the SFX schools include: John Gregson, Charlie Chaplin, Bishops Vincent Malone and Paul Gallagher, and the playwright Jimmy McGovern. Archbishop Thomas Roberts SJ, a local man, was consecrated archbishop of Bombay in SFX. Jesuit poet Fr Gerard Manley Hopkins, ministered at the parish for two years and is commemorated by a plaque near to the Langsdale St entrance.

== Architecture ==
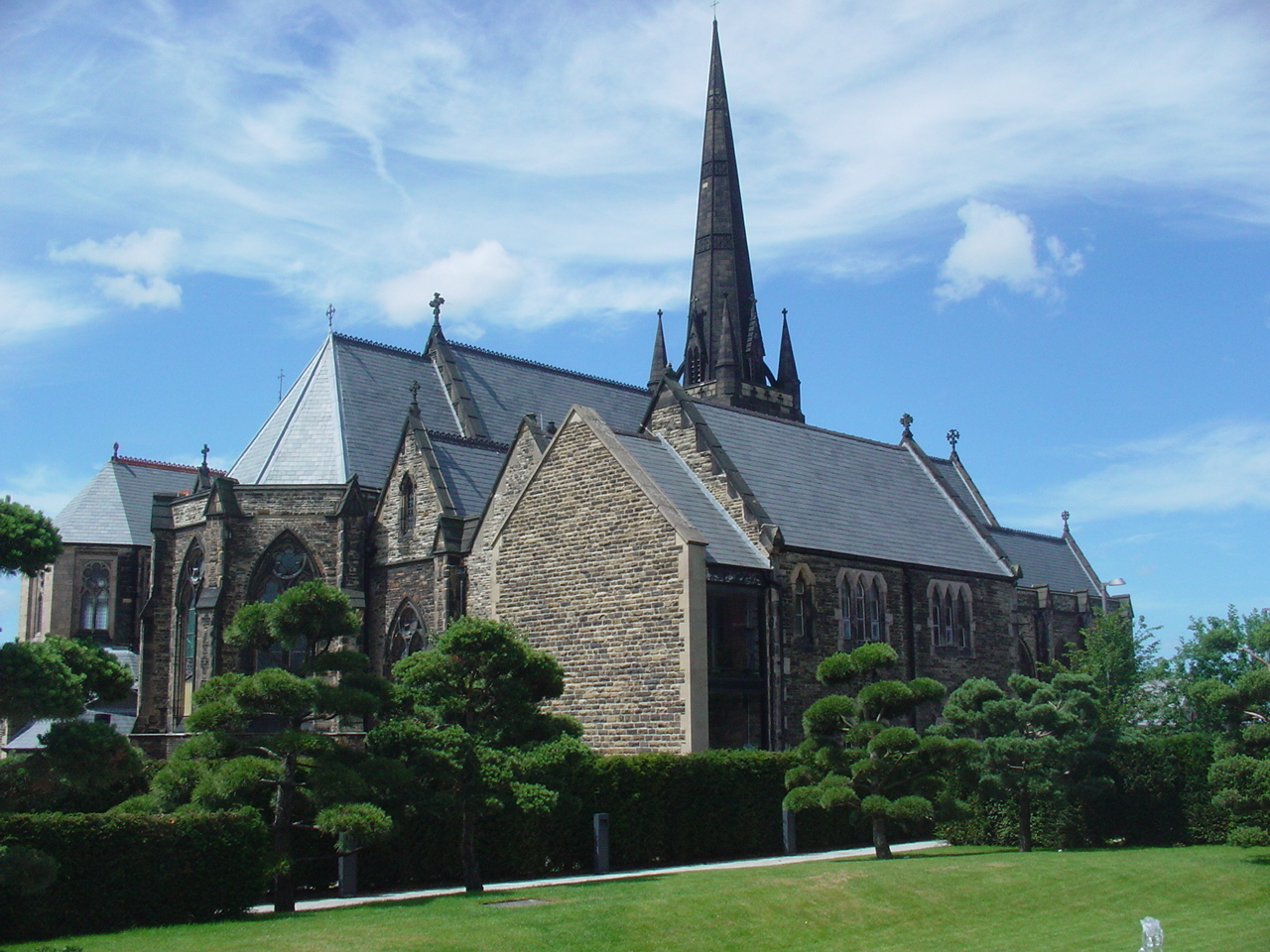
View from Angel Field Renaissance Garden

=== Exterior ===
The church is built in stone with Welsh slate roofs. Its plan consists of an eight-bay nave with north and south aisles under separate gabled roofs, and a short one-bay chancel with chapels to the north and south. To the southwest is a tower with a spire and to the southeast is the Sodality Chapel. This chapel is polygonal in plan with apse at the west and an ambulatory at the east end.

In 2000 the roof was replaced and since then the building was rewired and a new heating system installed. Heritage Lottery grants paid for the exterior stonework being renovated and 'The Friends of SFX' association paid for several small-scale improvements, including the renovation of a stained glass window of St Ignatius which was blown out during the blitz and discovered in a box in the church attic.

=== Interior ===
The high altar and reredos are in white Caen limestone and include arcades and pinnacles; they were designed by S. J. Nicholl. In the side chapels – dedicated to the Sacred Heart and to Our Lady of the Rosary – are similar altars and reredoses. The side wall of Sacred Heart chapel also contains a fine, life-size carving of Christus Consolator – a copy of the famous painting by Ari Schaffer. The pulpit is made of Caen stone and an elaborate font is situated at the west end of the nave below the organ loft. Stained glass windows in the church are by Hardman and Powell; those behind the high altar and on the altars either side were blown out by the explosion of a nearby incendiary bomb during the Second World War and replaced in 1945. The window in the organ loft is dated 1935 and the windows above the pieta statue (the Window of the Hidden Saints) and under the organ loft are by Linda Walton, dated 1997 and 2000 respectively. There are also two 1950s Hardma's studios windows of St Nicholas and St George near the Langsdale Street entrance. The stained glass in the Sodality Chapel was designed by Edmund Kirby and made by Burlison and Grylls. There is a ring of eight bells cast in 1920 by John Taylor & Co. which were re-hung in 2002–03. The four-manual organ was built in 1849 by Gray & Davison and rebuilt and enlarged in 1907 by William Hill & Son.

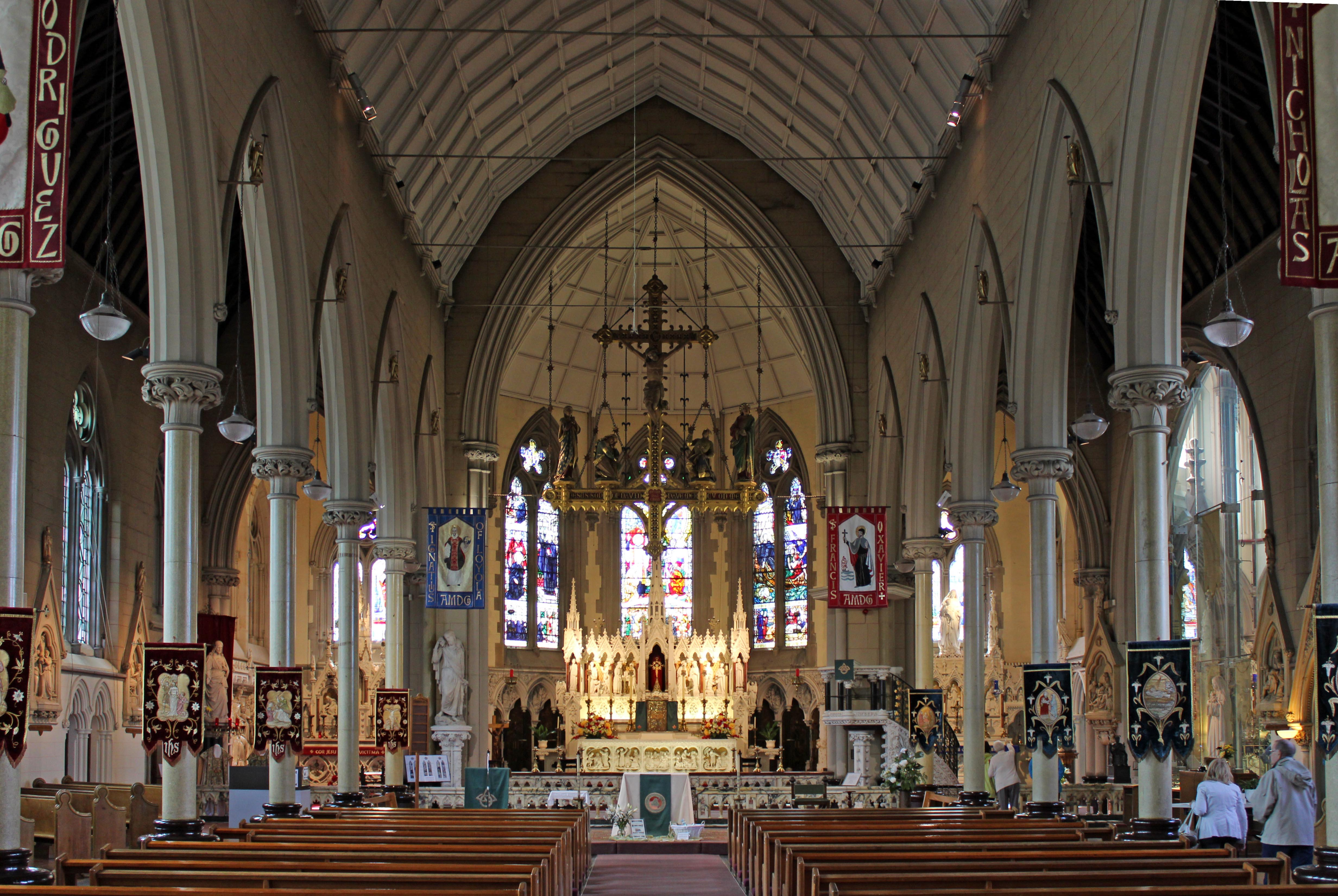
Nave

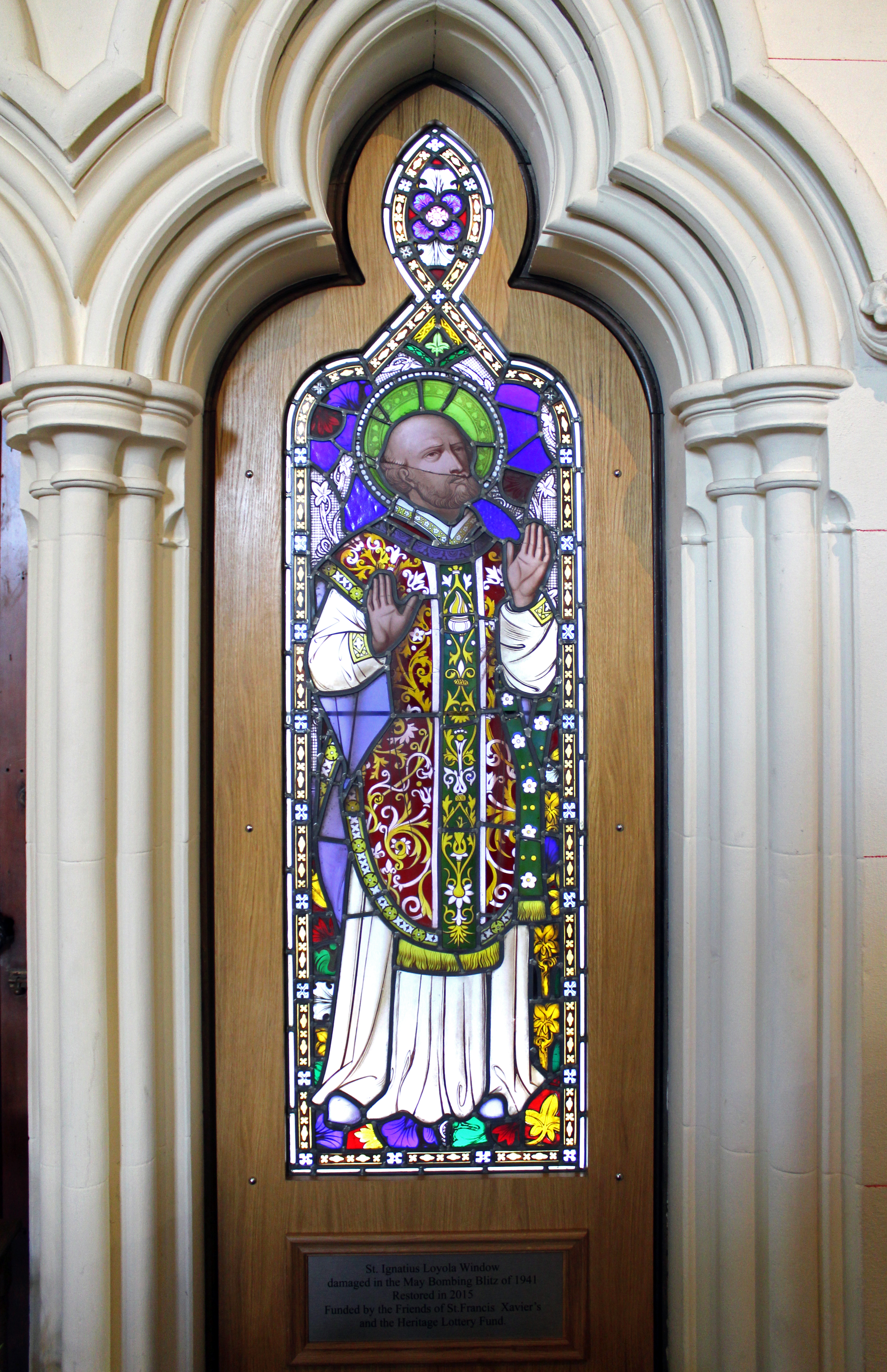
St Ignatius window, 1850, reconstructed in 2015 from a found fragment

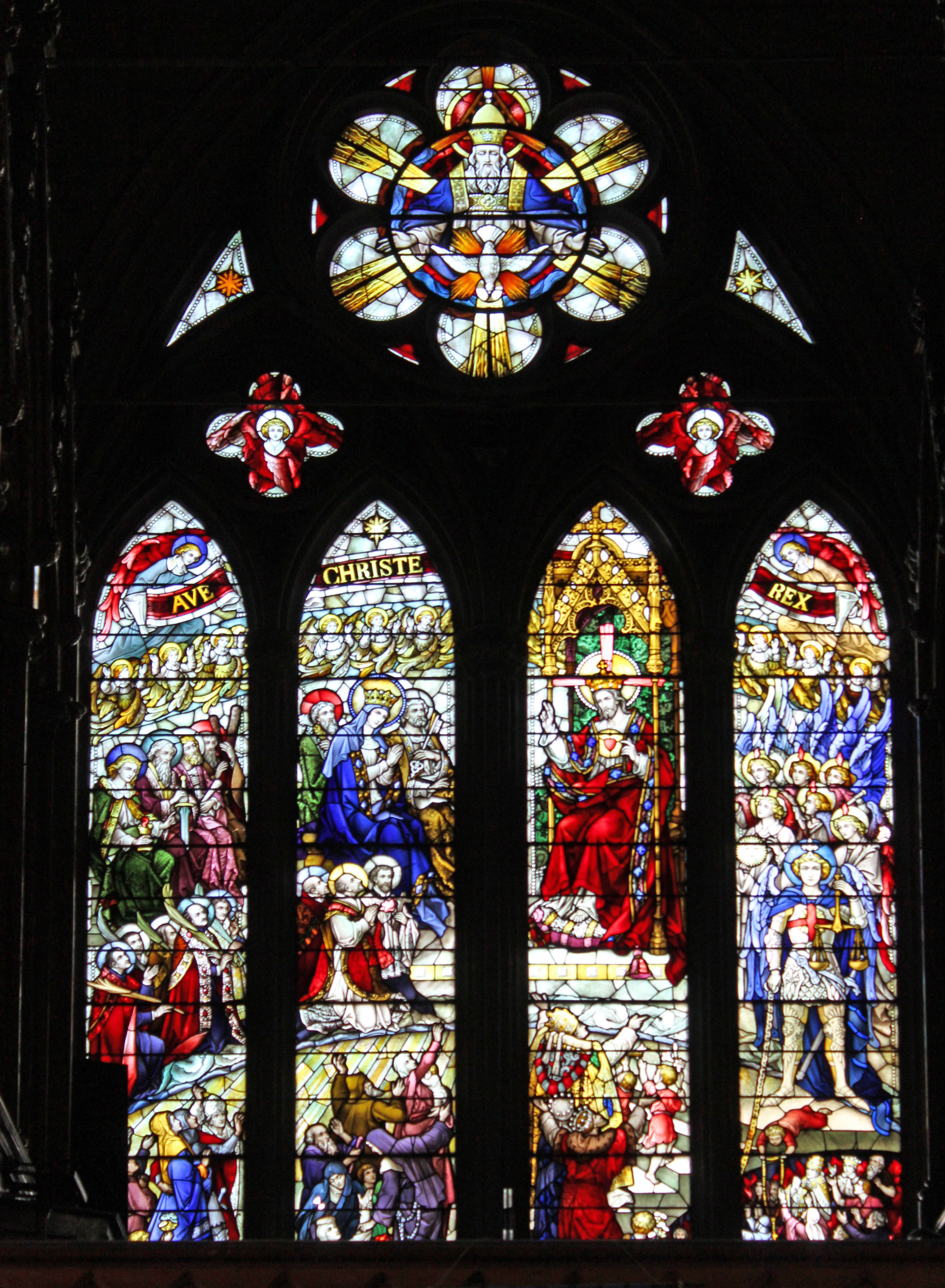
Christ the King window by Hardman & Co. over the organ loft

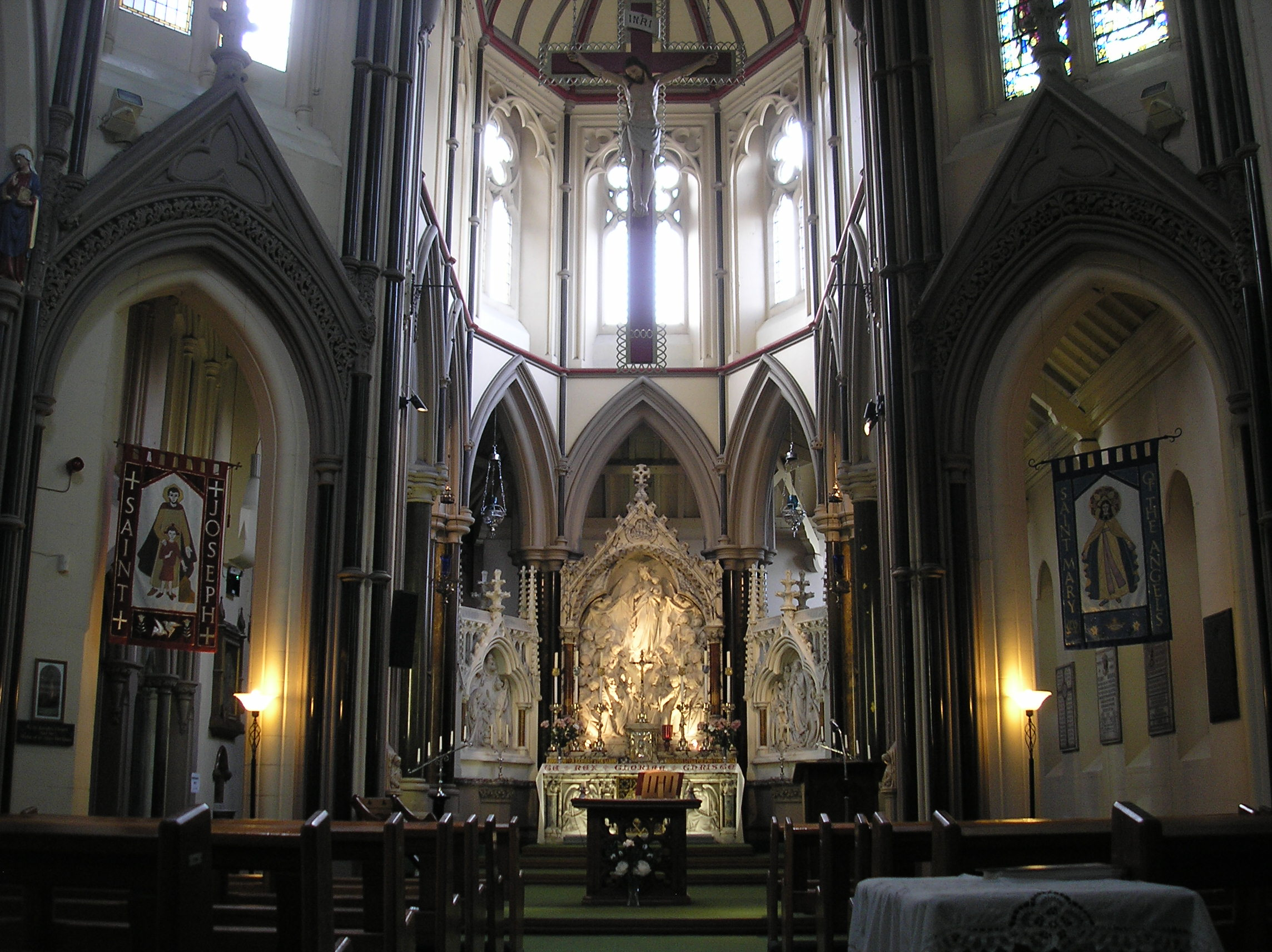
Side chapel of St Mary of the Angels and St Joseph

== Present day ==
The church is open on most mornings of the week (but closed on Wednesdays). Services are at 10:15 on Sundays and at midday on weekdays. The bells are maintained and rung regularly by the Liverpool Universities Society of Change Ringers.

To celebrate Liverpool being the European Capital of Culture during 2008, an exhibition was held in the church entitled Held in Trust: 2008 Years of Sacred Culture. This consisted of artefacts from Stonyhurst College, embroideries and church plate from the church's own collection, and vestments from the chapel in the Portuguese Embassy in London. Items on display included a book of homilies of Pope Gregory from 1170, Thomas More's hat, Katherine of Aragon's chasuble, and Cardinal Wolsey's Book of Hours.

In 2010 the former community chapel above the sacristies was renovated to provide a presbytery for the Jesuits who serve the parish.

== See also ==
- Grade II* listed buildings in Liverpool – City Centre
- List of Jesuit sites in the United Kingdom
- List of Catholic churches in the United Kingdom
- List of works by Edmund Kirby
- St Francis Xavier's College, Liverpool
