= St Hildeburgh's Church, Hoylake =

Coordinates: 53.3909°N 3.1837°W

St Hildeburgh's Parish Church, Hoylake
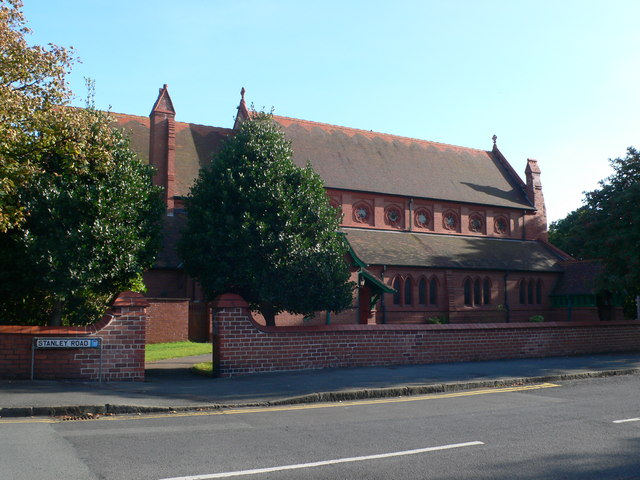
- St Hildeburgh's Church, Hoylake, from the north

- Location in Merseyside
- OS grid reference: SJ 214 889
- Location: Stanley Road, Hoylake, Wirral, Merseyside
- Country: England
- Denomination: Anglican
- Website: St Hildeburgh, Hoylake

History
- Status: Parish church
- Dedication: Saint Hildeburgh

Architecture
- Functional status: Active
- Heritage designation: Grade II
- Designated: 17 October 1986
- Architect: Edmund Kirby
- Architectural type: Church
- Style: Gothic Revival
- Groundbreaking: 1897
- Completed: 1899

Specifications
- Materials: Red brick and terracotta, tiled roof

Administration
- Province: York
- Diocese: Chester
- Archdeaconry: Chester
- Deanery: Wirral, North
- Parish: Holy Trinity Church, Hoylake

Clergy
- Vicar: Revd Paul Rossiter

St Hildeburgh's Parish Church is in Stanley Road, Hoylake, Wirral, Merseyside, England. It is an active Anglican church in the deanery of Wirral, North, the archdeaconry of Chester and the diocese of Chester. The church is recorded in the National Heritage List for England as a designated Grade II listed building.

== History ==
The district that now forms Hoylake was originally in the ancient parish of West Kirby, with the area now occupied by Hoylake, Meols, West Kirby and other surrounding settlements being part of that parish. With the growing popularity of sea bathing from the mid eighteenth century onwards, the existing small settlement of fishing families grew into the seaside resort of Hoylake. This development was very much the work of the major landowning family, the Stanleys. The Stanleys constructed Hoylake's first hotel (called "The Royal") in 1792, on what is now Stanley Road, Hoylake. Close by, they established a racecourse on the land now occupied by the golf links of the Royal Liverpool Golf Club. The growing population suggested the construction of a church for the area and in 1833 Holy Trinity Church was opened on what is now Trinity Road, Hoylake. In 1860, Hoylake became a separate parish from West Kirby. In the years following the creation of the parish, the local population grew rapidly. This was largely due to the opening of the railway line in 1866 connecting Hoylake to Birkenhead and later Liverpool. The growing population of Hoylake meant that by the 1890s, Holy Trinity Church was too small to accommodate all the worshipers. As a result, St Hildeburgh's Church was constructed as a second and larger church for the parish between 1897 and 1899 on land given by Lord Stanley. The church was designed by Edmund Kirby of Liverpool.

== Worship and Services ==
St Hildeburgh's has services and worship in both modern and traditional styles, including Holy Communion in modern language, a monthly family praise service, choral evensong (using the traditional language of the Book of Common Prayer), Messy Church days (every couple of months), informal "Open Worship" (in the Church Centre, behind the main church), Healing Eucharists and services for those in care and residential homes. There is a strong emphasis placed upon inclusiveness and all-age worship.

== Community Role ==
St Hildeburgh's has strong links with the local community. The church is linked to the local primary school of Hoylake Holy Trinity, which was founded by the parish in the nineteenth century, with services held for the school at the church and members of the St Hildeburgh's Ministry Team leading worship in the school. The parish is linked to the local Royal National Lifeboats Institution (RNLI) lifeboats, with the Vicar being the lifeboat chaplain. There are links with many of the care and residential homes situated in Hoylake. There are a considerable number of community activities hosted by St Hildeburgh's, mostly held in the St Hildeburgh's Church Centre (a modern building located behind the church). These activities include a weekly community "drop in" on Tuesday mornings, a group for young people called "Voyagers", a weekly play and worship session on Wednesdays for pre-school age children and their parents/carers, a monthly luncheon club for senior citizens, and soup and sandwich lunches for care home residents, their families, carers and friends.

== Architecture ==
=== Exterior ===
The church is constructed in red brick and terracotta with tiled roofs. Its plan consists of a five-bay nave with a clerestory, north and south aisles under lean-to roofs, a chancel with a north organ loft and vestry, a south chapel, a northwest porch, and a west baptistry. The porch is timber-framed on a brick base. Along the sides of the aisles are alternating paired and triple lancet windows. The windows along the clerestory are octofoils. At the west end are gabled buttresses that rise above the level of the roof. In the baptistry are three square windows, four lancets, and an octofoil at the top. The east window consists of a central cross flanked by quatrefoils. The chapel has a caned end, lancet windows, and a bell in an iron frame.

=== Interior ===
Inside the church the five-bay arcades are carried on round piers of polished granite. There is a low chancel screen, and a richly carved octagonal timber pulpit with a tester. Between the chancel and the chapel is a three-bay arcade with a parclose screen. The timber reredos is richly carved, and includes a panel in tile and mosaic of the Good Shepherd. On the north wall of the chancel are three painted panels, and in the south wall is a sedilia with crocketed gables. The font is octagonal and is carved with the symbols of the four evangelists. Some of the stained glass windows are by Powell's, including the east window, which is a war memorial to members of the Royal Liverpool Golf Club. Elsewhere is a window of 1919 depicting a knight by Margaret Agnes Rope, and a window from the 1940s by William Aikman. In the chapel are windows of 1921–23 by J. Wilson Forster, one of which depicts a Boy Scout being embraced by an angel. In the south wall of the chancel is a window of 2009 showing scenes of the Liverpool waterfront by David Hillhouse.

The three-manual pipe organ was made by Rushworth and Dreaper. A new second pipe organ was installed at St Hildeburgh's with the cost being raised by public subscription in the 1920s. This organ, built and installed by Rushworth and Dreaper of Liverpool, specified by the organist, Norman Biller, comprised Swell, Great, Choir and Pedal organs with both the Choir and Swell organs being enclosed, instead of just the more usual swell organ only. The motor to power the bellows was replaced in 1970 at a cost of £10,000 and the organ was rebuilt in the 1960s.

== See also ==
- Listed buildings in Hoylake
- List of works by Edmund Kirby

== Notes and references ==
Notes

Citations
