= Dee House =

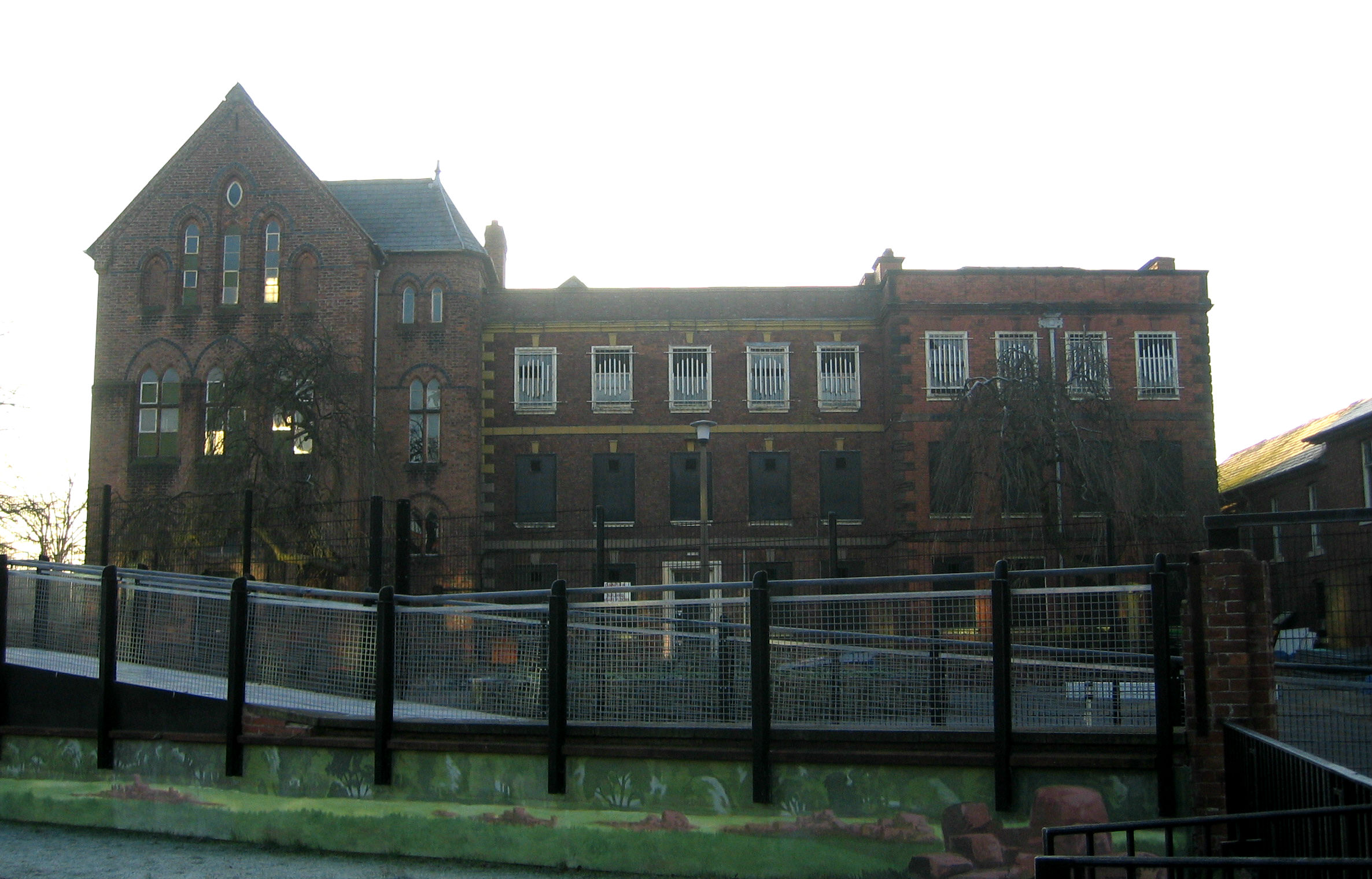
- Dee House

- Location in Cheshire
- 53.1888°N 2.8872°W
- Location: Little John Street, Chester, Cheshire, England
- OS grid reference: SJ 424 664

History
- Built: c. 1730
- Built for: John Comberbach

Site notes
- Architect: Edmund Kirby (east wing)
- Architectural styles: Georgian, Gothic Revival, Neo-Georgian

Listed Building – Grade II
- Designated: 10 January 1972
- Reference no.: 1375862

Dee House is in Little John Street, Chester, Cheshire, England. It is recorded in the National Heritage List for England as a designated Grade II listed building. The house is built on the southern part of the site of Chester Amphitheatre.

== History ==
Dee House was built in about 1730 as a town house for John Comberbach, a former mayor of Chester. Extensions were made in the 1740s to the south and southwest, giving the house an L-shaped plan. It continued in use as a private residence until about 1850, when it was sold to the Church of England. In 1854 it passed to the Faithful Companions of Jesus, a religious institute of the Roman Catholic Church, who used it as a convent school. They added a wing to the east, which incorporated in its ground floor a chapel designed by Edmund Kirby. The chapel is in Gothic Revival style, in contrast to the rest of the building in Georgian style. A west wing in Neo-Georgian style was added in about 1900. In 1925 the building was taken over by the Ursulines, another religious institute. In 1929 they added another block to the south of the building, and during the process the remains of a Roman amphitheatre were found beneath it. In the early 1970s the convent closed and the building was used as offices by British Telecom. They vacated the building in the early 1990s and it has been empty since.

== Architecture ==
The building is constructed in brick with stone dressings, and has slate roofs. Its plan consists of a central block and two wings. The central block is in Georgian style, the west wing is Neo-Georgian, and the east wing, which incorporates the chapel, is Gothic Revival. The windows in the central block and the west wing are sashes, and those in east wing are lancets. The slates on the roof of the east wing are in grey and purple bands. On the apex of the roof of this wing is a cross finial.

== See also ==
- Grade II listed buildings in Chester (east)
- List of works by Edmund Kirby
