= 12 Hanover Street =

Listed building in Liverpool, England

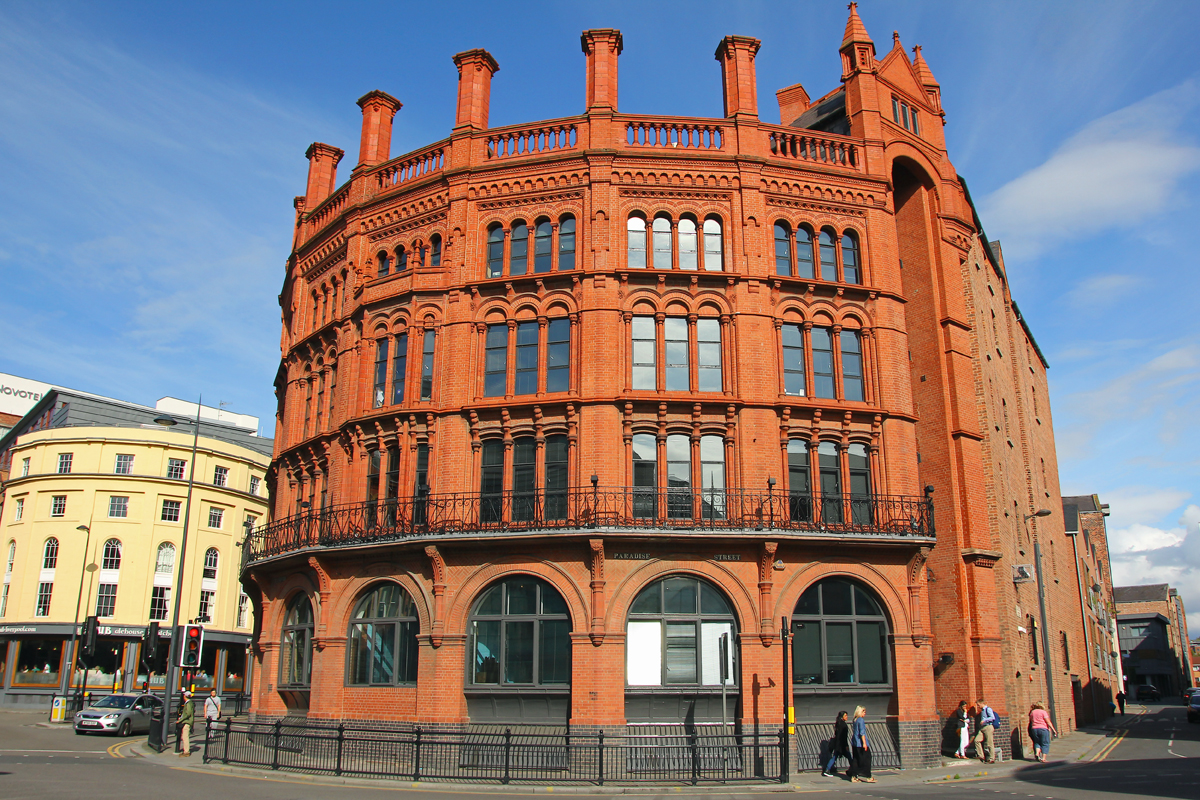
- 12 Hanover Street

General information
- Location: Hanover Street, Liverpool, England
- Coordinates: 53.4024329°N 2.9883133°W
- Year built: 1889–1890

Design and construction
- Architect: Edmund Kirby
- Designations

Listed Building – Grade II
- Official name: 12, Hanover Street, Liverpool, L1 4AA
- Designated: 14 March 1975
- Reference no.: 1207393

12 Hanover Street is a former warehouse building that has been converted into an office. It is located on Hanover Street in the centre of Liverpool, England and is a Grade II listed building.

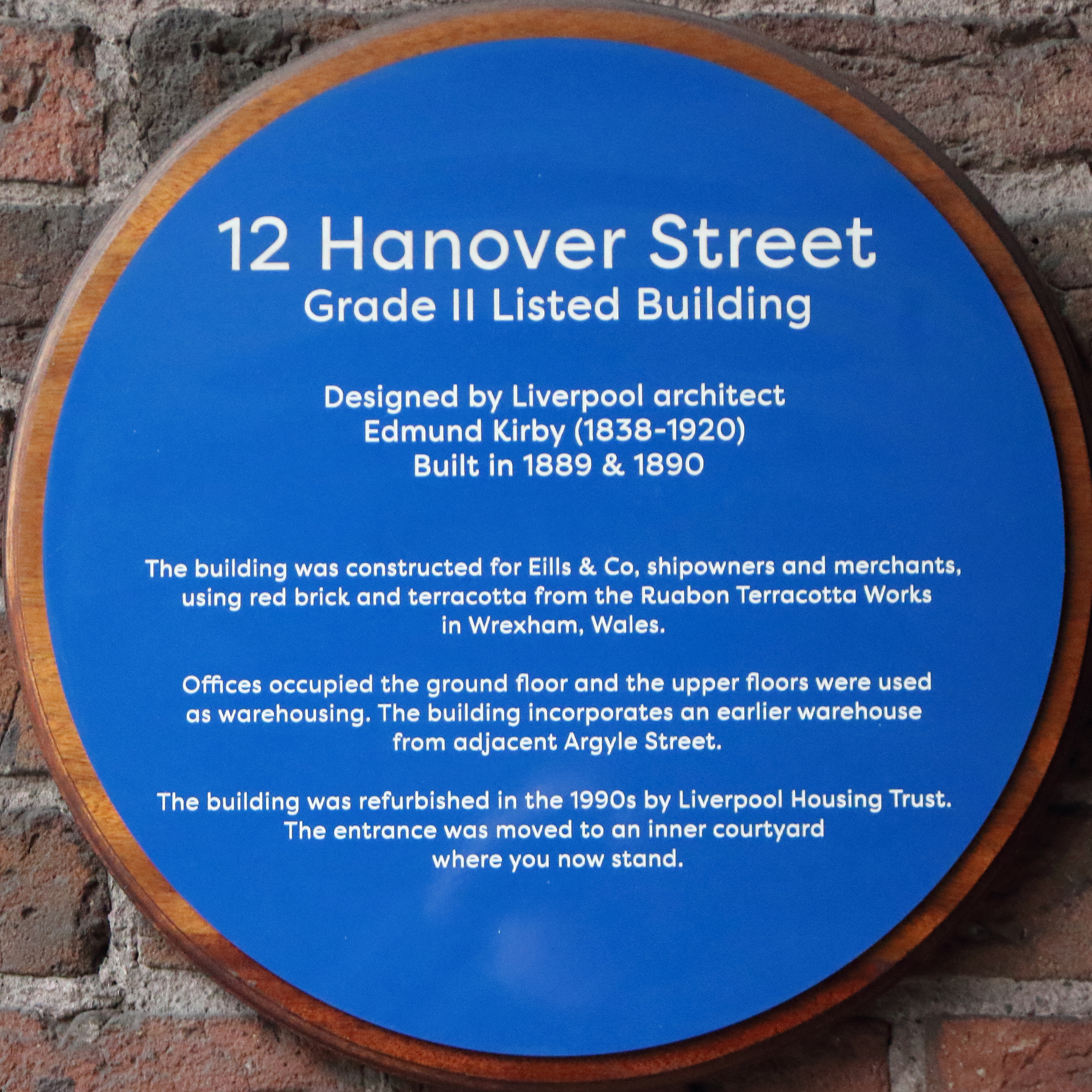
A blue plaque describing the building's history

== History ==
Built between 1889–1890 for Ellis & Co, provision dealers, it originally consisted of a warehouse with offices on the upper floor. The building incorporated an earlier cement and tile warehouse building on Argyle Street that dates back to 1863. Ellis & Co were owned by local MP Burton William Ellis and traded on the site until the 1960s.

In the early 1990s, it was bought by Liverpool Housing Trust who used it as offices for nearly forty years. It was sold in 2020 to a property development company who wanted to turn it into a five-star hotel. The hotel never opened and the building is currently owned and occupied by an insurance company.

== Architecture ==
The building is four storeys, plus a basement, and its frontage is made up of twelve bays. It is constructed of red brick with a slate roof. The red bricks and terracota used were from the Ruabon Terracotta Works in Wrexham, Wales. During conversion to offices in the 1990s many of the original features, such as brick walls, exposed columns and vaulted ceilings were retained.

== See also ==
- Architecture of Liverpool
- Grade II listed buildings in Liverpool-L1
