= Our Lady and the Apostles Church, Stockport =

Church in Greater Manchester, England

Our Lady and the Apostles Church
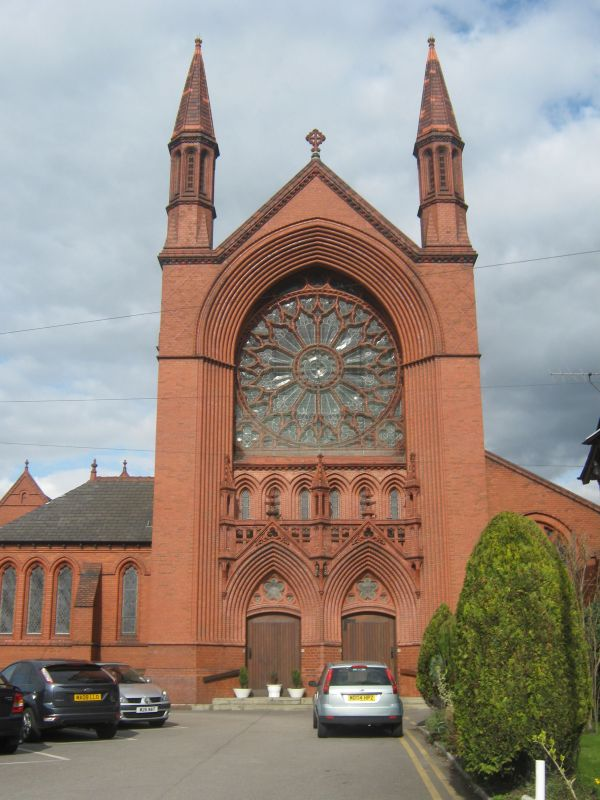
- View from Shaw Heath in 2010
- Our Lady and the Apostles Church
- 53.4027°N 2.1612°W
- OS grid reference: SJ 89378 89550
- Location: Stockport, Greater Manchester
- Country: England
- Denomination: Roman Catholic
- Website: ourladyandtheapostles.co.uk

History
- Former name(s): St Philip and St James Church
- Status: Active
- Dedication: Mary, mother of Jesus, Apostles

Architecture
- Functional status: Parish church
- Heritage designation: Grade II listed
- Designated: 10 July 2009
- Architect: Edmund Kirby
- Style: Gothic Revival
- Groundbreaking: 1903
- Completed: 1905

Administration
- Province: Birmingham
- Diocese: Shrewsbury
- Deanery: Stockport and Tameside

Our Lady and the Apostles Church is a Roman Catholic parish church in the Edgeley area of Stockport, Greater Manchester, England. It was built from 1903 to 1905 and replaced St Philip and St James Church, built in 1803, which was the first permanent Catholic church to be built in Stockport after the English Reformation. It is situated on the corner of Shaw Heath and Greek Street, south west of Stockport College and south of Stockport railway station. It was built in the Gothic Revival style by the architect Edmund Kirby and is a Grade II listed building.

== History ==
=== Foundation ===
In 1776, St Chad's Chapel was opened on Rock Street in Manchester. The priest would travel from Manchester to Sutton to serve the Catholic congregations in Macclesfield and Stockport. In 1794, St Mary's Church, Mulberry Street was opened in Manchester and it became the centre from which priests would serve the Catholics in and around the city. Funds were collected to start a mission in Stockport by the priests at St Mary's Church. On 1 May 1798, a house was rented on Windmill Street in Stockport. It was opened for the saying of Mass on 22 July 1798. From 1801, the priest of the mission, a Fr James Blundell started to raise money for a permanent church to be built.

=== St Philip and St James Church ===
In 1802, the foundation stone of St Philip and St James Church was laid by Fr Richard Thompson, the curate of St Mary's Church, Mulberry Street. On 1 May 1803, the church was opened and Mass was said by Fr Rowland Broomhead, the parish priest of St Mary's Church. The bricks used in its construction were made on site. In the 1830s, with the increasing size of the congregation, the church was enlarged. A tower, side galleries and a larger vestry were added. On 23 September 1832, the church was reopened. From 1845, priests from St Philip and St James Church started a mission in the centre of the town, which became St Joseph's Church.

=== Construction ===
With the increasing Catholic population a larger church was needed. Our Lady of the Apostles Church replaced St Philip and St James Church. In 1905, the church was built. It was designed by Edmund Kirby. The front of the church is similar to Sacred Heart Church in Chorley which Kirby designed in 1894. The stained-glass windows in the church was attributed to Margaret Agnes Rope. In 1925, the sanctuary was redesigned to become a First World War memorial.

The sanctuary was re-ordered in 1989 to bring it into line with post Second Vatican Council requirements.

== Organ ==
The church contains a three manual pipe organ with 49 speaking stops and 2,088 pipes. The organ was originally built by the local organ builders Hardy & Son as a two manual instrument. The organ was rebuilt and considerably enlarged by the Manchester company of Jardine & Co in 1955. In 1985 George Sixsmith, organ builders, carried out further changes including the rebuild of the choir organ as well as adding new pipes and other minor changes. Apart from the changes to the choir section, the instrument remains largely similar to the rebuild of 1955.

== Parish ==
Mass times are Sunday 11am, Tuesday 9.30am, Thursday 7pm, Saturday 9.30am.

== See also ==
- Listed buildings in Stockport
- Diocese of Shrewsbury
- The Hidden Gem
