= St Michael and All Angels Church, Little Leigh =

Coordinates: 53.2790°N 2.5783°W

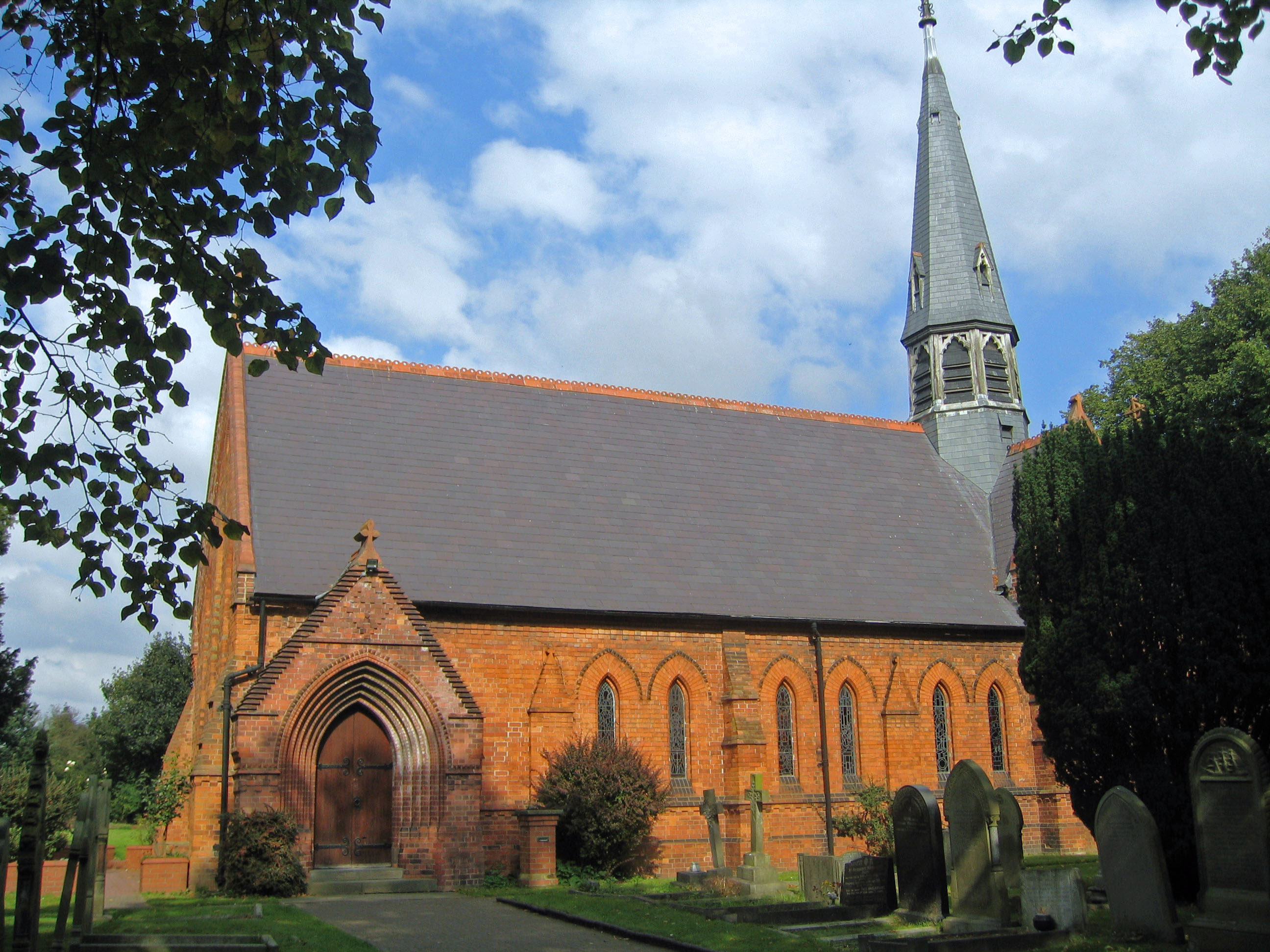
- St Michael and All Angels Church, Little Leigh, from the south

- Location in Cheshire
- OS grid reference: SJ 615 759
- Location: Little Leigh, Cheshire
- Country: England
- Denomination: Anglican
- Website: Parish of Aston-by-Sutton, Little Leigh & Lower Whitley

History
- Status: Parish church
- Dedication: St Michael

Architecture
- Functional status: Active
- Heritage designation: Grade II
- Designated: 18 July 1986
- Architect: Edmund Kirby
- Architectural type: Church
- Style: Gothic Revival
- Completed: 1879

Specifications
- Materials: Brick with terracotta dressings Welsh slate roof with an orange tile ridge

Administration
- Province: York
- Diocese: Chester
- Archdeaconry: Chester
- Deanery: Great Budworth
- Parish: Little Leigh

Clergy
- Vicar: Rev Dr Collette Jones

St Michael and All Angels Church is in the village of Little Leigh, Cheshire, England. The church is recorded in the National Heritage List for England as a designated Grade II listed building. It is an active Anglican parish church in the diocese of Chester, the archdeaconry of Chester and the deanery of Great Budworth. It is one of three parish churches in the parish of Aston-by-Sutton, Little Leigh and Lower Whitley. The others being St Peter, Aston-by-Sutton and St Luke, Lower Whitley. Until 31 May 2013, the three were separate parishes united in a benefice along with St Mark, Antrobus

== History ==
Originally in the parish of Great Budworth, an ancient chapel of ease in Little Leigh was fully rebuilt in 1712 and was described as "a mean building of brick, standing defenceless in the highway". The west end of the chapel was used as the village school until a separate building was completed in 1840. The old chapel stood in what is now the churchyard. The new church was built in 1879 to a design by Edmund Kirby.

== Architecture ==
=== Exterior ===
The church is built in "fiery orange" brick with terracotta dressings. The roof is of Welsh slate with an orange tile ridge. The plan of the church consists of a four-bay nave with short transepts, a one-bay chancel, a south porch and a spire at the crossing. It is in Gothic style. The bays of the nave are divided alternately by buttresses and triangular-headed pilasters between which are paired lancet windows. The spire is a large flèche with wooden louvred bell-openings on each face. Above these are lucarnes, a lead finial and a weathercock.

=== Interior ===
The interior of the church is brick and terracotta throughout. In the chancel is a three-seat sedilia with a lancet above each seat. The reredos is by Jabez Thompson, and depicts the Last Supper in terracotta. The stained glass includes a mid-20th century window by Trena Cox. The authors of the Buildings of England series consider that the east window is over-large, but that it is also "very successful".

== External features ==
The lychgate is dated 1882 and is listed at Grade II. It consists of open timber framing and a hipped Lakeland slate roof. The churchyard contains two neighbouring war graves of a soldier and an airman of World War II.

== See also ==
- Listed buildings in Little Leigh
- List of works by Edmund Kirby
