= St Joseph's Church, Stockport =

Church in Stockport, Greater Manchester, England

St Joseph's Church
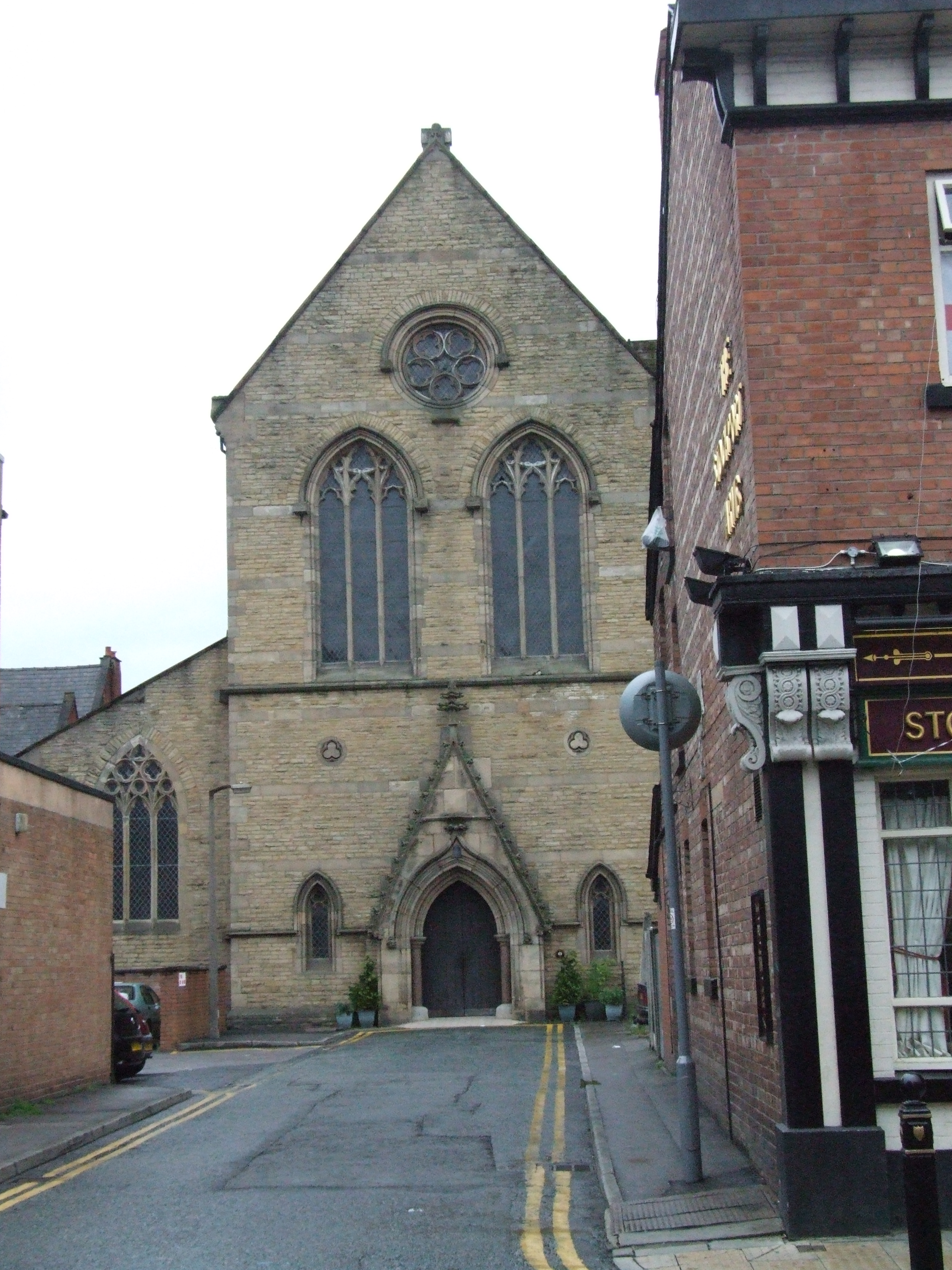
- View from St Petersgate in 2010
- St Joseph's Church
- 53.4095°N 2.1578°W
- OS grid reference: SJ 89609 90315
- Location: Stockport, Greater Manchester
- Country: England
- Denomination: Roman Catholic
- Website: St Joseph's, Stockport

History
- Status: Active
- Dedication: Saint Joseph

Architecture
- Functional status: Parish church
- Heritage designation: Grade II
- Designated: 16 September 1985
- Architect: Matthew Ellison Hadfield
- Style: Gothic Revival
- Groundbreaking: 1861
- Completed: 1862

Administration
- Province: Birmingham
- Diocese: Shrewsbury
- Deanery: Stockport and Tameside

St Joseph's Church is a Roman Catholic parish church in Stockport, Greater Manchester, England. It was built from 1861 to 1862 and designed by Matthew Ellison Hadfield. It is situated on St Petersgate, south west of the High Street. Until 31 August 2022 it was the only church in England administered by the Priests of the Sacred Heart at which date it was transferred to be designated as Eucharistic Shrine for the Diocese of Shrewsbury. As part of this change, times for Eucharistic adoration have been made available in addition to the continued life of the parish. The church building is Grade II listed building.

== History ==
=== Foundation ===
During the late 18th century, the local Catholic population in Stockport were served by priests from Manchester. In 1798, a Fr James Blundell was saying Mass in a house on Windmill Street. In 1803, a permanent chapel was built on Chapel Street and called St Philip and St James. In the first half of the 19th century, the Catholic congregation increased with the influx of workers at Stockport’s mills. In 1845, a priest would come from the chapel (which in 1905 would be replaced by Our Lady and the Apostles Church in Edgeley) to the centre of Stockport to say Mass in a temporary school in Parson’s Yard. In 1858, the schools on Tatton Street were built. They were designed by Matthew Ellison Hadfield and George Goldie.

=== Construction ===
In 1861, the foundation stone for the church was laid by the Bishop of Salford, William Turner. In 1862, a watercolour was made by Matthew Ellison Hadfield showing the west end interior of the church. It now hangs in the west end of the nave. In 1888, an industrial school, linked to the church, was built to the south of the school. It was part-funded by the Henry Fitzalan-Howard, 15th Duke of Norfolk.

== Parish ==
The church has three Sunday Masses: a 5:00pm Saturday vigil, a 9:00am mass with children's liturgy, and 11:30am with Gregorian chant. There is weekday Eucharistic Adoration from 7am-9pm and midday mass preceded by confessions from Monday to Friday.

== Interior ==
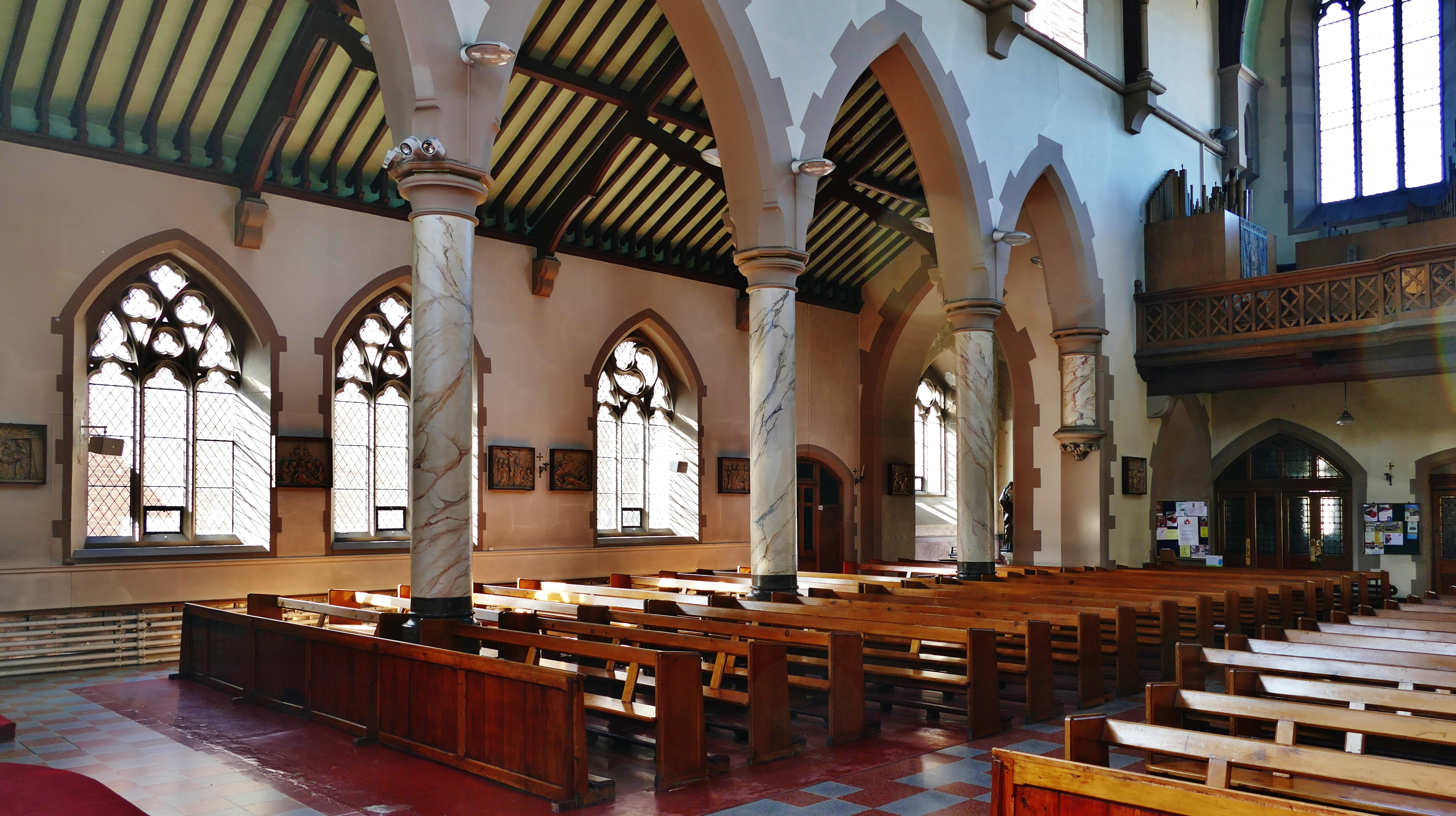
Interior

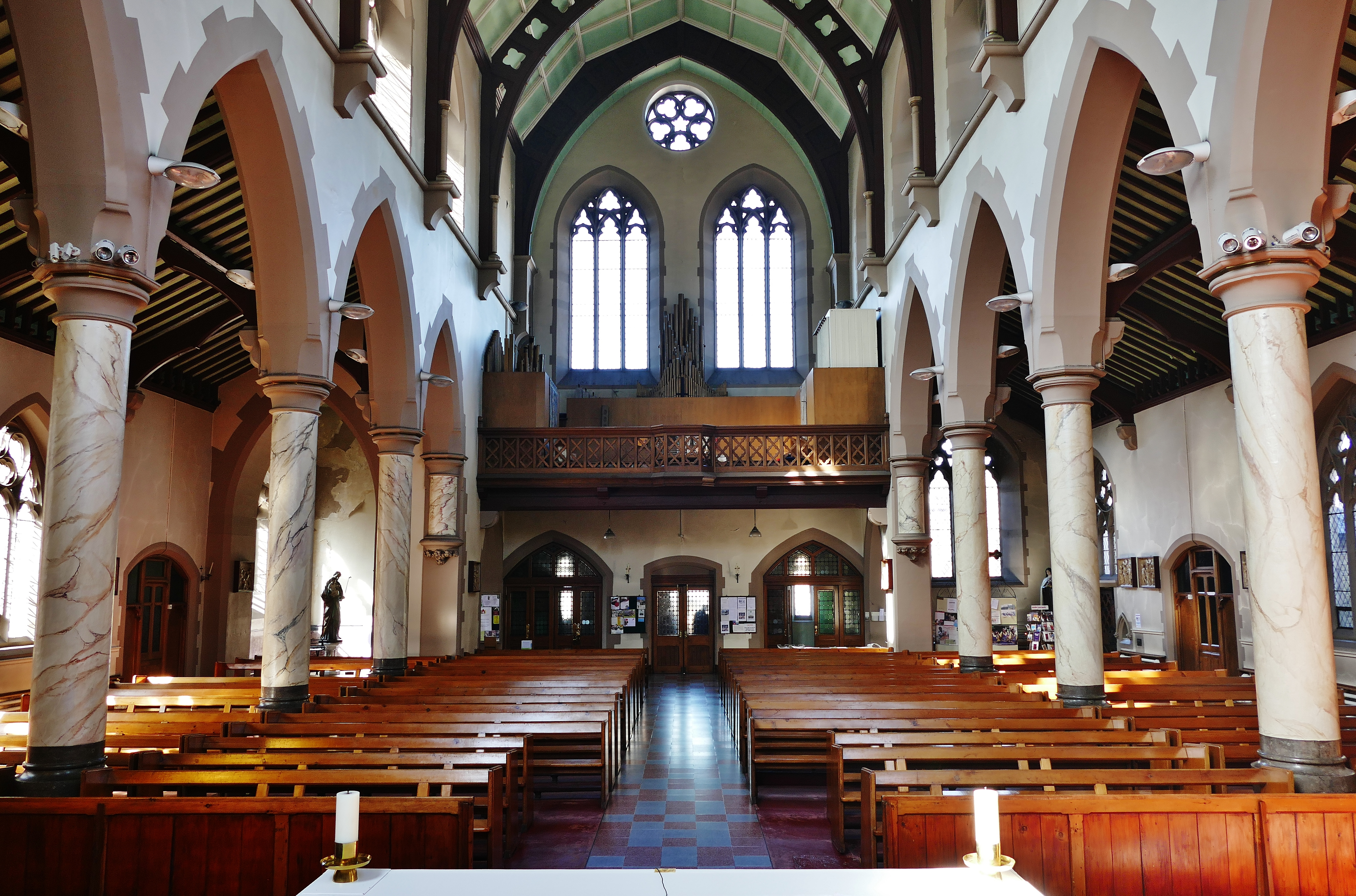
Pipe organ

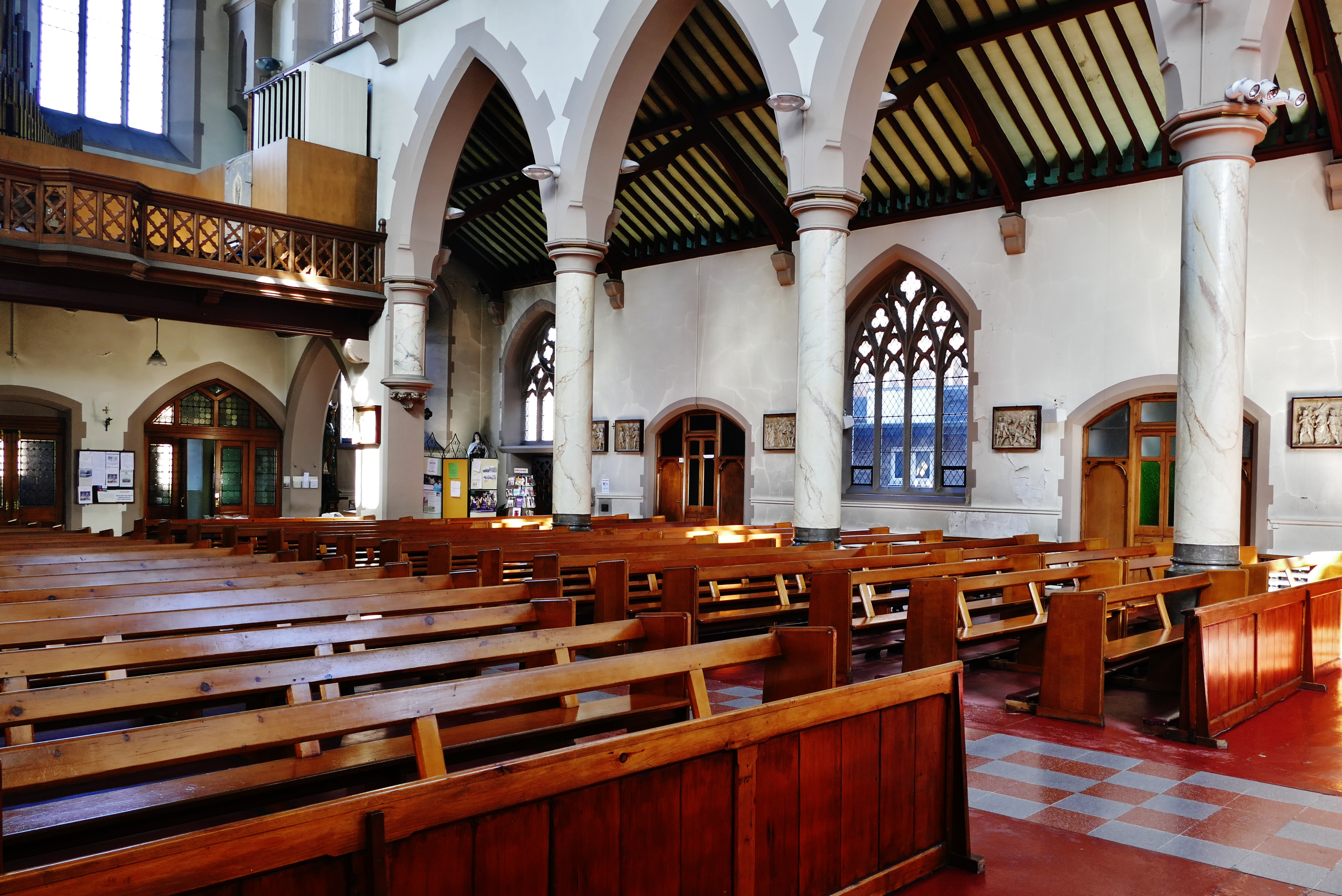
Confessional

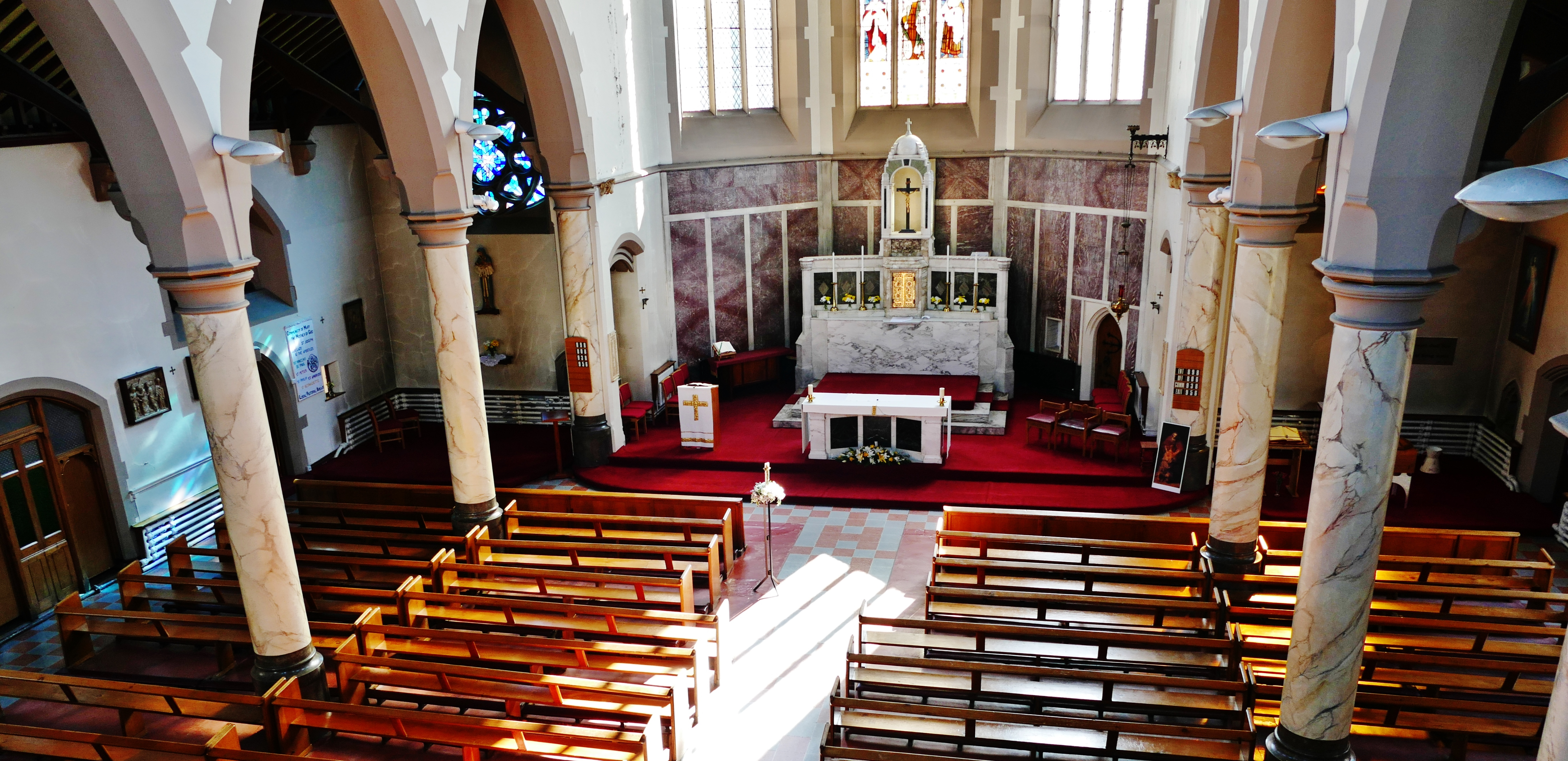
Altar

== See also ==
- Listed buildings in Stockport
- Diocese of Shrewsbury
- Dehonians
- List of churches in Greater Manchester
