= Barclays Bank, York =

Listed building in York, England

Barclays Bank
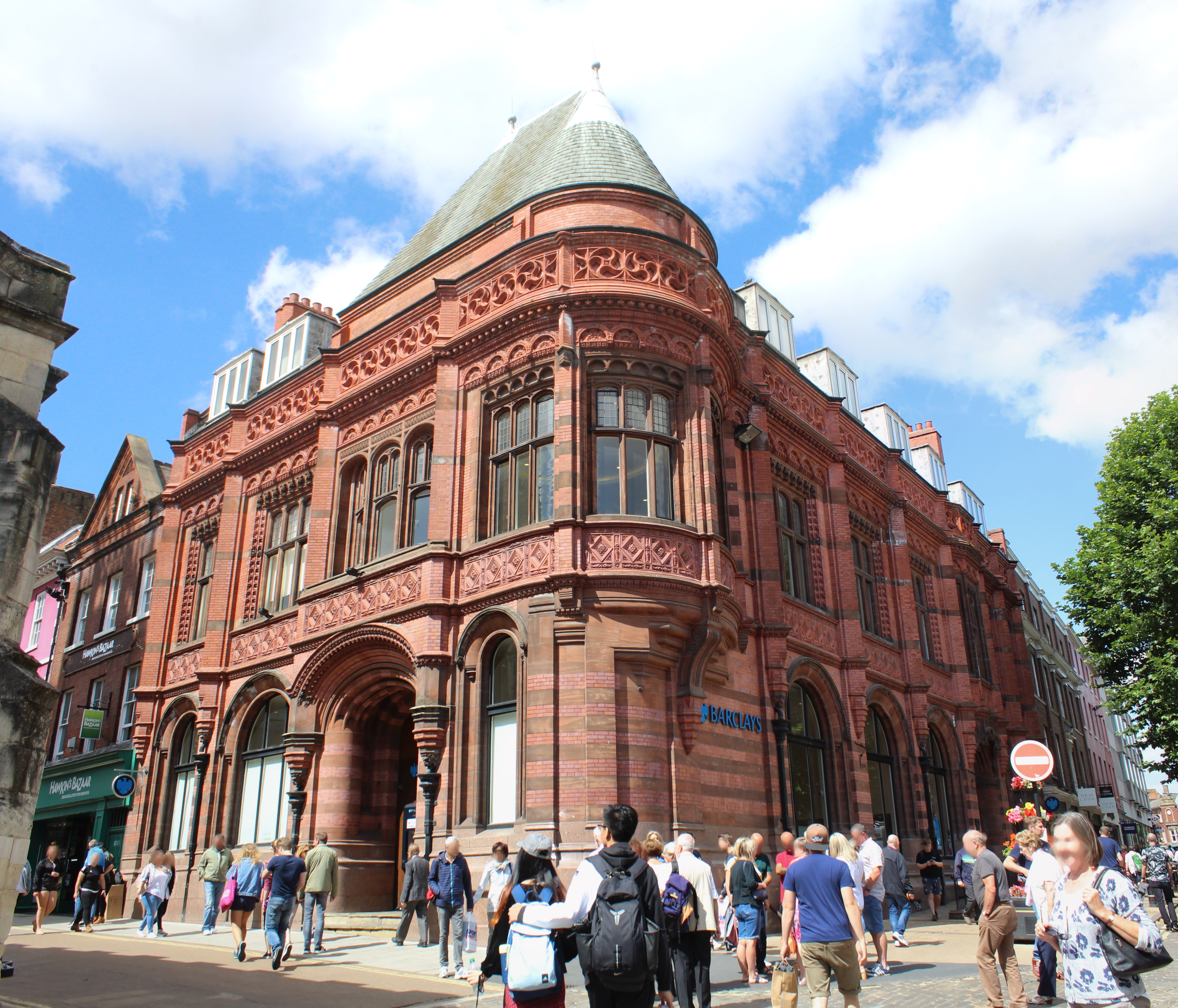
- The building in 2018
- Interactive map of the Barclays Bank area

General information
- Location: 1–3 Parliament Street, York, England
- Coordinates: 53.9584°N 1.0807°W
- Year built: 1901

Technical details
- Floor count: 2 + attic

Design and construction
- Architect: Edmund Kirby
- Designations

Listed Building – Grade II
- Official name: Barclays Bank
- Designated: 13 October 1975
- Reference no.: 1257027

Barclays Bank is a historic building on Parliament Street in the city centre of York, England.

The York Union Bank opened its head office on the site in the 19th century, and by the end of the century wanted larger premises. It commissioned Edmund Kirby to design a new building for the site on the corner of Parliament Street and High Ousegate, which was constructed in 1901. In 1902, the York Union became part of Barclays Bank, which maintained the branch, with offices above. Nikolaus Pevsner describes the building as being "very red and Waterhousish", and being "Gothic to early Renaissance" in style. The roof line has been altered, but the building was Grade II listed in 1975.

The two-storey building is constructed of red brick on a granite plinth, and has bands of terracotta and moulded brick, and a slate roof with dormer windows. It has seven bays to Parliament Street and four facing Ousegate. The ground floor has large windows with round heads, while the first floor has its windows divided by pilasters, set diagonally. There are entrances on each front, set off centre, the one to Parliament Street having an oriel window above. There are friezes depicting carp, chrysanthemums, and half sunflowers, while other mouldings show Tudor roses, foliage and lions' faces.

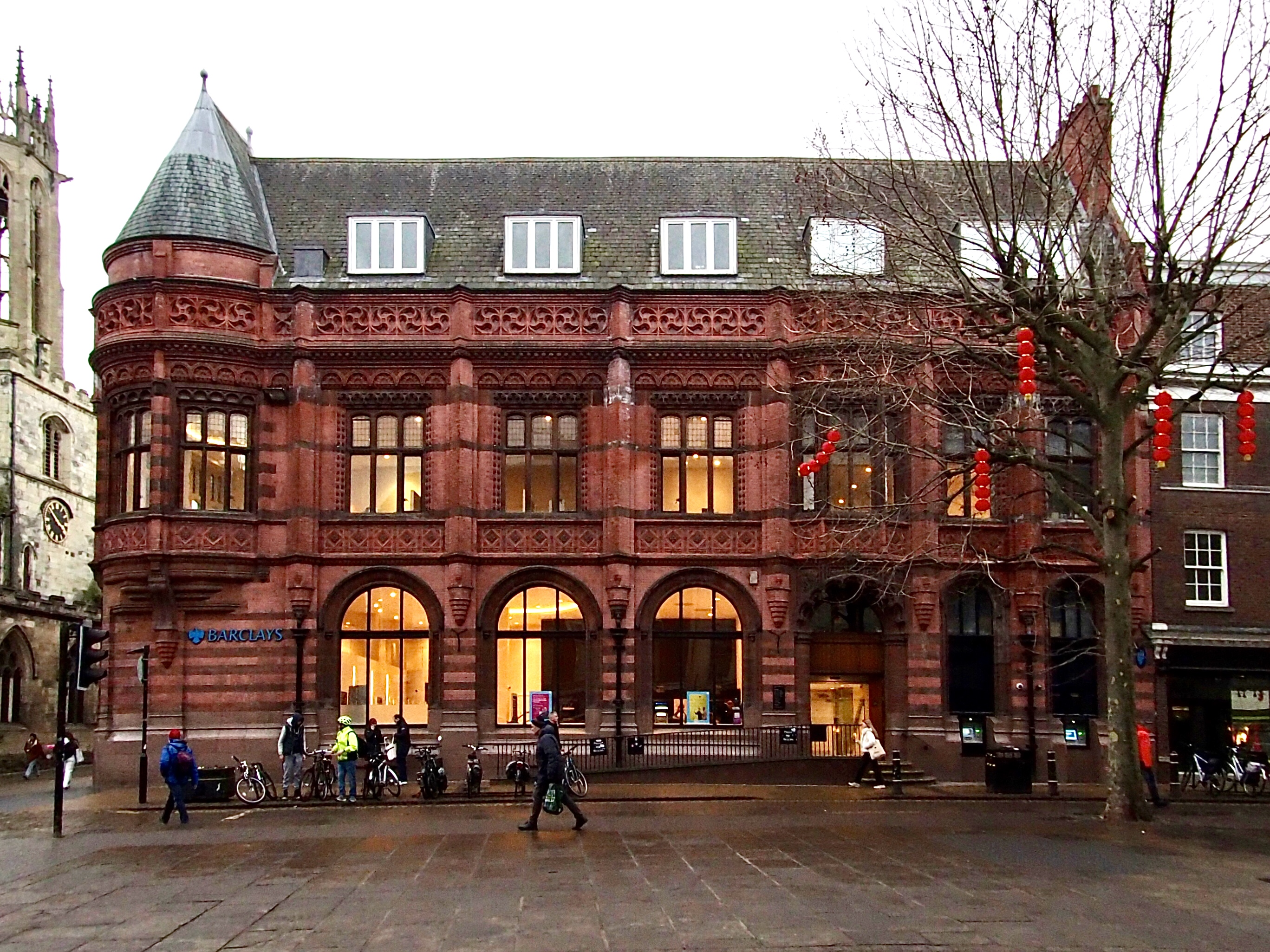
Parliament Street facade in 2023

== See also ==
- Listed buildings in York (within the city walls, northern part)
