= Little Leigh =

Village in Cheshire, England

Coordinates: 53.279°N 2.575°W

- The River Weaver at Little Leigh

- Location within Cheshire
- OS grid reference: SJ617759
- Civil parish: Little Leigh
- Unitary authority: Cheshire West and Chester
- Ceremonial county: Cheshire
- Region: North West
- Country: England
- Sovereign state: United Kingdom
- Post town: NORTHWICH
- Postcode district: CW8
- Dialling code: 01606
- Police: Cheshire
- Fire: Cheshire
- Ambulance: North West
- UK Parliament: Tatton

Little Leigh (formerly Leigh-juxta-Bartington) is a civil parish and village within the unitary authority of Cheshire West and Chester and the ceremonial county of Cheshire, England. It is situated on high ground on the north bank of the River Weaver; it is approximately 2 miles north of Weaverham on the A533 road and about three miles north-west of Northwich. The population of the civil parish taken at the 2011 census was 567.

== History ==
The village appears in Domesday Book as "Lege"; there were only five households and the manor was held by William fitz Nigel of Halton. Originally in the parish of Great Budworth, an ancient chapel of ease in Little Leigh was fully rebuilt in 1712 and was described as "a mean building of brick, standing defenceless in the highway". The chapel was replaced in 1879 by St Michael & All Angels Church, when Little Leigh became a separate parish. The salary for a schoolmaster had been paid from a bequest since 1728; classes were held in the west end of the chapel until a National School was built in 1840. A Baptist chapel was built in 1829. It contains a plaque commemorating an early minister, the Reverend Thomas Fownes Smith (1802–1866), who is said to have been the inspiration for the well-known folk song "The Farmer's Boy". In 1872, there was a population of 914 living in 179 houses.

Below are transcripts of documents found in Northwich Library:

=== LEGH-juxta-BARTERTON, vulgo LITTLE LEGH (1666) ===
The township of Little-Legh was held by William Fitz-Nigell baron of Halton in the time of the Conqueror, as appears by Doomsday-book.

Simon Fitz-Osbern, being possed of this village about the reign of king John grants the same unto Hugh Dutton, son of Hugh Dutton of Dutton, and to his heirs; silicet, totam villam de Leia in feu-firma: reddendo annuatim dua marcas argenti ad festum sancti Martini; [paying annually two silver marks at the festival of St. Martin] which rent is paid by the heirs of Dutton at this day, 1666, as to the manor of Harden-castle. Roger, constable of Cheshire, and Baron of Halton, acquitteth Hugh Dutton of Dutton de judice de Legha in hundredo meo de Halton; (id est) of the judger of Legh in his hundred of Halton, about anno Domini 1200. To be judger of a town, was to serve at the lord's court on the jury for such a town; whereof Dutton was discharged for Little-Legh by this deed. The hamlet of Clatterwig in Little-Legh was purchased by sir Thomas Dutton of Dutton, from Hugh de Clatterwig, in the reign of Henry the Third. This township hath ever since remained to the heirs of Dutton, even to this day, 1666, and is £25. 18s of an old rent.

In this township is an ancient chappel of ease, called Little-Legh chappel, within the parish of Great-Budworth. It was later repaired by the inhabitants of Little-Legh, anno Domini 1664, whereunto five pounds was given towards the repair thereof, by the parishioners of Great Budworth, me praesente.*

=== Additions (probably from Leycester) ===
This is a Chapel of Ease for Legh, Barnton, Bartington, and Dutton. In 1718, it was completely rebuilt, and has been augmented by Queen Anne's bounty. The Minister is appointed by the Vicar of Budwoth. A School has always been held in the Chapel, but the Master's Salary, which arises from interest of money left by a person unknown [actually Ralph Horton's will of 1728 – see below], is only forty shillings per annum. The Chapel is a mean building of brick, standing defenceless in the highway. A board is displayed inside St Michael's & All Angels, on the south wall near the door, with the details of this will.

=== Little Leigh [Leigh-juxta-Bartington] 1850 ===
LEIGH, (LITTLE) or LEIGH-JUXTA-BARTINGTON, is a chapelry township and pleasant village, 3 ¼ miles North West by West from Northwich, and 8 miles South from Warrington. The township contains 1,529 Acres, 2 roods, and 10 pecks of land. In 1841 there were 67 houses, and 387 inhabitants. Population, in 1801, 380; in 1831, 381. Rateable value, £3,003, of which the North Staffordshire Canal, which intersects the township for about a mile and three-quarters, is rated at £800.

The village is pleasantly situated on high ground, commanding extensive views of the surrounding country. Lord Leigh is lord of the manor and owner of about four fifths of the township. There are about 30 acres of glebe land in the township.

Little Leigh appears, from the Domesday survey, to have been included in the possessions of the Barons of Halton. About the reign of King John, Simon Fitz-Osborne purchased the manor, which was subsequently granted, with other estates, to Hugh Dutton and his heirs, paying annually two silver marks at the festival of St. Martin. It afterwards descended to the Gerards and the Fleetwoods, and was purchased of the latter by the Leighs, of Stoneley, in Warwickshire, in whom it continued vested until the decease of Edward lord Leigh in 1786, It has since passed with other Stoneley estates, under the will of lord Leigh, to the Leighs of Adlestrop in Gloucestershire, and is now vested in [the representative of] that family, [Lord Leigh of Stoneleigh Abbey].

The Chapel of Ease, a small brick fabric, was rebuilt in 1718. The living is a perpetual curacy, returned in the King's book, at £65. 10s., which has been augmented with £200 benefactions, and £800 Queen Ann's Bounty. Patron: vicar of Great Budworth. Incumbent: Rev. William Whitworth, who resides at the parsonage, built in 1717, and situate on the north side of the Chapel. The chapelry embraces Little Leigh, Bartington, and Dutton. The small tithes are commuted for £10, the rectorial for £120, and £1. 10s. to the impropriator.

The National School is a neat brick building, erected in 1840, a little south from the Chapel, contiguous to which the residence for the teacher, which has been provided by Lord Leigh, who gave, also, the site of the School. About 70 children attend the School, which is supported by subscriptions, charitable bequests, and the pence of the children. The Baptists have a small chapel in the township, under the pastoral care of Mr Thomas Smith.

Charities: The interest of a sum of £60, supposed to have been given by Mr Barker and others, amounting to £3 per annum, is distributed in the sums of £2. 11s. to the poor, and 9s. to the schoolmaster.

Ralph Horton, by Will, in 1728, bequeathed £20, the interest to be paid yearly to the schoolmaster of Little Leigh. The sum of £43 has also been given for a similar purpose. This sum was in the hands of Edward Barker, when the Charity Commissioners published their Report, but owing to some remissness on the part of the parish in claiming it of his executors after his death, no interest was paid for several years. After an investigation of the circumstances, it was proposed to pay over these gifts to the trustees on behalf of the school.

John Done charged his estate in Hedge Lane, in the township of Weaverham, with the annual payment of 16s. to purchase wine for the sacrament. No payment has been made for some time, but on representation of the case to the owner of the estate, he undertook to pay the money for the future.

=== Additions (approx 1860) ===
The township is situated on high ground on the north bank of the Weever, about three miles north-west from Northwich. The village is a collection of inconsiderable farm-houses, amongst which the chapel is situate. It is a mean building of brick, standing in the highway, without any yard or fence round it. The west end is used as a school. [Preparations are now being made by the present incumbent, the Rev George Willett, for the erection of a church, the corner stone of which has been recently laid. A school was built here in 1840.]

=== Ralf Horton's Will ===
Ralph Horton's will was seemingly of some importance to the villagers. It is replicated on a board in St Michael's & All Angels, and a copy exists at Shakespeare Birthplace Trust archives in Stratford upon Avon. The records for Lord Leigh of Stoneleigh, Warwickshire are held there, and hence much information about the village. The following extracts are taken from other records at the Shakespeare Birthplace Trust. It could be inferred from other records that the significance of Ralph's will with the villagers was due to his efforts in rebuilding the chapel in 1718.

12 August 1728: copies of the will of Ralph Horton, Little Leigh, Cheshire, Tailor. Bequeaths house and lands in Little Leigh in occupation of self and Kinsman Ralph Nickson, carpenter, to Francis Wrench, Barnton, Cheshire on trust to use rents and profits to pay preaching minister at Little Leigh chapel, which minister to be chosen by Wrench and inhabitants of Little Leigh. Condition of bequest is that Wrench pay £400 in bequests, made up from £100 given by Sir Robert Cotton, Bart, for a minister at Little Leigh: £100 subscription now collecting to qualify for Queen Anne's Bounty of £200: Bequests £200 to brother John Horton, £20 at interest which to be paid to grammar school master at Little Leigh: £20 to Tailors guild: £20 to poor of Great Budworth, £10 to Ester Worral; £10 to Randle Pierson: £10 at interest to be paid to poor of Little Leigh not in receipt of any other relief: £10 to poor of Barnton: £100 at interest for preaching minister at Little Leigh.

17 June 1782: Letter signed by 19 parishioners of Little Leigh, to Rev. Joseph Eaton, Vicar of Great Budworth, asking that he support choice of Rev. Mr [Joseph] Walcam as minister at Little Leigh when imminent death of Mr. Jones occurs.

29 August 1782: John Horton, Little Leigh to Joseph Hill, Chancery Office, London: Asks for help in complaint of inhabitants of Little Leigh: Vicar of Great Budworth has appointed curate at Little Leigh against wishes of inhabitants and terms of Ralph Horton's will. Inhabitants entered caveat at Chester but Mr. Jeffs (the other appete) has broken into chapel but refuses to reside or serve.

1838: Draft and copy Memorial from the inhabitants of Little Leigh to Right Rev. John Bird, Bishop of Chester, re will of Ralph Horton, appointment of Rev. Thomas Jeffs (late minister) and Rev. Ric Jones (present minister) by vicar of Great Budworth: sale of trust lands by Jones to Trent and Mersey Canal Company, Requesting intervention of Bishop.

== See also ==
- Sir Thomas Hayes

== Little Leigh Chapel ==
The following are transcripts from records at the Shakespeare Birthplace trust, available on www.a2a.org.uk.

The existing church was built in 1879, with plans by Edmund Kirby and Sons. Previously there was a chapel in the grounds of the existing churchyard, sited to the western end, near the small pedestrian gate.

19 October 1821: Memorandum of visit to Little Leigh chapel by Rev. George Henry Law, D.D, Bishop of Chester, and orders given then by him for: new prayer book, communion plate, new font, flagging of pews, appointment of chapel warden, incorporation of school into chapel and erection of new school.

10 May 1838: T.S. Newman, Northwich, Curate of Little Leigh to Chandos Leigh, Esq, Stoneleigh Abbey. Outlining proposal to build new chapel at Little Leigh, capable of holding 5–600 people from Little Leigh and Barnton.

20 August 1838: George Webber, Vicar of Great Budworth to Chandos Leigh, Stoneleigh Abbey: Is sure that if case for rebuilding chapel put fully to Leigh's tenants they will see value of scheme.

29 October 1838: Copy letter Chandos Leigh to Rev. Mr Newman, curate of Little Leigh: Is willing to contribute to repairs to present building but does not support enlargement to accommodate people of Barnton.

No date [after 1838]: Report [in handwriting of Hon. Julia Judith Leigh] re Messrs. Newman of Nantwich. The younger Mr. N (John) is a clergyman who hopes of appointment as curate of Little Leigh on death of Mr. Jones the present curate. Notes re Chapel of Little Leigh and proposed enlargement to which inhabitants are opposed.

The Baptist Church at Little Leigh where Thomas Fownes Smith preached. He is said to have been the original "Farmer's Boy"

== See also ==
- Listed buildings in Little Leigh
