= Edmund Kirby =

English architect

- Born: 8 April 1838; Liverpool, England
- Died: 24 April 1920 (aged 82); Birkenhead, England
- Occupation: Architect
- Known for: Roman Catholic Churches

Edmund Kirby (8 April 1838 – 24 April 1920) was an English architect. He was born in Liverpool, and educated at Oscott College in Birmingham. He was articled to E. W. Pugin in London, then became an assistant to John Douglas in Chester. He travelled abroad in France and Belgium, and had started to practise independently in Liverpool by 1867, initially having offices in Derby Buildings, Fenwick Street. Between 1880 and 1914, his offices were in Union Buildings, Cook Street, Liverpool. In 1905 Kirkby took his two sons, Francis Joseph and Edmund Bertram, into partnership. He retired in 1917, and died in 1920. His practice continued after his death, until it merged with Matthews and Goodman in 2011.

Most of Kirby's works were in Northwest England, with occasional examples in North Wales, Staffordshire, Shropshire, and elsewhere. He was an architect to the Roman Catholic Church, and most of his ecclesiastical works were for this denomination. His most notable work in this genre is the Sodality Chapel for St Francis Xavier's Church, Liverpool. In 1869 he designed Sacred Heart Church in Hindsford which Pevsner described as a "pretty church". His Anglican churches include St Michael and All Angels, Little Leigh, and St Cross, Appleton Thorn. He also designed and carried out work on commercial and domestic properties, including Dee House, Chester and 12 Hanover Street, Liverpool.

== See also ==
- List of works by Edmund Kirby
