= Runcorn Rural District =

Rural district in Cheshire, England

Coordinates: 53.335°N 2.729°W

Runcorn RD within Cheshire in 1970

Runcorn was a rural district in Cheshire, England from 1894 until 1974. It was named after but did not include Runcorn, a town on the River Mersey to the north-west of the district, which formed its own urban district.

The district was abolished in 1974 under the Local Government Act 1972. It was split between the new districts of Vale Royal, Warrington and Halton, with the parishes of Appleton, Grappenhall, Hatton, Stockton Heath, Stretton, and Walton going to Warrington; the parishes of Daresbury, Moore and Preston Brook going to Halton (with Runcorn town), and the rest going to Vale Royal (now Cheshire West and Chester). The council had its offices at Castle Park in Frodsham.

== Parishes ==
- Acton Grange (abolished in 1936 to form part of Walton)
- Alvanley
- Antrobus
- Appleton
- Aston (created in 1936)
- Aston-by-Sutton (abolished in 1936 to form part of Aston)
- Aston Grange (abolished in 1936 to form part of Aston)
- Bartington (abolished in 1936 to enlarge Dutton)
- Clifton (abolished in 1936 to enlarge Runcorn and Sutton)
- Crowley (abolished in 1936 to enlarge Antrobus)
- Daresbury
- Dutton
- Frodsham
- Frodsham Lordship (abolished in 1936 to enlarge Frodsham)
- Grappenhall
- Great Budworth
- Halton (abolished in 1967 to enlarge Runcorn)
- Hatton
- Helsby
- Higher Whitley (abolished in 1936 to form part of Whitley)
- Keckwick (abolished in 1936 to enlarge Daresbury)
- Kingsley
- Kingswood (abolished in 1936 to enlarge Kingsley, Manley and Norley)
- Lands common to Frodsham and Frodsham Lordship (Frodsham Lordship was abolished in 1936 to enlarge Frodsham)
- Latchford Without (abolished in 1936 to enlarge Stockton Heath)
- Lower Whitley (abolished in 1936 to form part of Whitley)
- Manley
- Moore
- Newton by Daresbury (abolished in 1936 to enlarge Daresbury)
- Newton by Frodsham (abolished in 1936 to enlarge Kingsley)
- Norley
- Norton (abolished in 1967 to enlarge Runcorn)
- Preston Brook
- Preston on the Hill (abolished in 1935 to enlarge Preston Brook)
- Seven Oaks (abolished in 1936 to enlarge Antrobus)
- Stockham (abolished in 1936 to enlarge Norton)
- Stockton Heath (created in 1897)
- Stretton
- Sutton
- Thelwall
- Walton (created in 1936)
- Walton Inferior (abolished in 1936 to form part of Walton)
- Walton Superior (abolished in 1936 to form part of Walton)
- Weston (abolished in 1936 to enlarge Runcorn)
- Whitley (created in 1936)
