= Listed buildings in Appleton, Cheshire =

Appleton is a civil parish in the Borough of Warrington, Cheshire, England. It contains 25 buildings that are recorded in the National Heritage List for England as designated listed buildings. The parish is partly residential, including the village of Appleton Thorn, and is otherwise mainly rural. The Bridgewater Canal runs along its northern border, the A49 road is to the west, and the M6 motorway is to the east. Most of the listed buildings are residential, are related to farming, or are associated with the canal and roads in the parish. The exceptions to this are the village church, a war memorial, an obelisk, and a Medieval cross base.

== Key ==
| Grade | Criteria |
|---|---|
| Grade II* | Particularly important buildings of more than special interest. |
| Grade II | Buildings of national importance and special interest. |

== Listed buildings ==
| Name and location | Photograph | Date | Notes | Grade |
|---|---|---|---|---|
| Cross base 53.34638°N 2.55427°W | | Medieval (probable) | A square stone with a recess for a cross standing on a square plinth of two sandstone steps. The cross is no longer present. | II |
| Farm building, Tanyard Farm; 53.3504°N 2.5162°W | — | Late 16th century | This originated as a threshing barn, cartshed and stable, which form an L-shaped plan. It is timber-framed, with brick nogging, and stands on a sandstone plinth. It is roofed with blue tiles. The timber framing includes four crucks, two of which are complete, the other two are sawn off near the top. | II* |
| Barleycastle Farmhouse; 53.3512°N 2.5192°W | — | 17th century (or earlier) | This is basically timber-framed, later pebbledashed, with a slate roof. It is in 1½ storeys with three bays. The windows are casements. Inside is an inglenook. | II |
| Laurel Cottage; 53.3459°N 2.5467°W | — | 17th century (or earlier) | A pair of cottages, probably originally one cottage. The building is timber-framed with brick nogging on a projecting sandstone plinth. The roof is thatched. It is in a single storey with attic bedrooms, and has five bays. The windows are casements. | II |
| School Farm Farmhouse; 53.3489°N 2.5468°W | — | 17th century (or earlier) | This originated as a timber-framed building, and was re-walled with brick about 1800. The roofs are slated. The house is in 1½ storeys, and it has an L-shaped plan, with three bays on the front elevation, and two on the side. The windows are small casements. Internally some original features remain, including an inglenook and large beams. | II |
| Yew Tree Farmhouse; 53.3514°N 2.5360°W | — | 17th century (or earlier) | This is basically a timber-framed building, and was cased in brick about 1800. There is some surviving timber framing, and the roofs are slated. The house is in two storeys, and it has an L-shaped plan, with four bays in the front wing, and two in the rear wing. The windows are casements. Internally some original features remain, including two inglenooks, and large beams. | II |
| Green Lane Farmhouse; 53.3517°N 2.5514°W | — | 1630 | Basically timber-framed, the farmhouse is rendered at the front, and the timber framing is exposed at the rear. The roofs are tiled. It is in 1½ storeys and has four bays. The windows are casements, with gabled dormers in the attics. Inside is an inglenook, later filled with a fireplace. | II |
| Daintith's Farmhouse; 53.3528°N 2.5958°W | | 17th century | The building has subsequently been altered. It is constructed in sandstone with a timber-framed gable, and brick extensions. The roofs are slated. It has an irregular plan, and is in two storeys. The windows are mullioned. | II |
| Shippon, Booths Farm; 53.3523°N 2.5309°W | — | 17th century | This is constructed in brick and timber framing with brick nogging. The roof is slated, and a small lean-to was added in the 20th century. The building contains a blocked door to the former threshing floor, and two other blocked openings. The windows are casements. | II |
| Wright's Green Cottage; 53.3562°N 2.5536°W | — | 17th century | A timber-framed cottage with brick nogging, and a red tiled roof. There is a pair of crucks in each gable and in an internal partition wall. The east gable wall is partly in sandstone. The cottage has 1½ storeys, and is in two bays. The windows are small casements. | II |
| Beehive Farmhouse; 53.3531°N 2.5328°W | — | 17th century (probable) | The farmhouse has a T-shaped plan. The front wing is timber-framed, probably incorporating crucks, on a brick plinth, and the rear wing, which probably dates from the 18th century, is in brick. The building has red tile roofs, and the left gable is rendered. The front wing has a single storey with attic bedrooms and is in three bays. The rear wing is in 1½ storeys, and was originally a shippon. The windows are casements, and one dormer. | II |
| Cross Cottages; 53.3463°N 2.5533°W | | 17th century (probable) | A pair of cottages, in rendered brick, painted to appear timber-framed. The roof is thatched. The cottages are in one storey with attic bedrooms, and have three bays. The windows are casements. Inside at least one of the cottages is an inglenook. | II |
| Booths Farm Farmhouse; 53.3521°N 2.5306°W | — | Late 17th century | This is constructed in rendered brick with sandstone dressings, and has a slate roof. It is in two storeys with attics, and has a symmetrical front. There is a central porch. In the lower two storeys are casement windows, and in the attic are gabled dormers. There is a similar two-storey rear wing. | II |
| Wright's Green House; 53.3563°N 2.5539°W | — | Late 17th century | The original parts of the building are timber-framed, the later parts, which were probably added in the 19th century, are in brick. The roof is tiled. The building is in 1½ storeys and two bays, with a single storey lean-to at the rear. The windows are mullioned. | II |
| Threshing barn, Daintith's Farm; 53.3530°N 2.5954°W | — | Late 17th century (probable) | The barn was altered in the 19th century. It is constructed in brick with a slate roof. The building is in two storeys, with a later single-storey extension. It contains 19th-century pitch holes. | II |
| Great Shepcroft Farmhouse; 53.3422°N 2.5839°W | — | 1731 | The farmhouse has subsequently been altered and extended. It is built in pebbledashed brick and has a slate roof. It is in 2½ storeys. The farmhouse has a central door, now blocked, carved with a white rose and an inscription. | II |
| Redlane Bridge; 53.3654°N 2.5878°W | | c. 1770 | A road bridge carrying Red Lane across the Bridgewater Canal; designed by James Brindley. It is constructed in brown brick with a sandstone band to the arch. | II |
| Canal warehouse 53.3671°N 2.5800°W | | Late 18th century (probable) | Standing on the south side of the Bridgewater Canal, the warehouse is constructed in brick, and has a corrugated asbestos roof. It is in four storeys with a symmetrical front. Features include loading doors, pitch holes, and windows. | II |
| Bridge Cottage; 53.3670°N 2.5794°W | | Early 19th century | Originating as a cottage, it was extended and converted into a house in about 1840. The whole building is constructed in brick with slate roofs. It is in two storeys with sash windows. The later part has a doorway in Doric style with a fanlight. | II |
| Wallcroft; 53.3659°N 2.5791°W | — | c. 1835 | This originated as a small single-storey cottage, symmetrical on all sides. During the 20th century an extension was added to the rear. It is constructed in brick with a pyramidal slate roof. The windows are sashes. | II |
| Obelisk; 53.35371°N 2.58132°W | | 1874 | A sandstone obelisk standing on a stepped base. On each side of the base is a panel containing a beast's head in low relief. At the four corners is a sculpture depicting a lion. The obelisk stands on the site of a former beacon. | II |
| St Cross Church; 53.3503°N 2.5456°W | | 1886 | The church was designed by Edmund Kirby, and paid for by Rowland Egerton-Warburton of Arley Hall. It is constructed in sandstone with a tiled roof. The church has a cruciform plan with a central tower. During the Second World War, the church had associations with a Royal Naval Air Service station, HMS Blackcap, which was located nearby. | II |
| Milestone; 53.35873°N 2.57769°W | | 1896 | A cast iron milepost on the east side of the A49 road. It carries the date, the name of Cheshire County Council, and the distance in miles to Stretton, Great Budworth, Northwich, Stockton Heath, and Warrington. | II |
| War Memorial; 53.35070°N 2.54598°W | | c. 1921 | A War Memorial to those who fell in the First World War, with an inscription for the Second World War added later. It consists of a sandstone fluted column on a stepped square plinth. Its capital is in the form of a dragon, and on the top is a Neo-Gothic tabernacle containing a statue of Saint George. Around the column is a paved area, steps and a low wall. | II |

== See also ==
- Listed buildings in Antrobus
- Listed buildings in Grappenhall and Thelwall
- Listed buildings in Hatton
- Listed buildings in High Legh
- Listed buildings in Lymm
- Listed buildings in Stockton Heath
- Listed buildings in Stretton
- Listed buildings in Walton
