= Listed buildings in Hatton, Warrington =

Hatton is a village and civil parish in the Borough of Warrington in Cheshire, England, located south of the town of Warrington. It contains three buildings that are recorded in the National Heritage List for England as designated listed buildings, all of which are at Grade II. This is the lowest of the three gradings given to listed buildings, applied to "buildings of national importance and special interest". The parish is entirely rural, and the listed buildings consist of a house, a public house, and a telephone kiosk.

Name and location	Photograph	Date	Notes
Hatton Hall; 53.3397°N 2.6053°W	—	17th century	The front was built in about 1830. The house is constructed in brick with slate roofs. The front is in three storeys, and the windows are sashes.
Hatton Arms; 53.3376°N 2.6040°W		Mid 17th century	This public house formerly incorporated a post office and a village store. It is constructed in brick with a slate roof, and has four brick chimneys on the ridge.
Telephone kiosk 53.33743°N 2.60391°W	—	1935	A K6 telephone kiosk designed by Giles Gilbert Scott. It is situated outside the Hatton Arms public house. The kiosk has a square plan, is constructed in cast iron and glass, and is painted red.

== See also ==
- Listed buildings in Appleton
- Listed buildings in Runcorn (rural area)
- Listed buildings in Stretton
- Listed buildings in Walton
- Listed buildings in Whitley
