= St John the Evangelist's Church, Warrington =

Church in England

Coordinates: 53.3626°N 2.6049°W

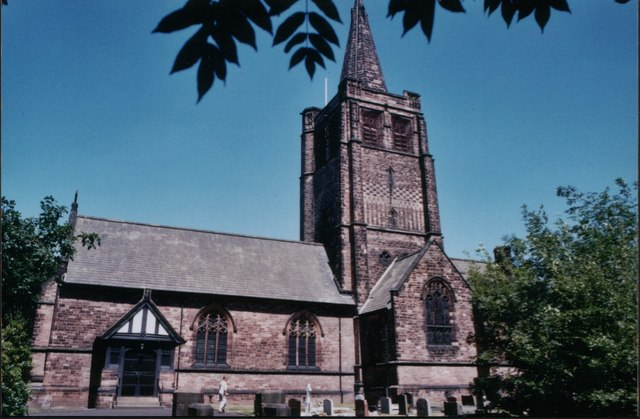
- St John the Evangelist's Church, Warrington

- Location in Cheshire
- OS grid reference: SJ 598,853
- Location: Walton, Warrington, Cheshire
- Country: England
- Denomination: Anglican
- Website: https://www.stjohnschurchwalton.org.uk

History
- Status: Parish church
- Dedication: John the Evangelist
- Consecrated: 1885

Architecture
- Functional status: Active
- Heritage designation: Grade II*
- Designated: 23 December 1983
- Architect: Paley and Austin
- Architectural type: Church
- Style: Gothic Revival
- Completed: 1885
- Construction cost: £17,500

Specifications
- Materials: Red sandstone with Westmorland green slate roofs

Administration
- Province: York
- Diocese: Chester
- Archdeaconry: Chester
- Deanery: Great Budworth
- Parish: St John the Evangelist, Walton

Clergy
- Priest: Revd Anita Raggett

St John the Evangelist's Church is in Walton, Warrington, Cheshire, England. It was built as a private estate church towards the end of the 19th century but is now an active Anglican parish church in the diocese of Chester, the archdeaconry of Chester and the deanery of Great Budworth. The church is recorded in the National Heritage List for England as a designated Grade II* listed building.

== History ==
The church was built in 1882–83 for the brewer Sir Gilbert Greenall of Walton Hall. It was designed by the Lancaster architects Paley and Austin, the cost of its construction being £17,500 (equivalent to £1,840,000 in 2025).

== Architecture ==
=== Exterior ===
The church is built in red snecked sandstone with Westmorland green slate roofs. Its plan is cruciform with a three-bay nave, north and south transepts, a two-bay chancel, a south vestry, and a south porch. The tower is in four stages with chequerwork in its third stage, a recessed octagonal spire and an octagonal north west stair turret. The porch consists of an oak frame on a 6 feet (2 m) sandstone plinth. The church is in Decorated style.

=== Interior ===
The nave and chancels have barrel roofs. On the south side of the chancel is sedilia. The reredos contains a carving of the Crucifixion. The font is marble, and the pulpit is built of oak on a stone base. The floors are tiled. The stained glass includes a window in the south transept dated 1929 by Morris and Co. and elsewhere by E. H. Jewitt of Shrigley and Hunt.

=== Appraisal ===
The church was listed at Grade II* on 23 December 1983. Grade II* is the middle of the three gradings designated by English Heritage, and is given to "particularly important buildings of more than special interest". The authors of the Buildings of England series describe it as a "glorious estate church, exquisitely detailed and composed", and consider that the tower is one of Austin's best.

== External features ==
The lych gate dating from around 1885 is built in red sandstone with a Westmorland green slate roof and half-timbered gables on brackets. It was built at the expense of Sir Gilbert Greenall and was designed by Paley and Austin. It is listed at Grade II.

== See also ==
- Grade I and II* listed buildings in Warrington
- Listed buildings in Walton, Cheshire
- List of ecclesiastical works by Paley and Austin
