= HM Prison Thorn Cross =

Prison in Cheshire, England

Coordinates: 53.3503°N 2.5407°W

HMP Thorn Cross
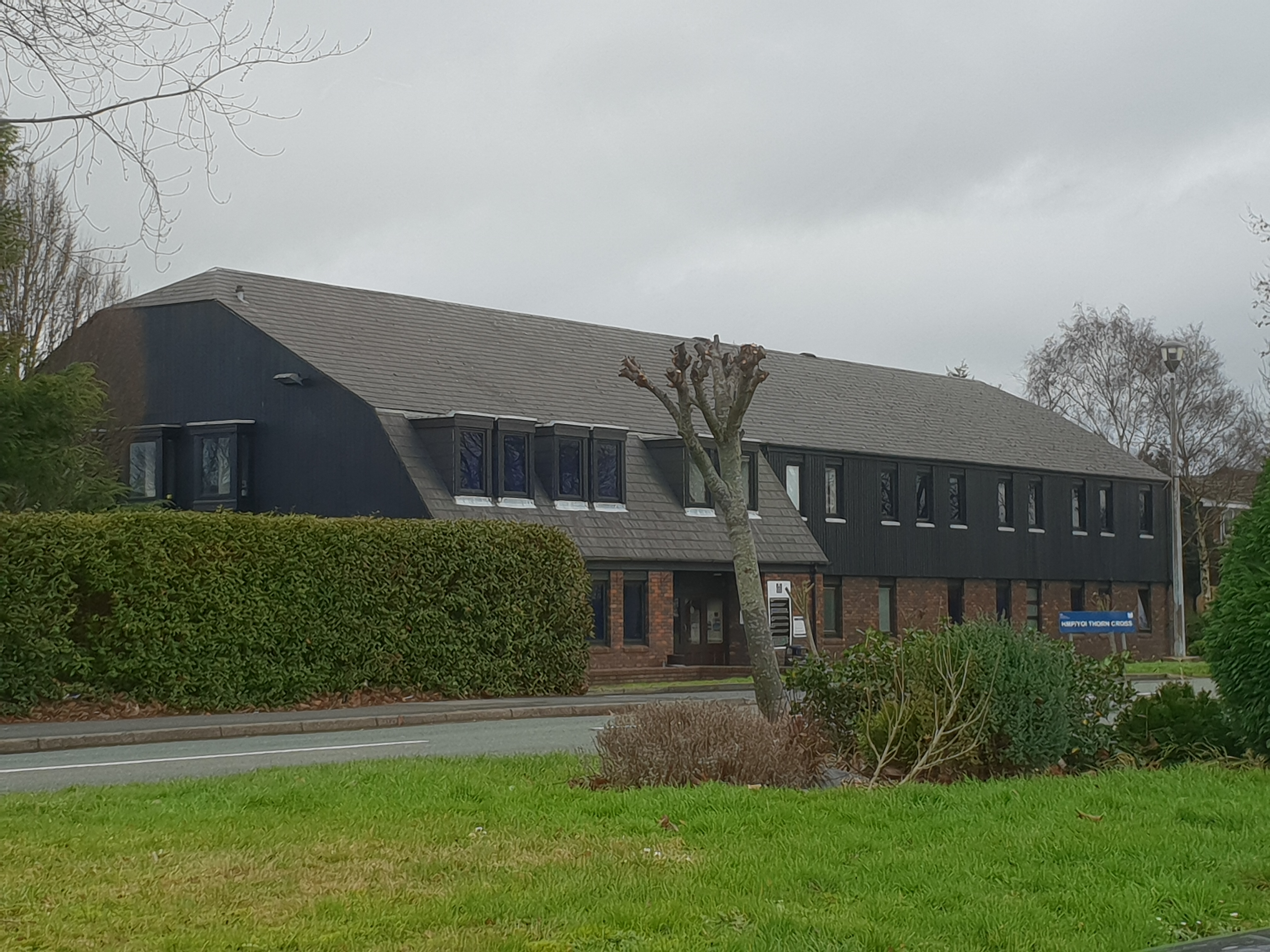
- Interactive map of HMP Thorn Cross
- Location: Appleton Thorn, Cheshire
- Security class: Adult Male Institution
- Population: 430 (June 2022)
- Opened: 1985
- Managed by: HM Prison Services
- Governor: Robert Durgan
- Website: Thorn Cross at justice.gov.uk

HM Prison Thorn Cross is a Category D Adult Male Institution for males; it previously was for young men aged 18–25. The prison is located in the village of Appleton Thorn, near Warrington in Cheshire, England. Thorn Cross is operated by His Majesty's Prison Service.

== History ==
Thorn Cross Prison opened in 1985, on the site of the former RNAS Stretton (HMS Blackcap) airfield. Thorn Cross was initially used as an open prison for adult males. In 1996, the prison was re-roled as a young offenders boot camp institution. At the time, Thorn Cross was the first such institution in the United Kingdom to enforce military-style disciplinary regime for some of its inmates, which led to a part of the prison (unit 5) being labelled a boot camp.

In January 1999, an inspection report from Her Majesty's Chief Inspector of Prisons labelled Thorn Cross Prison as an inspirational example of good practice. In particular the report praised the prison's High Intensity Training (HIT) project, and recommended it be rolled out to other prisons.

In October 2005, a further inspection report highly praised Thorn Cross Prison, again highlighting the prisons HIT programme. The report also noted that Thorn Cross managed to reduce re-offending amongst its ex-inmates to just over 20 per cent, one of the best rates in the country. The report added that the prison had to do more to improve relations with the local community however.

== Current status ==
HM Prison Thorn Cross is a Category D adult male institution for males aged 18+. Accommodation consists of single rooms, each prisoner having his own room key.

Education and training courses offered at the prison include construction crafts, horticulture, hospitality and catering and rail construction (NVQ level 2). Thorn Cross has a number of partnerships with national and local employers, offering opportunities for work placements prior to, and on release.

== Notable inmates ==
- Troy Deeney, former Watford footballer who served 16 weeks in prison for assault
- Kelvin Etuhu, the third prison the professional footballer was in during his eight-month sentence for assault
