= St Luke's Church, Lower Whitley =

Coordinates: 53.3054°N 2.5802°W

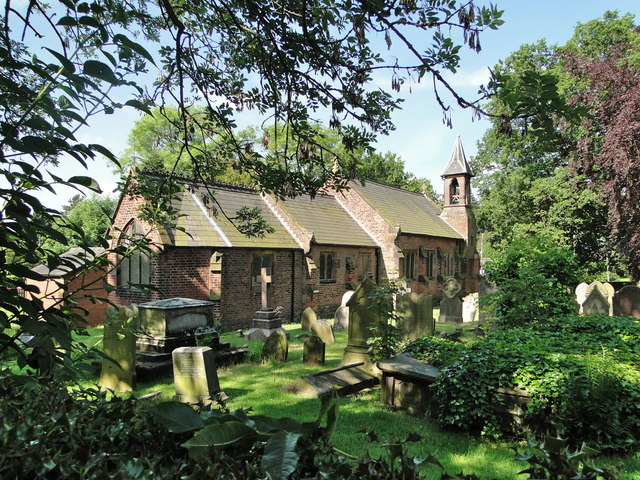
- St Luke's Church, Lower Whitley, from the northeast

- Location in Cheshire
- OS grid reference: SJ 614 789
- Location: Lower Whitley, Cheshire
- Country: England
- Denomination: Anglican
- Website: Parish of Aston-by-Sutton, Little Leigh & Lower Whitley

History
- Status: Parish church
- Dedication: St Luke

Architecture
- Functional status: Active
- Heritage designation: Grade II*
- Designated: 8 January 1970
- Architectural type: Church

Specifications
- Materials: Brown brick with sandstone dressings, grey slate roof Bell turret of stone with slate spire

Administration
- Province: York
- Diocese: Chester
- Archdeaconry: Chester
- Deanery: Great Budworth
- Parish: Lower Whitley

Clergy
- Vicar: Rev Dr Collette Jones

St Luke's Church is in the village of Lower Whitley, in the civil parish of Whitley, Cheshire, England. The church is recorded in the National Heritage List for England as a designated Grade II* listed building. It is an active Anglican parish church in the diocese of Chester, the archdeaconry of Chester and the deanery of Great Budworth. It is one of three parish churches in the parish of Aston-by-Sutton, Little Leigh and Lower Whitley. The other two being St Peter, Aston-by-Sutton and St Michael and All Angels, Little Leigh. The three were previously individual parishes in a united benefice with St Mark, Antrobus.

== History ==
The church on this site was originally a chapel of ease in the parish of Great Budworth. Its date of foundation is not known but in the later part of the 16th century it was in a "very ruinous condition" and was rebuilt on its original foundations by Thomas Touchet. Alterations were made during the 19th century, the major ones being in 1880 when the gallery was removed from the west end, a new organ was installed on the south side, a new pulpit was installed and the font was moved. During this time a polygonal apse was added at the east end.

== Architecture ==
=== Exterior ===
The church is built in brown brick with sandstone dressings; the roof is of grey slates. The plan consists of a west porch, a nave of four bays and a chancel of three bays. The sanctuary is a polygonal apse. At the northwest is a stone bell turret with a slate spire containing one bell.

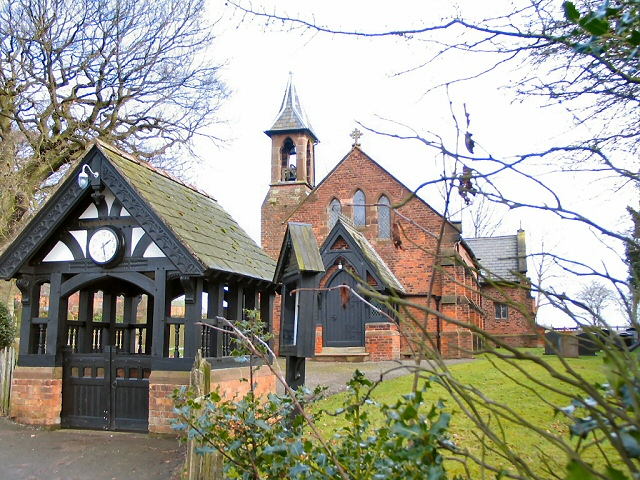
The Lych gate and its clock

=== Interior ===
The hammerbeam roof is intricately carved and is described as being "outstanding". The pews date originally from the 17th century; their ends have panels and ball finials. The stained glass dates probably from the 1860s, and is probably by Clayton and Bell. The two-manual organ was built around 1880 by Henry Willis and Company, with additions in 1907 by Rushworth and Dreaper, and alterations in 1950 by Kingsgate Davidson. The parish baptism registers begin in 1777.

== External features ==
In the churchyard is a sundial dating probably from the mid 18th century. It is listed at Grade II. The lychgate is a memorial to the First World War and incorporates a clock.

== See also ==
- Grade II* listed buildings in Cheshire West and Chester
- Listed buildings in Whitley, Cheshire
