= St Cross Church, Appleton Thorn =

Coordinates: 53.3503°N 2.5456°W

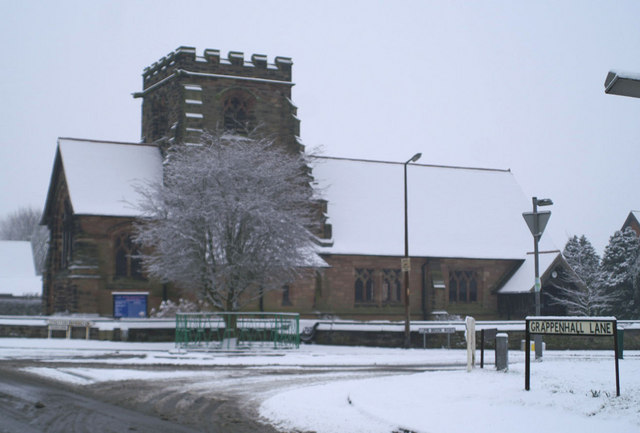
- St Cross Church, Appleton Thorn

- Location in Cheshire
- OS grid reference: SJ 638 838
- Location: Appleton Thorn, Warrington, Cheshire
- Country: England
- Denomination: Anglican

History
- Status: Parish church
- Dedication: Holy Cross

Architecture
- Functional status: Active
- Heritage designation: Grade II
- Designated: 23 December 1983
- Architect: Edmund Kirby
- Architectural type: Church
- Style: Gothic Revival
- Completed: 1886

Specifications
- Capacity: 100
- Materials: Red sandstone, red tile roof

Administration
- Province: York
- Diocese: Chester
- Archdeaconry: Chester
- Deanery: Great Budworth
- Parish: St Cross, Appleton Thorn

Clergy
- Vicar(s): The Revd Alan Jewell, MA (Oxon)

St Cross Church is in the village of Appleton Thorn, Cheshire, England. The church is recorded in the National Heritage List for England as a designated Grade II listed building. It is an active Anglican parish church in the diocese of Chester, the archdeaconry of Chester and the deanery of Great Budworth. Its benefice is combined with that of St Matthew's Church, Stretton.

== History ==
The church was built in 1886 to a design by Edmund Kirby at the expense of Rowland Egerton-Warburton of Arley Hall.

== Architecture ==
It is built in red sandstone with a red tile roof, in Decorated style. Its plan is cruciform with a two-stage tower over the crossing. It has a three-window nave without aisles, a one-window chancel, an oak-framed north porch on a sandstone plinth, and a baptistry projecting from the west end. Above the baptistry is a rose window. The stained glass in the east window is by Harcourt M. Doyle, dated 1970, and that in the rose window is by Celtic Studios of Swansea, dated 1986. The organ was built in 1906 at a cost of £220 (equivalent to £20,000 in 2025), by E. Wadsworth.

== External features ==
The churchyard contains six war graves of British service personnel, three from World War I and three from World War II.

== Connections ==
The church has connections with the Royal Naval Association because during the Second World War a Royal Naval Air Service station, HMS Blackcap, was in the village. Its ensign hangs in the church.

== See also ==
- Listed buildings in Appleton, Cheshire
- List of works by Edmund Kirby
