= Listed buildings in Whitley, Cheshire =

Whitley is a civil parish in Cheshire West and Chester, England. Apart from the settlements of Higher and Lower Whitley, the parish is entirely rural. It contains 16 buildings that are recorded in the National Heritage List for England as designated listed buildings. Most of these are houses, or buildings associated with farms. The other structures are a church with a sundial in the churchyard, a public house, a boundary stone, and the wall around a former burial ground.

== Key ==
Grade	Criteria
Grade II*	Particularly important buildings of more than special interest.
Grade II	Buildings of national importance and special interest.

== Buildings ==
Name and location	Photograph	Date	Notes	Grade
St Luke's Church; 53.3054°N 2.5802°W		Late 16th century (probable)	Rebuilt on the site of an earlier church, the roof was added in the 17th century, and the church was much restored during the 19th century. It is constructed in brick with sandstone dressings, and has a slate roof. At the east end is an apse, and at the northwest is a stone bell turret with a slate spire containing one bell.	II*
Town Pit Cottage and House; 53.3165°N 2.5746°W	—	Early 17th century	Originally timber-framed, these two attached cottages were encased in brick probably in the late 18th century. They are in two storeys, have slate roofs, and each has casement windows. There is brick diapering on the right cottage, and there are two dormers at the rear of the left cottage.	II
Marbury House Farmhouse; 53.3171°N 2.5689°W	—	17th century	This is basically a timber-framed house, later roughcast, with slate roofs. It has two storeys and attics. The windows are casements.	II
Greenhills Farmhouse; 53.3138°N 2.5958°W		Late 17th century	The rear wing was built in the late 17th century, followed by the front wing in 1876. The house is in two storeys, and constructed in brick with slate roofs. The rear wing stands on a stone plinth, and has stone quoins and mullioned windows. The front wing has sash windows and a canted bay window in the left gable-end.	II
Wall to former Friends' burial ground 53.3128°N 2.5774°W		Late 17th century (probable)	The wall consists of three courses of sandstone with a rounded coping surrounding a former Friends' burial ground. It is entered by a boarded gate between two square gateposts. Inside the enclosed area is an inscribed gravestone.	II
Barn, Greenhills Farm; 53.3134°N 2.5961°W	—	c. 1700	A threshing barn, constructed in brick with a slate roof, in two storeys. The central threshing porch is flanked by large buttresses. At the front is an oak porch, and at the right end are external steps. Near the apex of each gable is an owl hole.	II
Firtree Farmhouse; 53.3228°N 2.5565°W	—	1738	A three-storey brick house with a slate roof and a recessed two-storey extension on the right. The windows are sashes. Inside is a cellar with a barrel vaulted ceiling.	II
Towngate House; 53.3152°N 2.5740°W	—	1743	A brick house in two storeys standing on a painted stone plinth, with a slate roof, rusticated quoins, and stone bands. The windows are sashes. The attached sandstone and brick wall is included in the listing.	II
Sundial; 53.30555°N 2.5803°W	—	Mid-18th century (probable)	The sundial stands in St Luke's churchyard. It consists of a baluster on a square base in buff sandstone. It has a square stone cap, which has been renewed, but the dial and gnomon are not present.	II
The Thatched Cottage; 53.3033°N 2.5846°W	—	18th century (probable)	This originated as two cottages, later joined as one. The building has 1 1 1/2 storeys. It is constructed in white-painted brick with a thatched roof, a porch with a tiled roof, and a two-room projecting cross-wing. The windows are casements.	II
Chetwode Arms Inn; 53.3059°N 2.5799°W		c. 1800	A public house retaining some 17th-century fabric. It is constructed in brick with a slate roof, and is in two storeys. The windows are a mix of casements, sashes, and fixed windows. Inside there are some Georgian features.	II
Willow Bank Farmhouse; 53.3168°N 2.5731°W	—	c. 1820	A brick-built house in two storeys with a slate roof. The main door is flanked by attached Tuscan columns, and above it is a plain fanlight. The windows are recessed sashes.	II
Lodge, Willow Bank Farm; 53.31682°N 2.57331°W	—	Early 19th century	Built as lodgings for farm workers, later used as a farm building. It is constructed in brick with a slate roof. There are two storeys, with one room and one window in each storey.	II
Fogg's Farmhouse; 53.3236°N 2.5551°W	—	Early 19th century	A two-storey brick house with slate roofs, in two wings. The main doorcase is in Classical style, with a fanlight containing fleur de lys bars above it. The windows are 12-pane sashes.	II
Boundary stone 53.29888°N 2.58809°W	—	Early 19th century	The boundary stone is located to the north of the bridge crossing Whitley Brook. It is a rectangular block of sandstone, inscribed on its west face.	II
