= Higher Whitley =

Village in Cheshire, England

Coordinates: 53.316557°N 2.574406°W

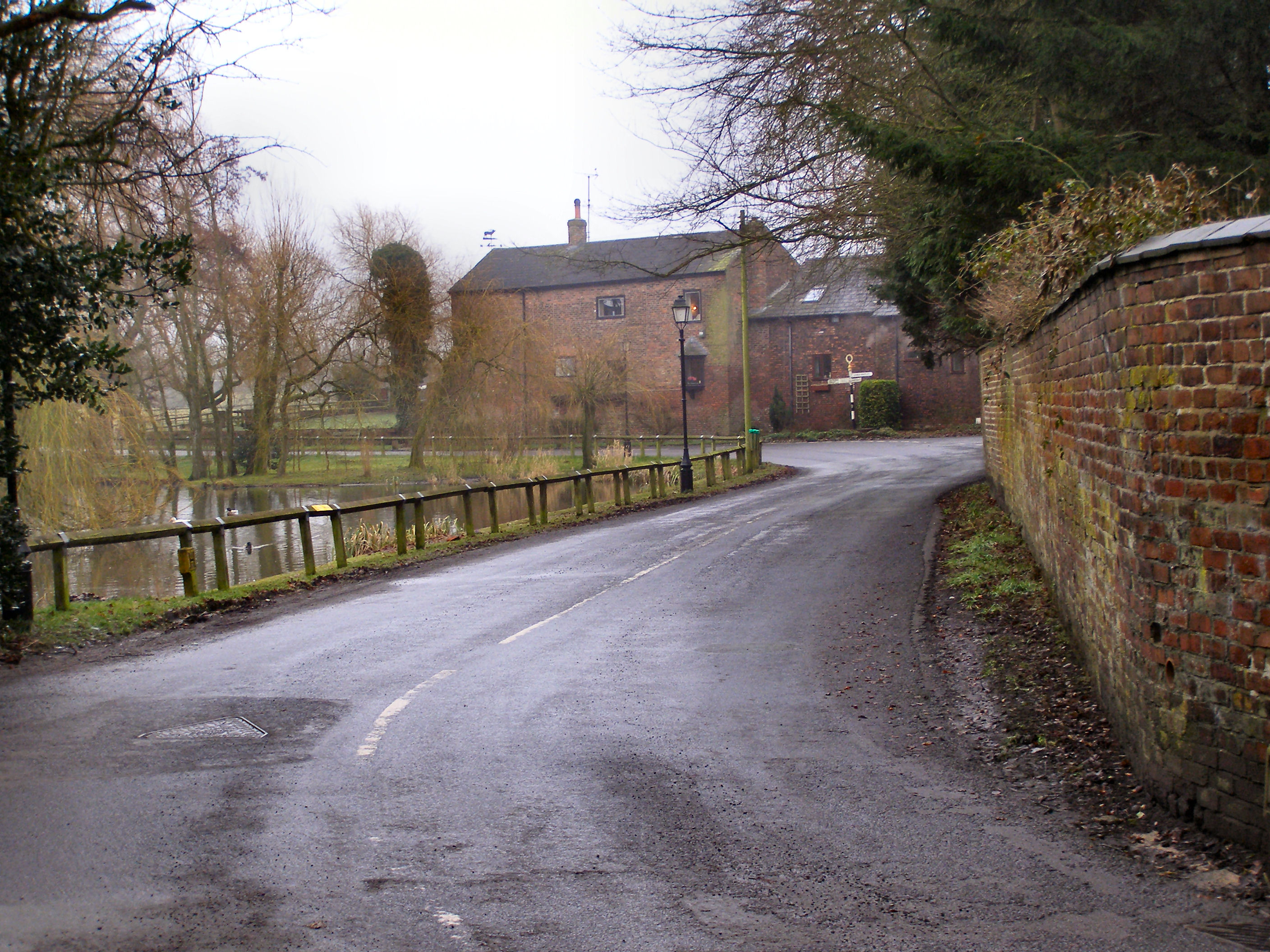

- Location within Cheshire
- Civil parish: Whitley
- Unitary authority: Cheshire West and Chester
- Ceremonial county: Cheshire
- Region: North West
- Country: England
- Sovereign state: United Kingdom

Higher Whitley is a village and former civil parish, now in the parish of Whitley, in the unitary authority area of Cheshire West and Chester, in the ceremonial county of Cheshire, England. In 1931 the parish had a population of 339. It is north of Lower Whitley.

== Governance ==
Whitley-Superior was formerly a township in the parish of Great Budsworth, in 1866 Higher Whitley became a civil parish, on 1 April 1936 the parish was abolished and merged with Lower Whitley to form "Whitley".
