= Walton Lea Walled Garden =

Coordinates: 53.3655°N 2.5995°W

Walton Lea Walled Garden is a walled garden in Warrington, Cheshire, England. The garden is owned by Warrington Borough Council and managed by the Walton Lea Project.

== History ==
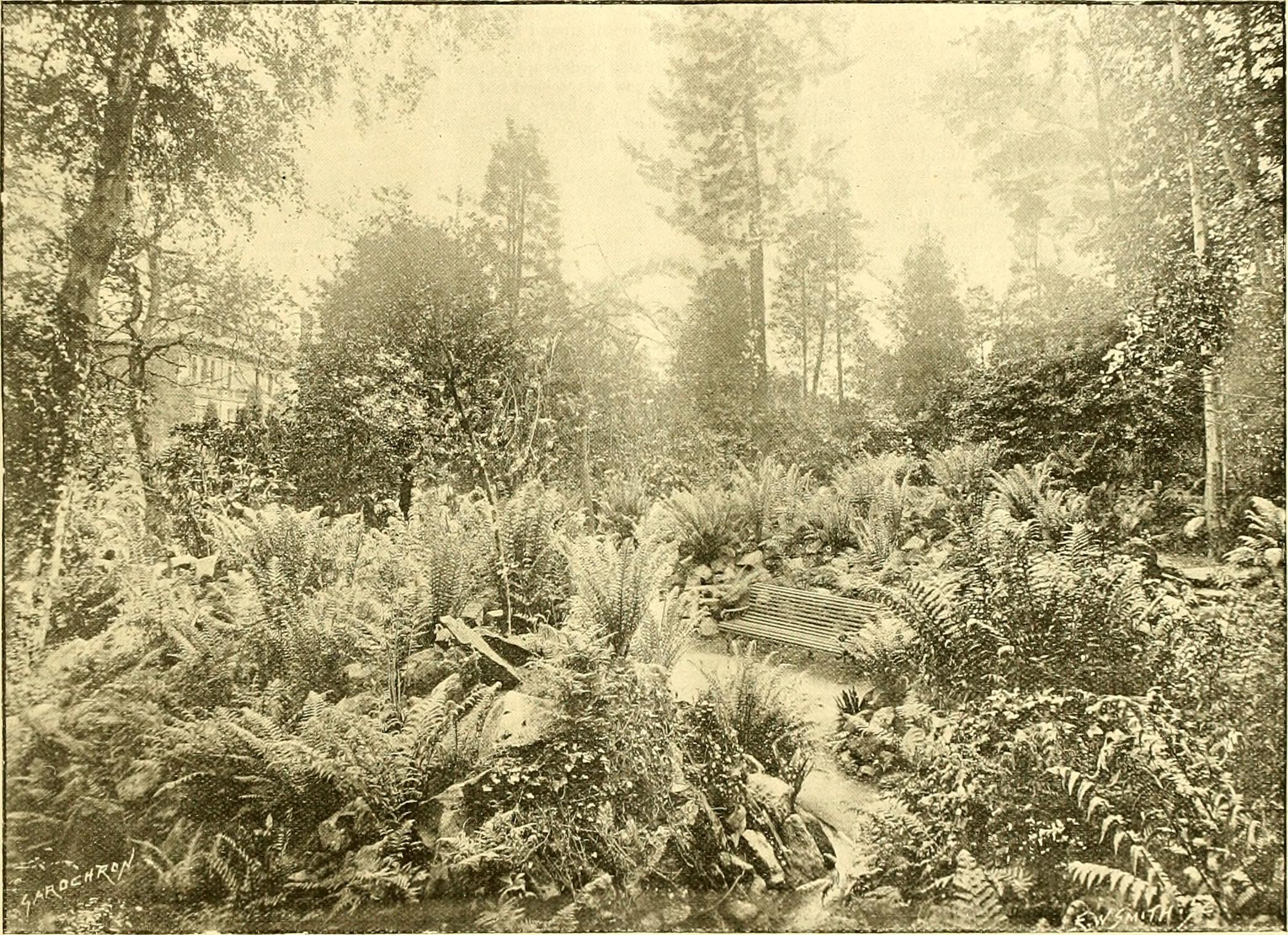
The fernery at Walton Lea circa 1874

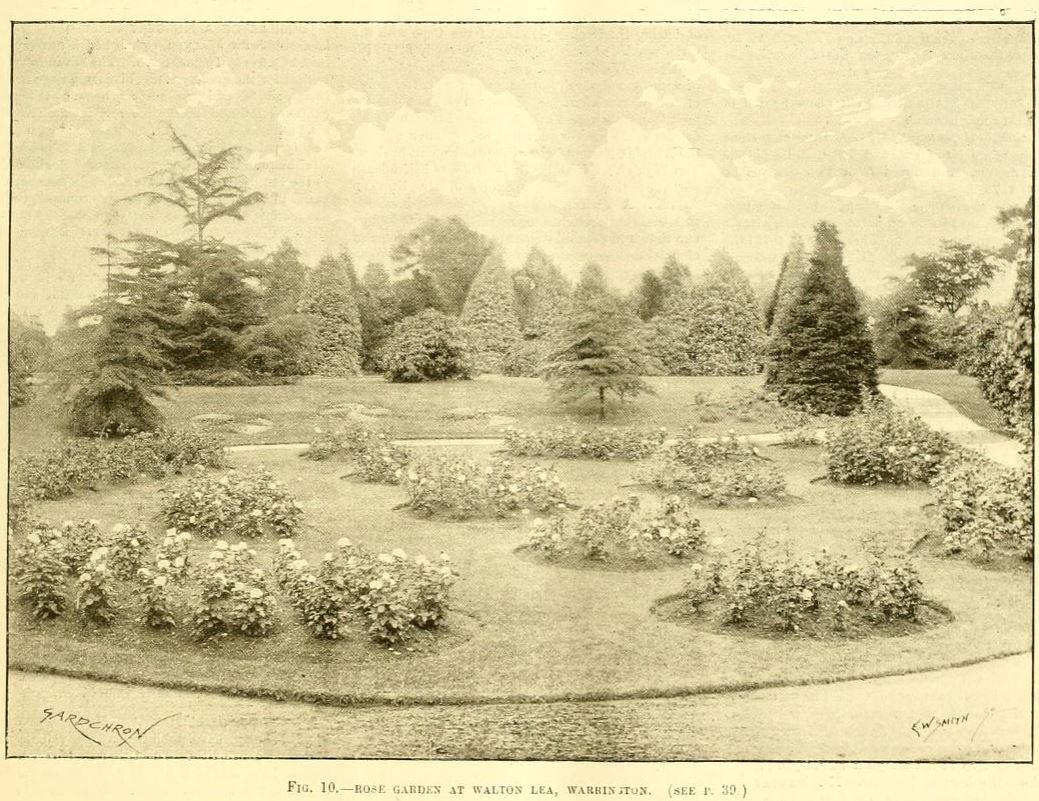
The rose garden at now demolished Walton Lea mansion

The garden was created circa 1864 as the kitchen garden to the Walton Lea mansion house. It was designed by Edward Walters and built by George Crosfield, the eldest son of soap manufacturing pioneer Joseph Crosfield. In the early 1900s the house was bought by the Armitage family. In 1923 it was bought by the Greenall family, owners of nearby Walton Hall. The Greenall and Crosfield families were political rivals and in 1925 the Greenalls demolished the mansion leaving only the garden, cottages and associated buildings. The estate also included a fernery and rose garden that are no longer in existence. The walled garden later passed to Warrington Borough Council. It is now managed by the Walton Lea project to benefit the community and people with disabilities.

== Description ==
The garden has an area of one acre with intact walls. The land slopes from the south-facing wall toward the north-facing wall.

== Facilities ==
The garden is open to the public daily. Fruit and vegetables from the garden are on sale. The garden provides work opportunities for people with disabilities.

== See also ==
- List of parks and open spaces in Cheshire

== Bibliography ==
- Musson, Albert E. (1965). Enterprise in soap and chemicals : Joseph Crosfield & Sons Ltd., 1815-1965 (1st ed.). Manchester University Press. OCLC 637210088.
