= Walton, Cheshire =

Civil parish in Cheshire, England

Coordinates: 53.3555°N 2.6085°W

Walton
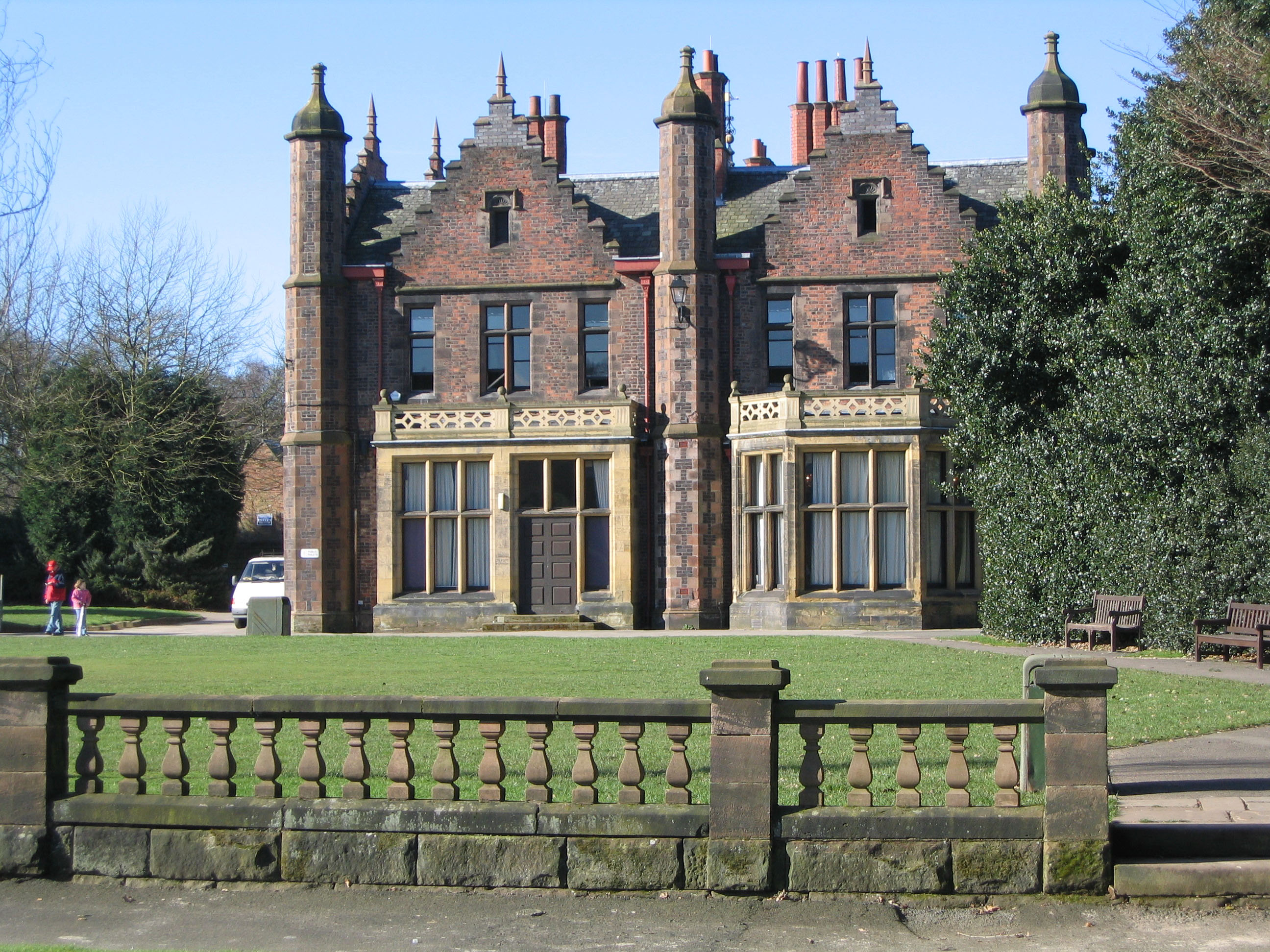
- Walton Hall

- Location within Cheshire
- Population: 1,594 (2001)
- OS grid reference: SJ5984
- Civil parish: Walton
- Unitary authority: Warrington
- Ceremonial county: Cheshire
- Region: North West
- Country: England
- Sovereign state: United Kingdom
- Post town: Warrington
- Postcode district: WA4
- Dialling code: 01925
- Police: Cheshire
- Fire: Cheshire
- Ambulance: North West
- UK Parliament: Warrington South

Walton is a civil parish in the Borough of Warrington, Cheshire, England. It is located at the southwest edge of the town of Warrington, next to the parish of Stockton Heath. It is also close to Daresbury and Moore, although these are in the neighbouring borough of Halton. Walton is part of the council ward of Hatton, Stretton and Walton. In 2001 the parish had a population of 1594.

Walton is divided into Lower Walton and Higher Walton. Higher Walton is south-west of Lower Walton, and is the location of Walton Hall. The estate of Walton Hall and its surrounding gardens, previously owned by the Greenall family, was bought by Warrington Borough Council in 1941 and is now a park with a zoo and municipal golf course.

Walton shares its annual church walking day parade with Stockton Heath. The nearest schools are Stockton Heath Primary School and Bridgewater High School.

== History ==
The name Walton comes from settlement/farmstead of Wealas - native Celts which is what the new Anglo Saxon speaking peoples called the native inhabitants of England. There is strong evidence that in many areas of England taken over by Germanic speaking settlers, the native British (Wealas) remained undisturbed, farming the same land they did when the Romans left. Over time they just adopted or forgot their Celtic tongue (similar to Old Welsh/Cornish) for the language and culture of the newcomers in order to climb the social ladder or were coerced to do so. It was in the Anglo Saxon interest that the native British carry on as usual to ensure the economy produced food and goods for the new landowners.

Higher Walton was the site of a railway accident. On 29 June 1867 two trains collided at Walton Junction due to signal error. The collision killed eight people and injured 73.

The parish was formed on 1 April 1936 from Acton Grange, Walton Superior and Walton Inferior.

== See also ==
- Listed buildings in Walton, Cheshire
- St John the Evangelist's Church, Walton
