= Walton Hall, Cheshire =

Walton Hall
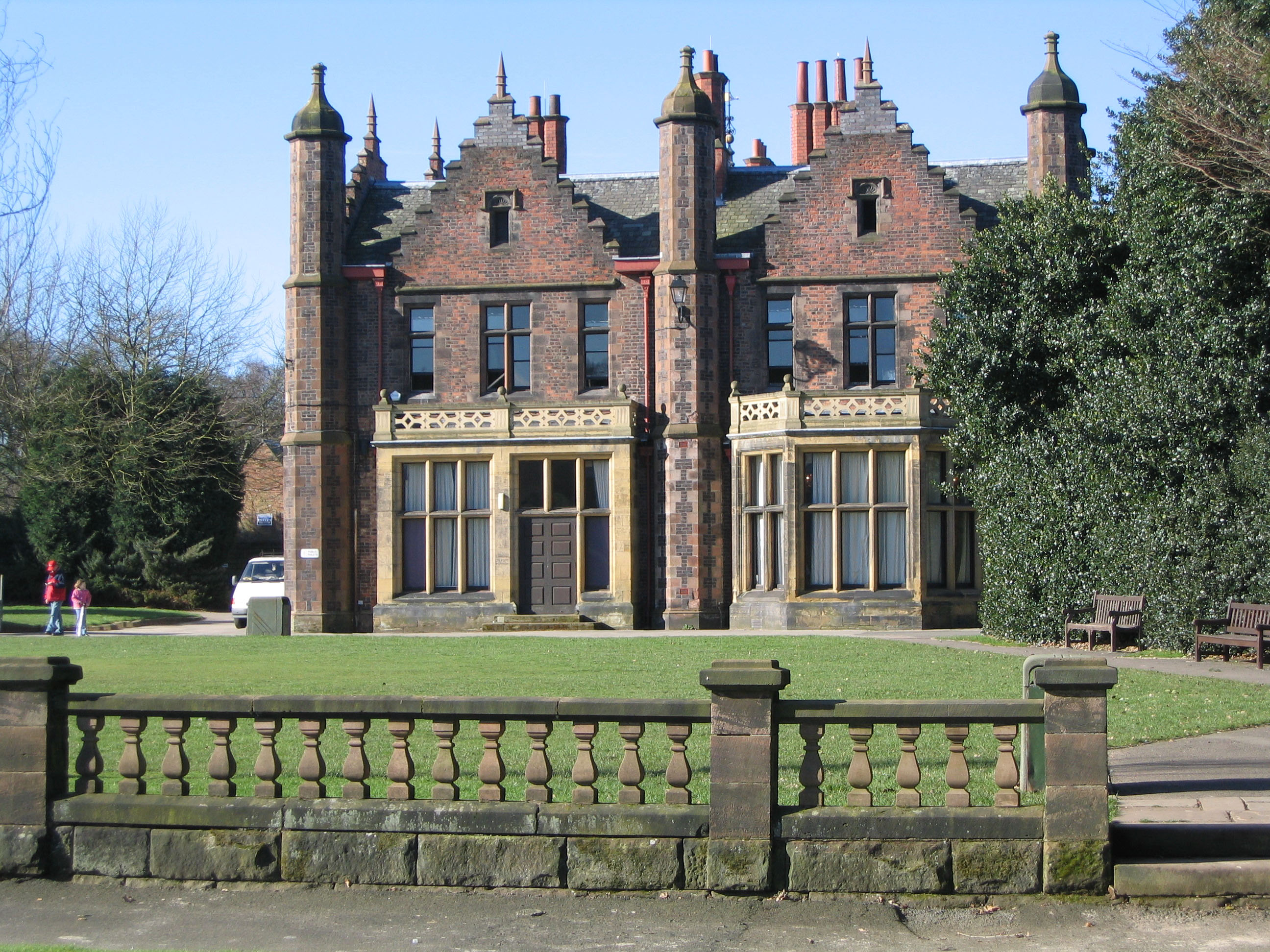
- Walton Hall, east front

- Location in Cheshire
- 53.3599°N 2.6023°W
- Location: Walton, Warrington, Cheshire, England
- OS grid reference: SJ 600,849

History
- Built: 1836–38
- Built for: Gilbert Greenall

Listed Building – Grade II
- Designated: 23 December 1983
- Reference no.: 1139355

Walton Hall is a country house in Walton, Warrington, Cheshire, England. It is recorded in the National Heritage List for England as a designated Grade II listed building. The hall and its surrounding garden and grounds are owned and administered by Warrington Borough Council.

== History ==
The house was built in 1836–38 for Sir Gilbert Greenall, 1st Baronet, brewer and Member of Parliament. The local authority website states it was designed by the Lancaster architect Edmund Sharpe. However this is not confirmed by any authoritative source. When Sir Gilbert died in 1894, the house was inherited by his son, Gilbert Greenall, 1st Baron Daresbury, who lived there until his death in 1938.

In 1869–70 the house was extended and offices were added by the Lancaster architects Paley and Austin. The extension included a new wing with a tower, containing a billiards room and rooms for guests, and a new entrance on the east front. The house and grounds were purchased by Warrington Corporation in 1941. The gardens were opened to the public in 1945. Most of Paley and Austin's extension was demolished in about 1990, but the tower was retained.

== The Greenall family ==
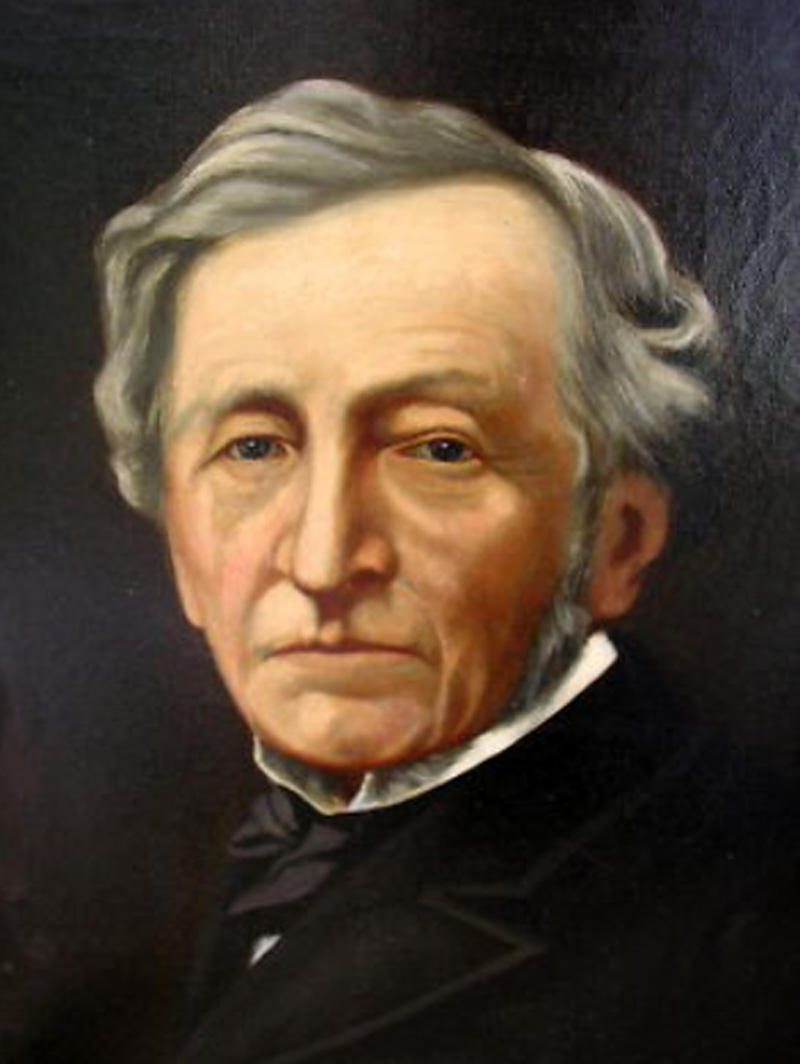
Sir Gilbert Greenall (1806–1894)

Sir Gilbert Greenall (1806–1894) built Walton Hall in 1836. He was the son of Edward Greenall (1758–1835) who had purchased the Walton Estate in 1812. At this time there was an old hall on the property north east of the present building (shown on the 1882 map) which has since been demolished. When his father died in 1835 Gilbert inherited the Walton Estate. In the following year he married Mary Claughton. In this year also he commenced building Walton Hall, a project which took two years.

He was a partner in his long established family brewing firm of Greenall Whitley & Company with his brothers and made a large fortune. He invested his money in property and became part of the landed gentry. He became a Member of Parliament from 1847 until 1892 representing Warrington. He was also High Sheriff of Cheshire in 1873 and was a Justice of the Peace. He was an art connoisseur and collected many beautiful paintings. He commissioned the famous artist Wood Warrington to create the sculpture “Rachel” in 1868. He also paid him to sculpt a marble overmantel in Walton Hall of Diana hunting. This sculpture remains today. He was a personal friend of Lewis Carroll whose father was the vicar in the nearby Church at Daresbury. He visited Carroll when he was at Oxford University and Carroll visited him at Walton Hall. A photo was taken by Carroll of the Hall in 1859 when he was there. His wife Mary died in 1861 and until this time they had no children. In 1864 at the age of 58 he married Susannah Rapp who was the daughter of John Louis Rapp. The couple had three children. Two daughters Susannah and Bertha and a son.

In 1876 he was created a Baronet on the recommendation of Benjamin Disraeli. In 1885 he built St John the Evangelist Church which is located near Walton Hall. He commissioned the architects Paley and Austin to undertake this work for an enormous sum. He died in 1894 and his only son Gilbert inherited Walton Hall.

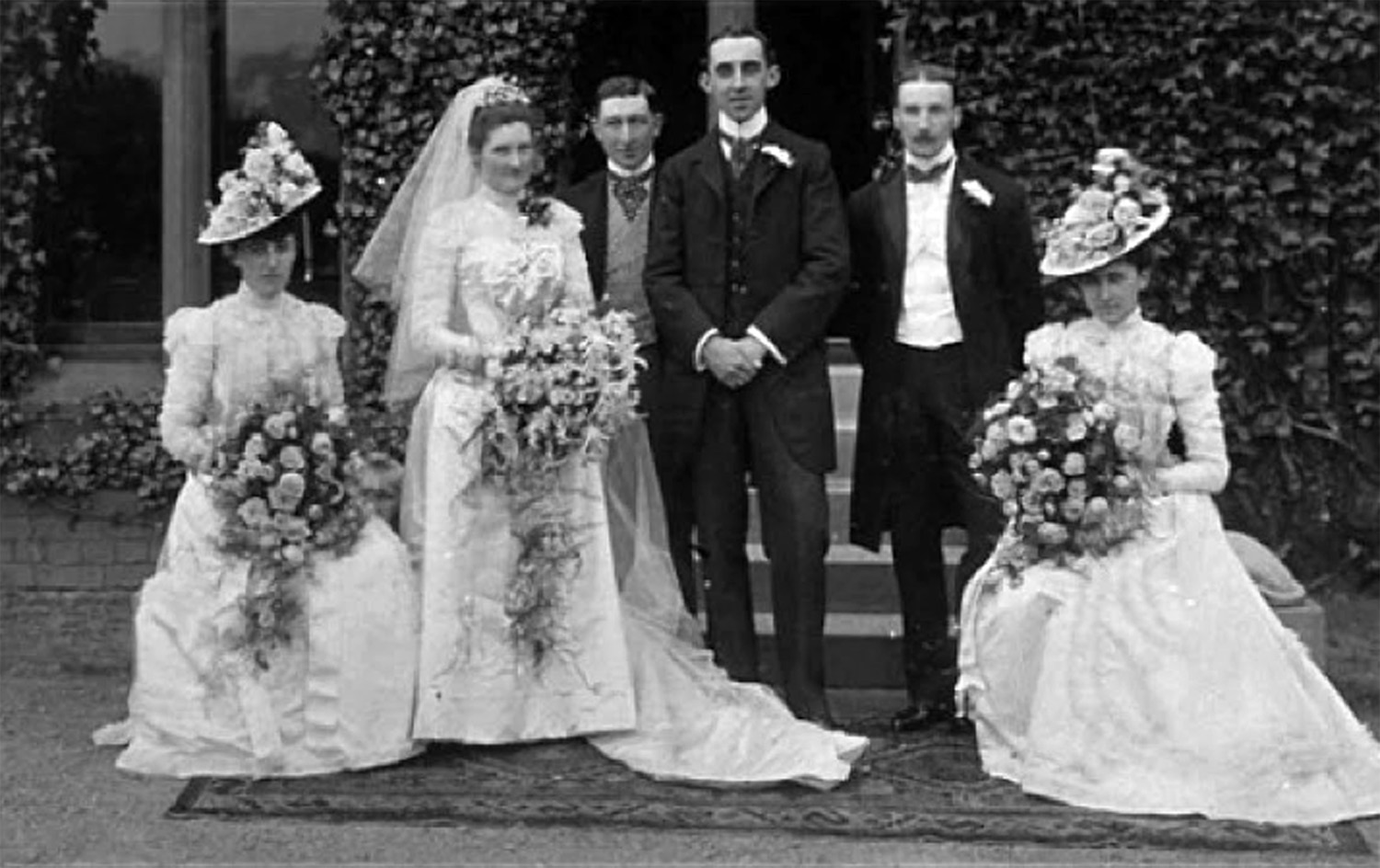
Wedding of Bertha Greenall 1898. From left to right Frances Eliza Griffith, Bertha Greenall, Sir Gilbert Greenall (1867–1938), Edward Griffith, unknown, Amy Whitley

In 1898 his daughter Bertha was married at St John the Evangelist Church to Edward Waldegrave Griffith. The reception was held at Walton Hall. The wedding was widely reported in the newspapers and some of the description is as follows.

"At a quarter past two the bridal carriage drove up to the entrance of the church and the bride was escorted into the church by her brother Sir Gilbert Greenall. She was attired in a handsome white satin dress embroidered with silver and trimmed with Brussells lace. She wore a wreath of orange blossom and tulle veil and carried a shower bouquet of white exotics, the gift of the bridegroom. Her ornament was a diamond crescent also the gift of the bridegroom.

"She was attended by two bridesmaids Miss Frances Griffith (the sister of the Bridegroom) and Miss Amy Whitley (cousin of the bride). They were dressed in pink and white striped silk skirts with chiffon bodices trimmed with bebe ribbon and cream coloured lace. Their hats were of cream coloured Tuscan straw trimmed with wreaths of forget-me-nots and pink roses. They carried shower bouquets of roses and wore gold banquets with diamond and sapphire hearts, gifts of the bridegrooms."

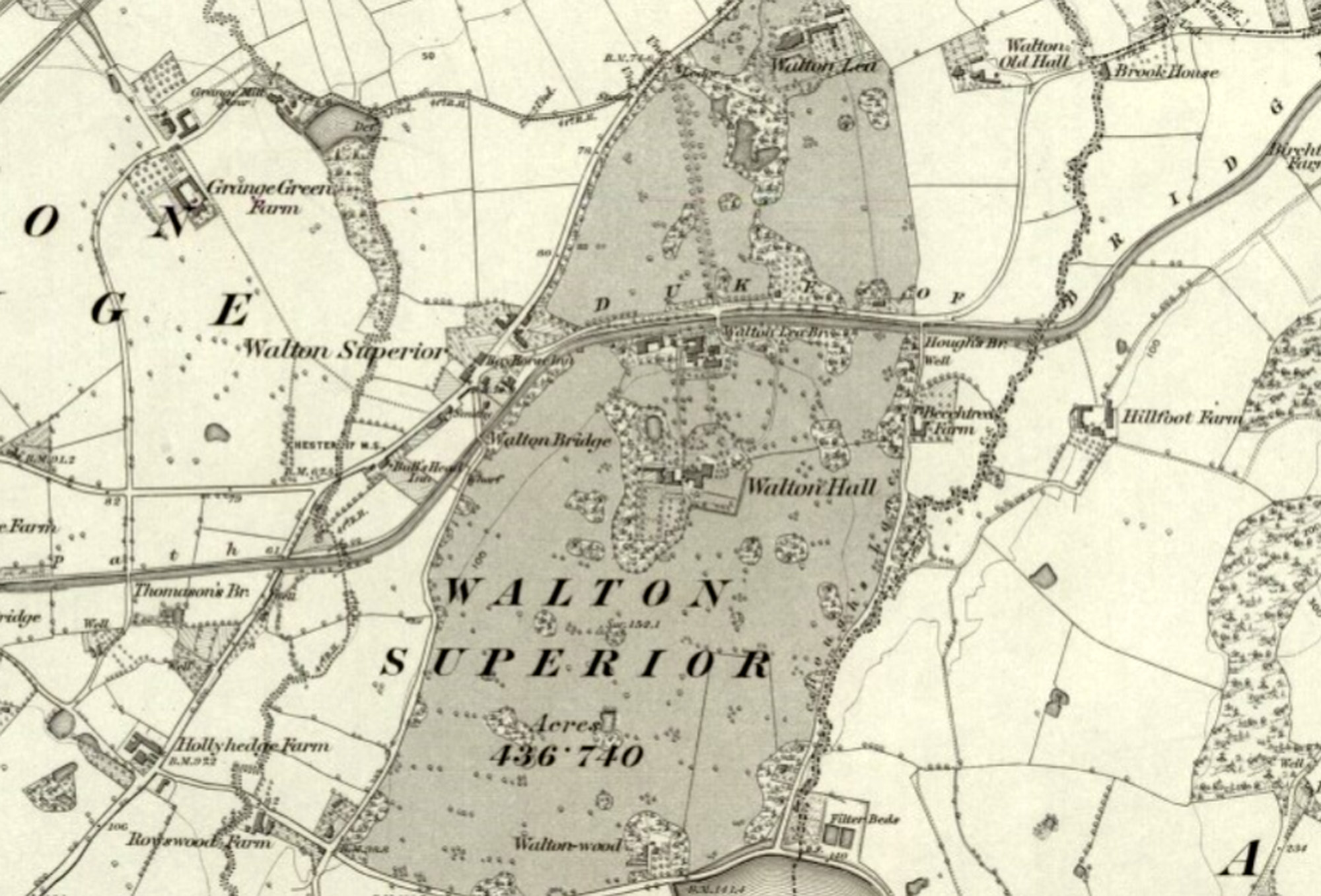
Map of Walton Hall 1882

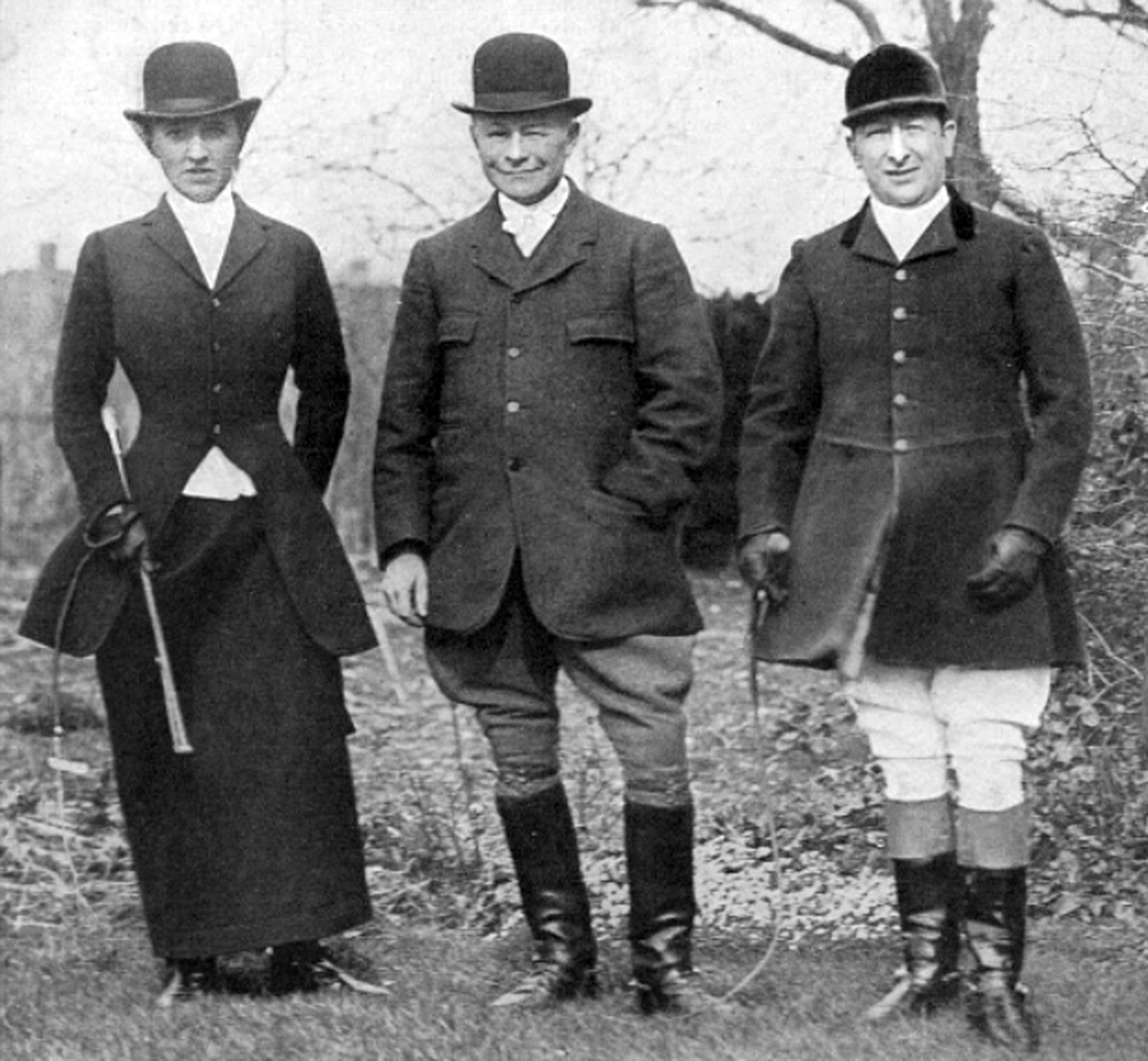
Lady Frances Greenall and Sir Gilbert Greenall (right) in 1912

Sir Gilbert Greenall (1867–1938) who inherited Walton Hall in 1894 upon the death of his father was born in 1867. He was educated at Eton College and for some time joined the Cheshire Yeomanry Cavalry. After he inherited his father's estates he became interested in the breeding of livestock and developed one of the most famous horse studs in England. His horses were mentioned in numerous newspaper articles and even in Australia his stud was described in detail.

In 1900 he married Frances Eliza Griffith who was his brother in law's sister and is shown as one of the bridesmaids in the picture above. The couple had two sons. Both Gilbert and Frances were very good horsemen and from 1896 until 1912 Gilbert was Master of the Belvoir Hunt. A photo of them during this time is shown. He was also President of the Royal Agricultural Society. He died in 1938 and his son Edward inherited Walton Hall. Edward sold the Hall in 1941 to Warrington Corporation (now Warrington Borough Council).

== Architecture ==
The house is built in brown brick with stone dressings and slate roofs. The east front has 2½ storeys and two wide bays with bay windows, two crow-stepped gables and three pinnacled octagonal buttresses. The entrance (north) front has a projecting porch. The clock tower to the west has four stages, the top stage containing the clock, and surmounted by a lead-roofed cupola and large weather vane. The south face has a mullioned and transomed window and three crow-stepped gables.

== External features ==
The retaining wall, balustrades and steps between the lawns east of the hall are listed at Grade II. Also listed at Grade II are the former lodge to the hall, and its associated gates, gatepiers and screens.

== Present day ==
The gardens and grounds are open to the public. Close to the hall are formal gardens, and in the grounds are facilities for pitch and putt, crazy golf, and bowls, and a children's zoo. A group known as the Friends of Walton Estate assist in the care and management of the estate. Each year the Warrington Disability Partnership organise a Disability Awareness Day in the grounds. Inside the hall, function rooms are available for hire, and there is a concert room. The Friends of Walton Hall Music Society organises a series of chamber music concerts in the concert room. The hall is also available for weddings. The property was used for the exterior shots in the filming of the BBC drama series Our Zoo.

Located in the Old Laundry Rooms, close to the Main Hall, is a Cycle Museum, owned and run by cycling enthusiast Paul Adams.

== See also ==
- Listed buildings in Walton, Cheshire
- List of non-ecclesiastical works by Paley and Austin
- List of parks and open spaces in Cheshire
- Walton Lea Walled Garden
