= St Peter's Church, Aston-by-Sutton =

Church in Cheshire, England

Coordinates: 53.3012°N 2.6679°W

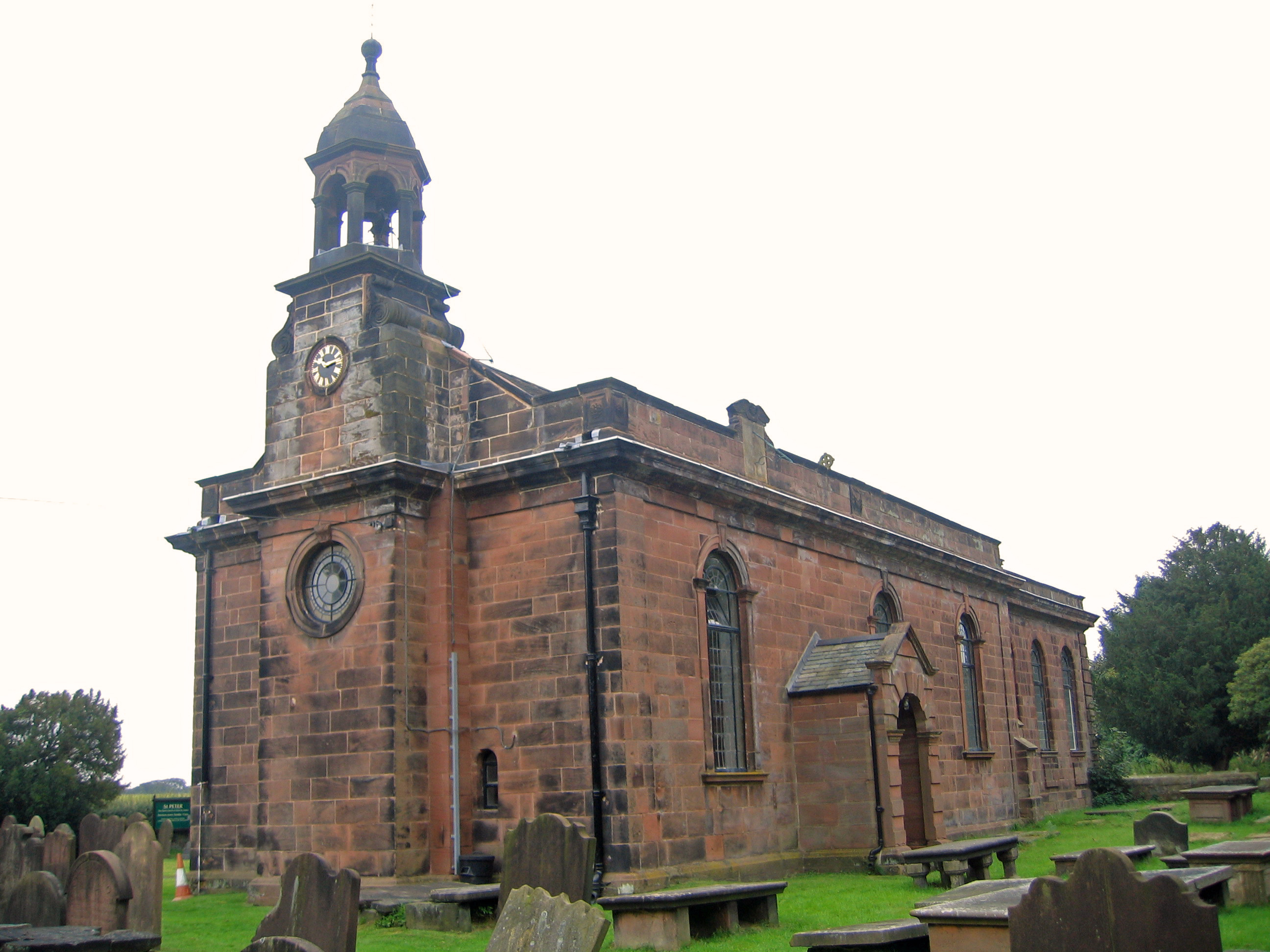
- St Peter's Church, Aston-by-Sutton, from the southwest

- Location in Cheshire
- OS grid reference: SJ 555 785
- Location: Aston Lane,Sutton Weaver, Cheshire WA7 3ED
- Country: England
- Denomination: Anglican
- Churchmanship: Central
- Website: Parish of Aston-by-Sutton, Little Leigh & Lower Whitley

History
- Status: Parish church
- Dedication: St Peter

Architecture
- Functional status: Active
- Heritage designation: Grade I
- Designated: 8 January 1970
- Architect: John Vanbrugh (?)
- Architectural type: Church
- Style: Georgian
- Groundbreaking: 1520s

Specifications
- Materials: Sandstone, Roof of grey slate tiles

Administration
- Province: York
- Diocese: Chester
- Archdeaconry: Chester
- Deanery: Great Budworth
- Parish: Aston-by-Sutton, St Peter

Clergy
- Vicar: Rev Dr Collette Jones

St Peter's Church is in the small hamlet of Aston-by-Sutton, Cheshire near to the town of Runcorn. The church is recorded in the National Heritage List for England as a designated Grade I listed building. It is an active Anglican parish church in the diocese of Chester, the archdeaconry of Chester and the deanery of Great Budworth. It is one of three parish churches in the parish of Aston-by-Sutton, Little Leigh and Lower Whitley. The other two being St Michael and All Angels, Little Leigh and St Luke, Lower Whitley. The three were previously individual parishes united in a benefice along with St Mark, Antrobus. The listing describes it as "a most pleasing late 17th to early 18th-century church, inside and out". The church stands in a relatively isolated position in the south side of Aston Lane in the hamlet.

== History ==
=== Early history ===
The first religious building in the hamlet was a chapel of ease in the parish of Runcorn built in 1236 by Sir Thomas de Dutton which was known as the chapel of Poosey (or Pooseye). Towards the end of the 13th century the bishop of Lichfield (in whose diocese the chapel then was) received a complaint and he gave orders that a chaplain and a lamp should be provided by the prior of Norton Priory. The chapel remained in use until a domestic chapel was built at Dutton Hall and Poosey chapel fell into decay and became a ruin.

The first chapel on the site of the present church was built in the early 16th century, not later than 1542. All that remains of this chapel is a stone in the churchyard which has been used for sharpening spears and knives. This chapel was damaged in the English Civil War. In 1637 the chapel was refurnished and restored by Sir Thomas Aston. Following this the present chancel was built in 1697 for Sir Willoughby Aston, the architect being Thomas Webb, and the mason has been named as Edward Nixon. The nave was reconstructed between 1736 and 1740. By 1857 the Aston family pews on the north and south sides of the chancel had been replaced by choirstalls. An organ chamber was added to the south side of the chancel in 1897, obliterating one of the windows. It was rebuilt in 1907.

=== Bomb damage ===
The church was badly damaged by a land mine on 28 November 1940; damage was caused to the roof and the interior of the church. The roof was replaced but the church was still unusable and services were held elsewhere. It remained derelict until restoration began on 30 May 1949; this was completed in June 1950. The church was re-hallowed on 27 June 1950 by the Bishop of Chester. Until it was damaged by the land mine, it was one of the least restored early Georgian churches in the diocese of Chester. The damage mainly involved the south side and the east end of the church. The south porch was completely destroyed, as was the organ chamber in the chancel. Also destroyed were the sundial over the south porch and the stone cross on the gable at the east end. In 2004 the church received a grant of £35,000 under the Repair Grants for Places of Worship scheme.

== Architecture ==
=== Exterior ===
The church is built in Runcorn sandstone with a roof of grey slate tiles. Its plan consists of a chancel and nave, north and south porches, a western tower on which is a cupola belfry. The cupola has a circular window with a clock above it. There is a circular east window with a niche on either side. The three-bay chancel is narrower than the nave; both are surmounted by a plain parapet. There are no windows on the north side of the chancel, but a door is present which formerly led to the part of the churchyard reserved for burial of the lord of the manor and his family. On the south side were three round-headed windows, two of which are original and the other restored after the bomb damage. On each side of the nave are three round-headed windows, similar to those in the chancel. Between the nave and chancel, on both north and south sides, are buttresses. The north porch is dated 1736 and is in the style of Vanburgh. The south porch and the sundial, damaged in the explosion, have been restored. The authors of the Buildings of England series comment that the architectural style of the nave is Georgian, and that of the chancel is pre-Georgian.

=== Interior ===
The floor of the chancel is original, dating from the 17th century, and consists of square white stones with insets of black marble at the intersections. The west gallery is now occupied by an organ which was built in 1906 by Ernest Wadsworth Ltd and installed in 1908. It is supported by four wooden piers. On its front are panels above which is a cornice decorated with dentilling. It is accessed by a circular staircase with rails on balusters. The pews are of oak, as is the pulpit which probably dates from the 17th century. The pulpit is carried on an octagonal stalk, and is decorated with scrolls and pendants. The altar table also dates from the 17th century, and is in Jacobean style. The ceiling is plastered and has an oval-ended central panel. Over the south door are royal arms dated 1664 and over the north door is a heraldic panel dating from the early 18th century relating to the Aston family. The font dates from 1857. It is in carved timber, contains a marble bowl, and has a domed lid. Also in the church is an armorial board of the Aston family. This probably dates from 1636, was perhaps painted by Randle Holme, and has since been repainted. The memorials include two similar painted and gilded tablets in the chancel to members of the Aston family who died in 1635 and 1637 respectively; they include columns, putti, and broken pediments. Another monument built in 1637 is to the memory of two other members of the family; it consists of a tablet on a sarcophagus surrounded by drapery. There is a monument to Sir Willoughby Aston who died in 1702 consisting of a shield held by putti under a baldacchino; this has been attributed to Grinling Gibbons. One of the monuments is to a steward of the family who died in 1706. Other memorials to the family date from 1737 to the 19th century. Following the land mine damage, the organ was rebuilt by Jardine & Co Ltd. The single church bell is inscribed "Crescent city 1870" and is thought to have originally been a ship's bell. The parish registers of baptisms and deaths both date from 1635, but both have gaps. The churchwardens' accounts begin in 1761 and are complete.

== External features ==
Two portions of the sandstone churchyard wall dating probably from the late 17th century and the lych gate dated 1908 are listed Grade II. In the churchyard is a former red sandstone font dating probably from the early 17th century which is listed Grade II. It has a circular base and an arched cover carved from two blocks of stone, which is unique in Cheshire. Also listed Grade II are tombs to William and Mary Okell, dated 1837, John Okell and others, dated 1697, James Okell and others, dated 1748, John Burke (?), dated 1713, John Egerton, dated 1652, Edward and Mary Woodhouse, dated 1718, Mary Fletcher, dated 1776, Mary and Robert Okell, dated 1770, and Roll Okell and others, dated 1775. Another memorial in the churchyard is the grave of Chloe. Chloe was a slave from Gambia who was born around 1760 and who arrived in Liverpool in 1767. She spent her life as a servant to the Aston family, being given the surname of Gambia, and rose to the position of housekeeper. She died from breast cancer in 1838. The inscription on her gravestone reads:

Chloe Gambia a negress Who died at Aston Hall the 12th Sept. 1838 aged 77 years or thereabouts. She lived in the Aston family 70 years.

Also in the churchyard are two war graves of World War I soldiers of the King's Liverpool Regiment.

== See also ==
- Grade I listed buildings in Cheshire West and Chester
- Grade I listed churches in Cheshire
