= Keckwick =

Area of the Borough of Halton, Cheshire, England

Coordinates: 53.347°N 2.646°W

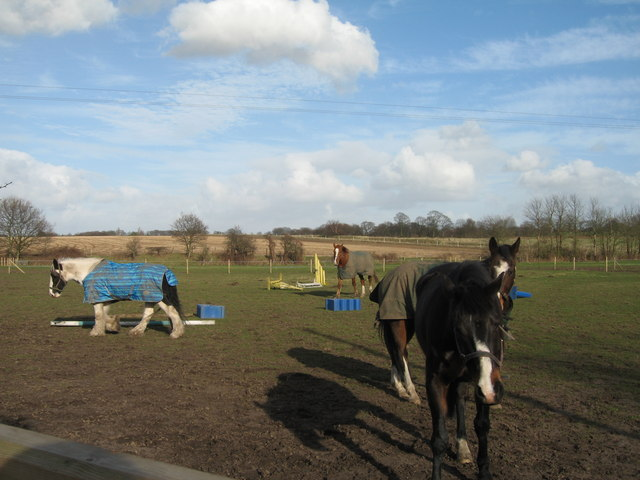
- Horses at New Farm, in the former parish

- Location within Cheshire
- Civil parish: Daresbury
- Unitary authority: Halton
- Ceremonial county: Cheshire
- Region: North West
- Country: England
- Sovereign state: United Kingdom

Keckwick is an area in the civil parish of Daresbury, in the Halton district, in the ceremonial county of Cheshire, England. It straddles the West Coast Main Line between the village of Daresbury and the new town of Runcorn.

== History ==
Kekewick was formerly a township in the parish of Runcorn. In 1866, Keckwick became a separate civil parish, in 1894 it became part of Runcorn Rural District. On 1 April 1936, the parish was abolished and merged with Daresbury. In 1931, the parish had a population of 54. The area of Keckwick to the west of the West Coast Main Line was designated as part of Runcorn New Town in 1964 and the land initially allocated to industry. The new town masterplan was amended in 1975 and the land redesignated for a residential community called Sandymoor. Since 2008, this area has been under Sandymoor Parish Council, while the part of Keckwick to the east of the West Coast Main Line is under Daresbury Parish Council.

== Geography ==
Keckwick Brook is believed to be the feature that gives its name to the area as it can be followed north–south from the edge of the Manchester Ship Canal, crossing the Daresbury Expressway (A558), to track between the two canal branches, the Bridgewater Canal and the Cheshire Ring, skirting the West Coast Mainline (WCML) railway line, and passing east of Preston Brook before crossing the M56 motorway and on to its source on Preston Hill.

To the north-east, Keckwick Lane skirts just inside the Daresbury Expressway, to the junction with the A56.

On the eastern edge, the Keckwick Bridges are a number of minor bridges crossing the Bridgewater Canal, where it forms part of the Cheshire Ring. Keckwick Hill Bridge No.4 is known simply as the Keckwick Hill Bridge, or else the Delph Lane canal-bridge. Keckwick Bridge No.5 is simply the Keckwick Bridge, or else the Keckwick Lane canal-bridge. It is an arch bridge. Keckwick Bridge No.5A is the bridge for the A558 Daresbury Expressway. The Keckwick Pipe Bridge, just north of the Expressway, is not a bridge as such, but rather a structure to hold a pipe over the canal.

At the centre of the Keckwick area lies Poplar Farm. The Farm is situated between the WCML and the Chester-Manchester railway lines and there is an intersection just to the south-west, where the Chester-Manchester line passes over the WCML on a bridge. The viaduct over the Brook, which lies in turn just to the west of that intersection, is sometimes referred to as: the 'Keckwick Viaduct'.
