= Walking day =

Type of church parade

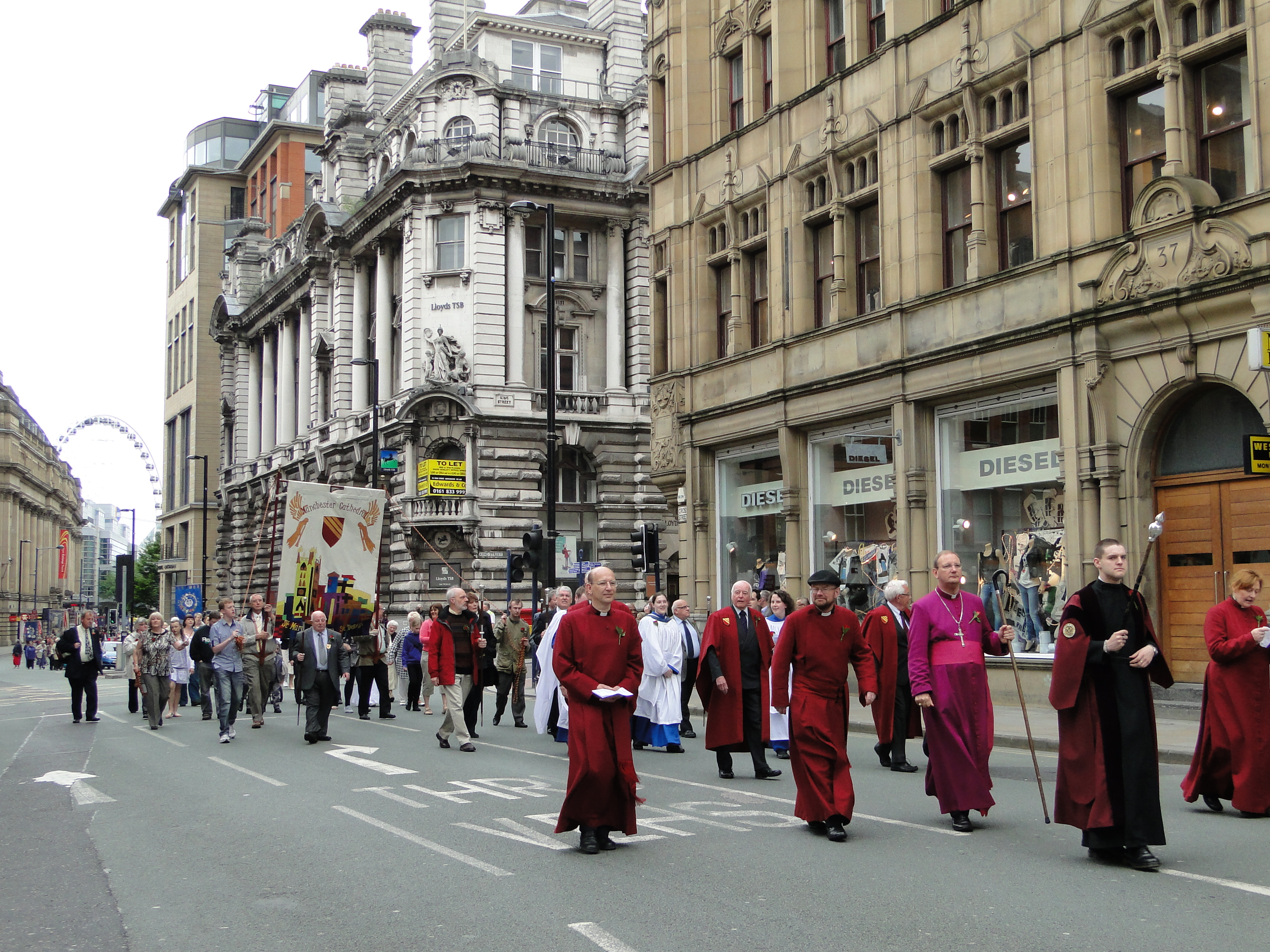
2010 Whit walks in Manchester on Cross Street showing the banner and clergy from Manchester Cathedral

A walking day is a type of church parade. Walking days are most common in North West England, where they are an annual event for many towns and villages. In some rural communities in the North West they are known as Field Days, Gala Days or Club Days.

There may be several churches involved in a local walking day, however, most 'church' walking days are held individually for each church (the Walking Days in Warrington are a notable exception to this as they all benefit from the participation of multiple churches from many denominations). The churches hire bands to provide music: for instance brass bands, pipe bands and marching bands. The police provide an escort and control the road traffic, but some police forces are now refusing to provide escorts out of public funds, and this may threaten many of these traditional events.

Children play a big part through their churches, schools, the Boys' Brigade, the Scouts and the Girl Guides.

Non-church processions are often led by a young lady, who has been crowned the "Rose Queen" for the year. The Queen may be particular to a church but can represent the whole village too. Indeed, some Rose Queens and May Queens have festivals of their own. For example, there is the "Lymm May Queen", "Knutsford May Queen" and the "Thelwall Rose Queen"

Walking days are particularly common in the Warrington, St Helens, Prescot and Wigan areas. They are held annually in most districts, including:

- Grappenhall
- Orford
- Padgate
- Penketh
- Stockton Heath
- Stretton
- Warrington
- Winwick
- Rainford
- Ashton-in-Makerfield
- Haydock
- Newton le Willows
- Croft

Some walking days, including those held in Warrington, Orford, Padgate, Stockton Heath and Stretton, are followed by a fair. A particular feature of the walks is that the spectators lining the streets, when they see children they know walking in the parade, will run out into the road and give the children money. The children often use the money collected in this way to spend on the fair later in the day.

Warrington Walking Day itself dates back to 1834, and is perhaps the largest in terms of attendance and participation. Churches now walk in ecumenical groups from each area. Most businesses in the town used to close for the day, but as Warrington has expanded, many firms have national and international business that demands attention. A detailed history of Warrington Walking Day can be found in the University of Sheffield National Fairground Archive.
