= Aston-by-Sutton =

Coordinates: 53.3°N 2.663°W

Aston
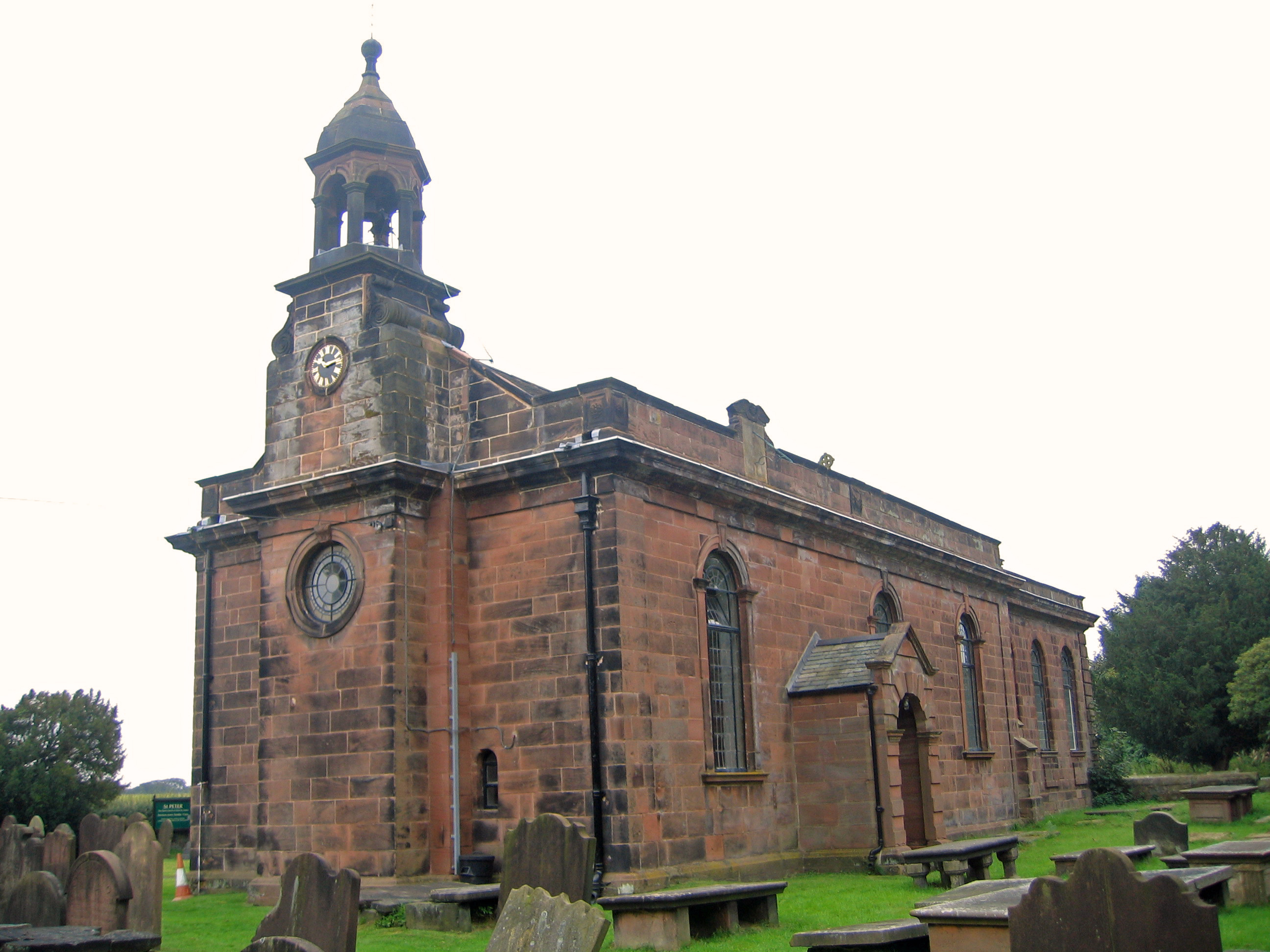
- St. Peter's Church, Aston-By-Sutton

- Location within Cheshire
- Population: 106 (2011 census)
- OS grid reference: SJ558783
- Civil parish: Aston
- Unitary authority: Cheshire West and Chester
- Ceremonial county: Cheshire
- Region: North West
- Country: England
- Sovereign state: United Kingdom
- Post town: RUNCORN
- Postcode district: WA7
- Dialling code: 01928
- Police: Cheshire
- Fire: Cheshire
- Ambulance: North West
- UK Parliament: Tatton

Aston (or Aston-by-Sutton) is a village and civil parish in the unitary authority area of Cheshire West and Chester and the ceremonial county of Cheshire, England. According to the 2001 census it had a population of 111, reducing slightly to 106 at the 2011 census. The village is just outside the Runcorn urban area. From 1974 to 2009 it was in Vale Royal district.

St Peter's Church is a Grade I listed building.

Aston was the seat of the Aston baronets of the County of Chester (baronetcy created 1628, extinct 1815).

Aston-by-Sutton was formerly a township and chapelry in the parish of Runcorn, in 1866 Aston by Sutton became a separate civil parish, on 9 November 1936 the parish was abolished and merged with Aston Grange to form "Aston". In 1931 the parish of Aston by Sutton had a population of 220.

== See also ==
- Listed buildings in Aston-by-Sutton
