= Listed buildings in Stockton Heath =

Stockton Heath is a civil parish located to the south of Warrington, Cheshire, England. It was formerly a separate village but, with the growth of the town, it is now a suburb of Warrington. It stands at the crossroads of the A49 and the A56 roads, and is traversed by the Bridgewater and the Manchester Ship Canals. Stockton Heath contains 12 buildings that are recorded in the National Heritage List for England as designated listed buildings, all of which are listed at Grade II. This grade is the lowest of the three gradings given to listed buildings and is applied to "buildings of national importance and special interest".

Name and location	Photograph	Date	Notes
Lumb Brook Bridge; 53.3702°N 2.5694°W		1770	An aqueduct carrying the Bridgewater Canal and towpath over Lumb Brook Road. Designed by James Brindley, it is constructed in sandstone with a brick lining to the arch and a brick parapet. A ramped footpath with sandstone retaining walls climbs from the road to the towpath.
Redlane Bridge; 53.3654°N 2.5878°W		c. 1770	A road bridge carrying Red Lane across the Bridgewater Canal; designed by James Brindley. It is constructed in brown brick with a sandstone band to the arch.
Cottage, Grappenhall Road; 53.3711°N 2.5702°W		c. 1800 or earlier	A two-storey house in brown brick with slate roofs and two recessed 20-pane recessed sash windows.
Red Lion Inn; 53.3709°N 2.5818°W		c. 1800	A public house with outbuildings, constructed in brick with Welsh slate roofs, and rusticated quoins. It is in three storeys, and its interior has retained multiple separate rooms and a drinking lobby.
12, 14, 16, 18 and 20 London Road; 53.3721°N 2.5818°W	—	Early 19th century	A terrace of six cottages in brown brick with slate roofs. Each cottage in two storeys, and has one 16-pane sash window. The doorways have rounded arches and radial-bar fanlights.
Brook House, Whitefield Road; 53.3652°N 2.5935°W	—	Early 19th century	A two-storey house in brown brick with a grey slate roof and five 12-pane recessed sash windows.
St Thomas' Vicarage; 53.3689°N 2.5861°W	—	1838 (probable)	A symmetrical two-storey house with rendered brick walls and a hipped slate roof. It has a prostyle portico carried on square piers with a simple entablature.
St Thomas' Church; 53.3723°N 2.5825°W		1868	Constructed in sandstone, the church was designed by E. G. Paley replacing an earlier church on the site. It consists of a nave with a south aisle, a south porch, a north transept, a north vestry, a chancel and a west tower.
Milestone, London Road; 53.3731°N 2.5820°W		1896	A cast iron triangular milestone with cast figuring, standing on the east side of the A49 road to the south of the Northwich Road Swing Bridge crossing the Manchester Ship Canal.
Milestone, Victoria Square; 53.3705°N 2.5810°W		1898	Standing in a prominent position at the crossroads in Victoria Square, this is a triangular milestone in cast iron with cast lettering.
Mulberry Tree Hotel; 53.3709°N 2.5813°W		1902	Designed as a hotel and shop by William and Segar Owen, later used as a public house. It is in free Neo-Jacobean style with an L-plan, constructed in red brick with blue brick diapering, inserted decorative stones in the upper storey, sandstone and terracotta dressings, and a green slate roof.
Police station 53.3709°N 2.5808°W		1912	Originally built as a police station and magistrates' court with residential accommodation for policemen. It is constructed in red brick with red sandstone dressings and a red tiled roof, and has 2 1/2 storeys.
