= Appleton Thorn =

Village in Cheshire, England

Coordinates: 53.3508°N 2.5441°W

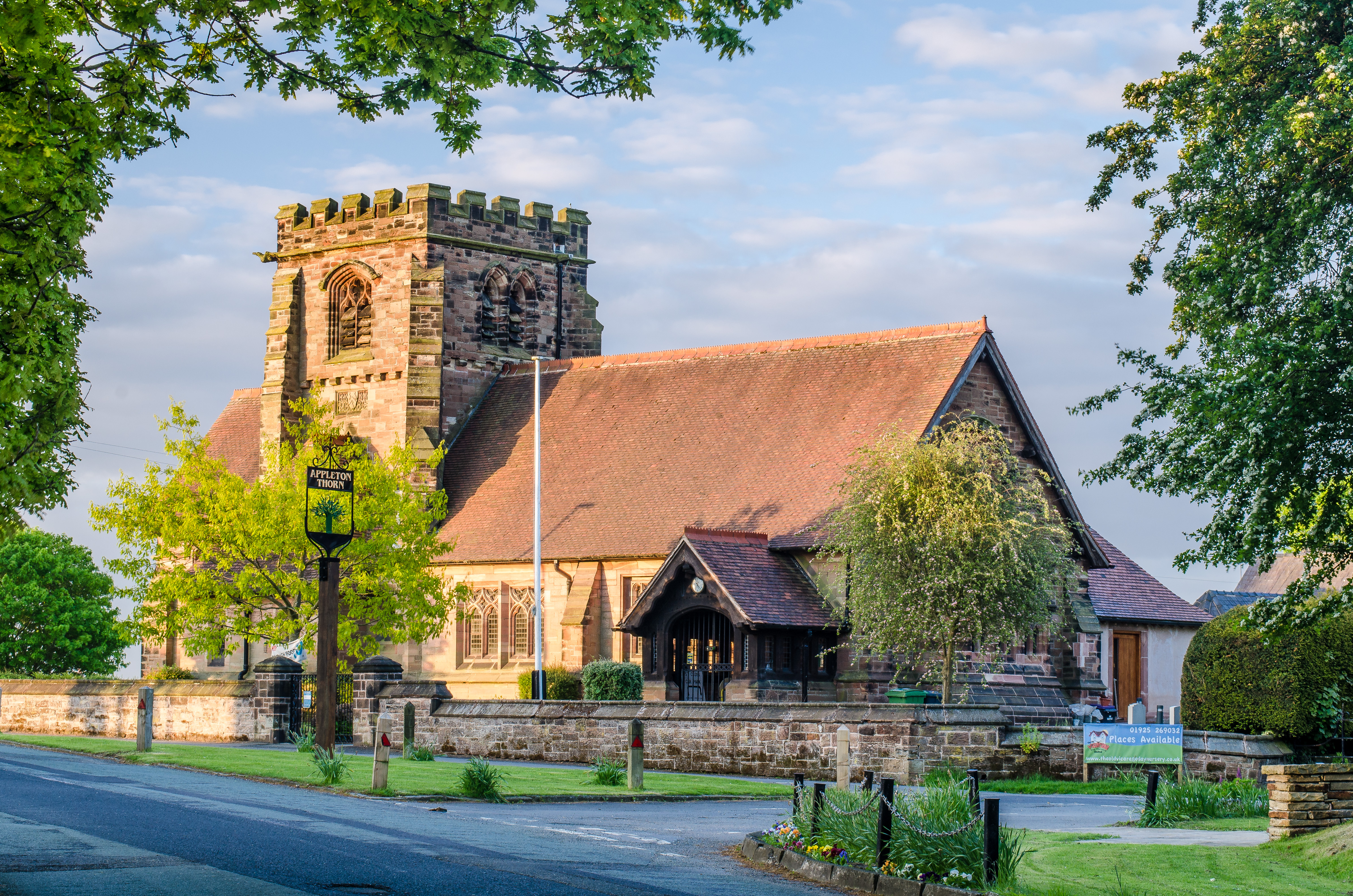
- St. Cross Church, Appleton Thorn

- Location within Cheshire
- Population: 10,477 (2001)
- OS grid reference: SJ640839
- Civil parish: Appleton
- Unitary authority: Warrington
- Ceremonial county: Cheshire
- Region: North West
- Country: England
- Sovereign state: United Kingdom
- Post town: WARRINGTON
- Postcode district: WA4
- Dialling code: 01925
- Police: Cheshire
- Fire: Cheshire
- Ambulance: North West
- UK Parliament: Warrington South

Appleton Thorn is a village in the borough of Warrington in Cheshire, England.

Appleton appeared in the Domesday survey as Epeltune, meaning "the tun where the apples grew".

== Bawming the Thorn ==
Each June, the village hosts the ceremony of "Bawming the Thorn". The current form of the ceremony dates from the 19th century, when it was part of the village's "walking day". It involved children from Appleton Thorn Primary School walking through the village and holding sports and games at the school. This now takes place at the village hall. The ceremony stopped in the 1930s, but was revived by the then headmaster, Bob Jones, in 1973. "Bawming the Thorn" occurs on the Saturday nearest to Midsummer's Day.

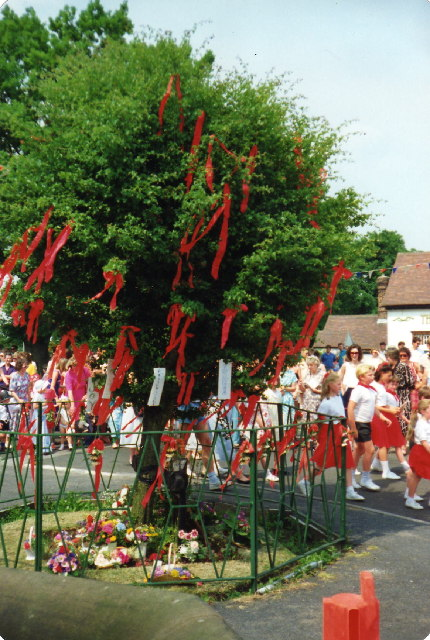
Bawming the Thorn

Local schoolchildren dance around the tree in the style of a maypole chanting verses to the tune of Bonnie Dundee, with the following repeated chorus:

Up with fresh garlands this midsummer morn,
Up with red ribbons on Appleton Thorn.
Come lasses and lads to the Thorn Tree today
To bawm it and shout as ye bawm it "Hurray"!

Bawming means "decorating" – during the ceremony the thorn tree is decorated with ribbons and garlands. According to legend, the hawthorn at Appleton Thorn grew from a cutting of the Holy Thorn at Glastonbury, which was itself said to have sprung from the staff of Joseph of Arimathea, the man who arranged for Jesus's burial after the crucifixion.

== Encompasses ==
Thorn Cross (HM Prison) is in Appleton Thorn, on the site formerly occupied by Royal Naval Air Station HMS Blackcap, a wartime aircrew training and aircraft repair airfield. There are a number of graves of aircrew who died at HMS Blackcap, mainly in flying accidents, in St Cross churchyard, known locally as "the war graves".

== Administration ==
Appleton Thorn falls under the borough of Warrington ward of Grappenhall and Thelwall, and the UK House of Commons constituency of Warrington South, whose MP since 2024 is Sarah Hall of the Labour Party.

== Popular culture ==
The Beatles song 'While My Guitar Gently Weeps' - complete with a solo by Eric Clapton - was written by George Harrison in Appleton Thorn.

At the time he was staying at his parents' home, Sevenoaks, a bungalow on Old Pewterspear Lane. He had bought the property in the mid-Sixties for mum and dad Harry and Louise as an escape from eager fans who had turned their Liverpool home into a shrine.

== See also ==
- Listed buildings in Appleton, Cheshire
