= Stockton Heath =

Suburb of Warrington in Cheshire, England

Coordinates: 53.3732°N 2.5794°W

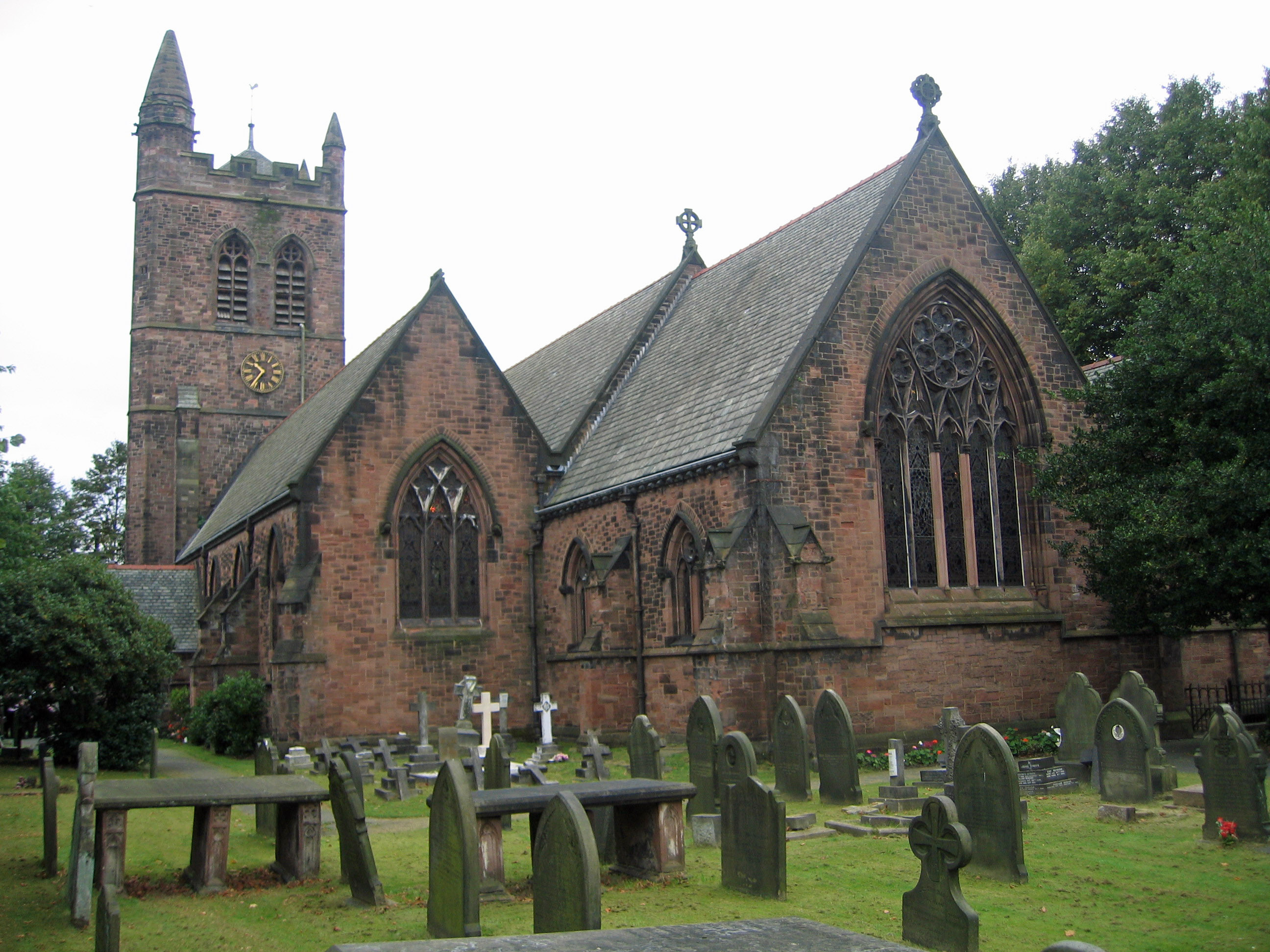
- St Thomas's Church, Stockton Heath

- Location within Cheshire
- Population: 6,396 (2001)
- OS grid reference: SJ614864
- Civil parish: Stockton Heath
- Unitary authority: Warrington
- Ceremonial county: Cheshire
- Region: North West
- Country: England
- Sovereign state: United Kingdom
- Post town: WARRINGTON
- Postcode district: WA4
- Dialling code: 01925
- Police: Cheshire
- Fire: Cheshire
- Ambulance: North West
- UK Parliament: Warrington South

Stockton Heath is a civil parish and suburb of Warrington, in the Borough of Warrington, Cheshire, England. It is located to the north of the Bridgewater Canal and to the south of the Manchester Ship Canal, which divides Stockton Heath from Latchford and north Warrington. It has a total resident population of 6,396.

Victoria Square is at the centre of Stockton Heath and is on the crossroads of the A49 and A56. Until the 1970s, the Victoria Hotel stood on this square but its location has been redeveloped. North of the square is the main shopping area which includes the Forge Shopping Centre, developed on the site of the old forge (Caldwell's). Stockton Heath is home to a number of modern bars and restaurants, as well as traditional public houses. The Red Lion Inn dates back to the early 19th century. The Mulberry Tree Inn on Victoria Square opened its present building in March 1907, replacing earlier premises from 1725.

Since 1988, much of the centre of Stockton Heath has been designated a conservation area to preserve its character but, at the same time, there has been redevelopment work with several new bars and restaurants moving into the centre of Stockton Heath.

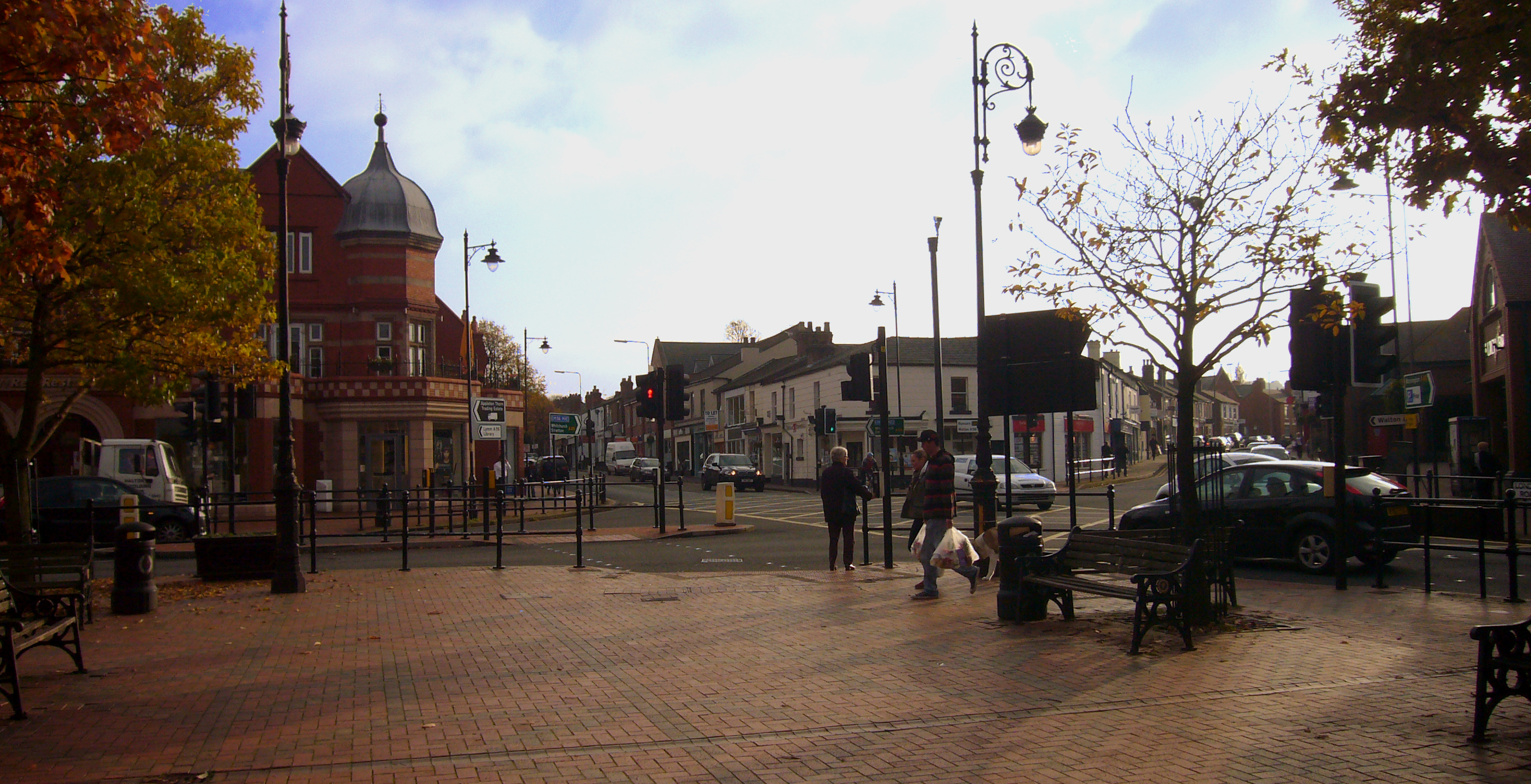
Victoria Square, London Road

== History ==
A Roman road ran through Stockton Heath, along the route now known as Roman Road. There have been some excavations; more information is available at Warrington Museum.

Excavations of the large Roman industrial settlement in the suburbs of modern-day Wilderspool and Stockton Heath have unearthed a Roman mask, one of only a handful found in Europe, and the first evidence of this settlement was unearthed during the early excavation of the Bridgewater Canal in Stockton Heath in 1770. Primary evidence points to a probable temple to Minerva on the site, a strong focus on pottery and glass bead paste making industries, and a trapezoidal building of unidentified purpose. that one author suggests may have been an auxiliary fort.

Although the name Stockton Heath appears to have been conferred on the village at a later date (indeed the area itself has been described rather as "a hamlet of little consequence and no development until the 19th century"), many secondary references state that a family bearing the name Stockton lived in the area from the end of the 13th century until at least the end of the 15th.

In 1643, parliamentarian forces under the command of Sir William Brereton advanced from Northwich to launch an attack on Warrington, the Lancashire headquarters of the royalist leader James Stanley, 7th Earl of Derby. Sir William's troops were routed at the "Battle of Stockton Heath". Unverified local legend has it that many of the parliamentarian soldiers were buried at Hill Cliffe and Budworth. The battle is referred to in the 1859 novel Hollywood Hall by James Grant:

"A priory, situated in a wooded hollow, ruined and battered as the Royalists had left it in 1643, next caught my eye, when, riding rapidly on, I approached a wide waste common called Stockton Heath, past which the Mersey rolled amid swamps and morasses filled with rushes and willows."

The same novel frequently refers to Stockton Heath as a "waste" and makes numerous references to swamps nearby. This description contrasts sharply with the variants of "fashionable shopping village" frequently encountered in the literature of estate agents today.

Early maps refer to a hamlet by the name of Stoken (or Stocken) where the present village of Stockton Heath now stands. However, more detailed old maps of the area of Acton Grange show a sparsely populated hamlet and refers only to the old buildings and bridges recognisable today in street names in the area, such as Whitefield Cottage.

The Bridgewater Canal, one of two canals that pass through the village, reached Stockton Heath in 1772, the year of the death of its designer, James Brindley

In the 1900s George Formby Senior moved his young family to Stockton Heath and it was from here that George Formby Junior began his entertainment career. Their house, Hillcrest, is a listed building. George Formby Senior died in Stockton Heath in 1921.

In 1974, Stockton Heath, historically part of Cheshire, became incorporated into the borough of Warrington under the Local Government Act 1972. Warrington, historically part of Lancashire, became a Cheshire borough under the act.

2008 saw the first ever Stockton Heath Festival, which is now going into its twelfth year. It is situated on Mill Lane Field in Stockton Heath, although it takes place over many venues throughout Grappenhall, Appleton and Stockton Heath. In 2011, the Stockton Heath Festival attracted 12,000 visitors.

== Schools ==
The original LEA primary school of 1910 was demolished in October 2008, despite a strong campaign to retain it, after a new school had been built adjacent. There is also St Thomas C of E Primary School now located next to Alexandra Park. This was opened in 1974 and moved from its original site opposite St Thomas' Church. The original St Thomas' school was opened in 1833 and the building was eventually demolished (along with a late Victorian extension) in the late 1970s. On its site now stands a modern health centre.

== Geography and administration ==
Stockton Heath is low-lying between the Manchester Ship canal and the Bridgewater canal. The elevation here is less than 10m. The land rises to about 80m south of M56 motorway.

On the south side of the Manchester Ship Canal, Stockton Heath adjoins Appleton, Grappenhall and Walton.

It typically takes between seven and ten minutes on the bus and about twenty-five to thirty-five minutes on foot to reach Warrington town centre.

Stockton Heath is administered at a local level by the Stockton Heath Parish Council, and at a wider level by Warrington Borough Council.

=== Political representation ===
Stockton Heath forms part of the Warrington South parliamentary constituency which is represented in the House of Commons by Sarah Hall (Labour) since July 2024.

Stockton Heath is a multi-member ward within Warrington borough. As of May 2024 it is served by two Liberal Democrat councillors, Sharon Harris and Judith Wheeler.

Stockton Heath is also served by a parish council, comprising seventeen members, including the two borough councillors. Part of its responsibility is to facilitate dialogue with Warrington Borough Council.

== Demographics ==
Data is based on that of Stockton Heath Ward

=== Population ===
- Total population: 6,420 residents
- Male:Female ratio: 48.9%:51.1%
- Average age of population: 39.9 years

==== Ethnicity breakdown ====
- 99.1% White
- 0.5% Mixed
- 0.1% Black
- 0.3% Asian
- 0.1% Other

=== Housing and social situation ===
==== Housing situation ====
- Households: 2,700
  - 84.9% are owner occupied houses
  - 6.9% are rented council houses
  - 6.7% are privately rented houses
  - 1.4% are rent free houses

==== Social situation ====
- Population density: 45.2 residents per hectare
- 46.4% of residents say this ward is a "comfortably well-off" area (based on ACORN index)
- 2.9% of residents are on some form of benefits.
- 3.0% of households are classed as overcrowded.

=== Employment and education ===
==== Employment ====
- 67.9% are employed.
- 2.2% are unemployed.
- 1.7% are students.
- 28.2% are classed as "economically inactive".

==== Education ====
- 16.9% have no qualifications.
- 42.9% have only level 1 or 2 qualifications.
- 33.0% have level 3 qualifications or higher.

== Notable people ==
- George Formby Sr (1875–1921), British music hall comedian and father of George Formby, owned a house on London Road known as Hillcrest
- George Formby (1904–1961), British film and stage comedian and recording artist, famed for playing the ukulele and songs such as "When I'm Cleaning Windows", lived also at Hillcrest
- Bob Fulton (1947–2021), Australian rugby league footballer and coach, was born in Stockton Heath before moving to Australia at the age of four.
- Bob Shaw (1931–1996), science fiction writer, lived in the village at 98 London Road. His funeral wake was held at the Red Lion pub.
- Martin Roberts (born 1963), television presenter, grew up in the village.

== Freedom of the Parish ==
The following people and military units have received the Freedom of the Parish of Stockton Heath.

=== Individuals ===
- Sonia Boggan: 30 September 2021.
- Dorothy Robb: 30 September 2021.

- Celia Jordan: 25 September 2024. (Awarded Posthumously)

== See also ==
- Listed buildings in Stockton Heath
