= Whitley, Cheshire =

Civil parish in Cheshire, England

Coordinates: 53.316°N 2.573°W

Whitley
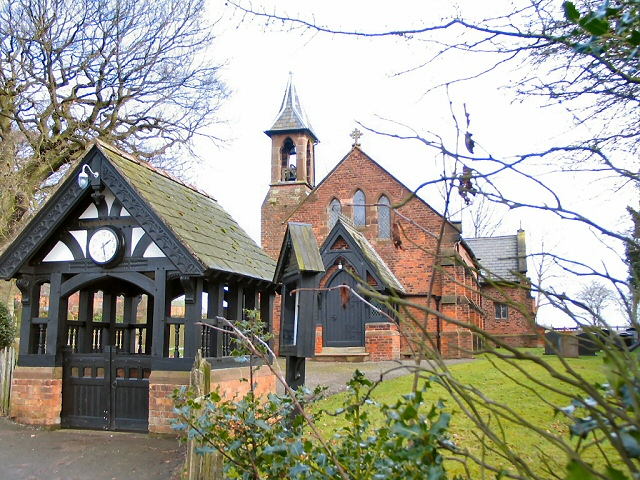
- St Luke's Church, Lower Whitley

- Location within Cheshire
- Population: 533 (2011)
- OS grid reference: SJ618800
- Unitary authority: Cheshire West and Chester
- Ceremonial county: Cheshire
- Region: North West
- Country: England
- Sovereign state: United Kingdom
- Post town: WARRINGTON
- Postcode district: WA4
- Dialling code: 01925 / 01606
- Police: Cheshire
- Fire: Cheshire
- Ambulance: North West
- UK Parliament: Tatton

Whitley is a village and civil parish in Cheshire, England, surrounded by Antrobus, Comberbach, Little Leigh and Dutton. It also borders Daresbury in Halton borough as well as Hatton and Stretton in Warrington borough.

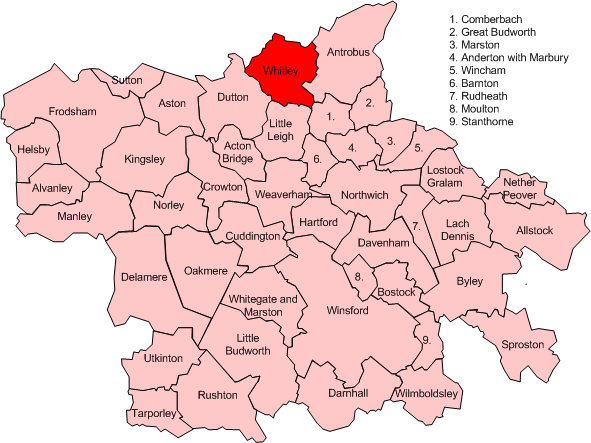
Map of civil parish of Whitley within the former borough of Vale Royal

Whitley lies mostly in the northern part of a triangle of land bounded by the A49 (Warrington to Whitchurch) to the west, the A559 (Warrington to Northwich) to the east and the A533 (Runcorn to Northwich) to the south.

== Transport ==
All public roads in the village are maintained by Cheshire West and Chester council. The A49 Tarporley Road is a single carriageway primary road (formerly a trunk road). Between the world wars the Lower Whitley By-Pass was constructed, the old route being called Street Lane. The A559 Northwich Road has always been a county road and is generally a narrower road. Just half a mile to the north of the parish is the M56 North Cheshire Motorway.

Buses run through the village from Warrington to Northwich and vice versa. These are operated by Warrington's Own Buses. In 2006 the services running through Weaverham and Little Leigh were discontinued. This means no bus services now run along the A49 through Whitley, though they still run on the A559.

== Public houses ==
Whitley has two public houses, the Chetwode Arms on Street Lane (the old A49) and the Birch and Bottle on Northwich Road. Both were owned by Greenall Whitley & Co until it moved away from pubs in the 1990s, as was a third pub, The Millstone on Grimsditch Lane, now closed.

== Education ==
Whitley Village School is a primary school providing infant and junior education for the children of Whitley and Dutton. Secondary education is currently provided by Weaverham High School. Previously it was in the catchment area of The County High School Leftwich (formerly Leftwich High School). Previously to this children went to Broomfields High School, now part of Bridgewater High School.

== Notable people ==
- Michelle Donelan, Conservative politician
- Colin Crompton

== See also ==
- St Luke's Church, Lower Whitley
