= Listed buildings in Walton, Cheshire =

Walton is a civil parish in the Borough of Warrington in Cheshire, England. It contains 22 buildings that are recorded in the National Heritage List for England as designated listed buildings. The parish is centred on Walton Hall, the former home of the Greenall family. The hall itself is listed, as are surrounding structures related to the hall. Also listed are the nearby parish church and its lychgate, and cottages and a former school in the Walton Hall Estate. The Bridgewater Canal runs through the parish; related to this are six listed structures, namely five bridges and an aqueduct. The other listed buildings are a former farmhouse dating from about 1800, a late 18th-century house, and an early 19th-century farmhouse. All the buildings are listed at Grade II, other than the parish church which is listed at Grade II*.

== Key ==
Grade	Criteria
Grade II*	Particularly important buildings of more than special interest.
Grade II	Buildings of national importance and special interest.

== Buildings ==
Name and location	Photograph	Date	Notes	Grade
Acton Grange Bridge; 53.35809°N 2.62064°W		c. 1770	This is a bridge carrying Holly Hedge Lane over the Bridgewater Canal. It was designed by James Brindley for the Duke of Bridgewater. The bridge is constructed in brick with stone dressings forming a segmental arch over the canal.	II
Walton Bridge; 53.36028°N 2.60730°W		c. 1770	The bridge carries Warrington Road over the Bridgewater Canal. It was designed by James Brindley for the Duke of Bridgewater. The bridge is constructed in brick with stone dressings forming a segmental arch over the canal.	II
Aqueduct; 53.35865°N 2.61165°W	—	c. 1770	This carries the Bridgewater Canal over the former Chester Road. The aqueduct was designed by James Brindley for the Duke of Bridgewater. It is constructed in brick with stone dressings forming a segmental arch over the lane.	II
Thomasons Bridge; 53.35845°N 2.61514°W		c. 1770	The bridge carries a farm road over the Bridgewater Canal. It was designed by James Brindley for the Duke of Bridgewater. The bridge is constructed in brick with stone dressings forming a segmental arch over the canal.	II
Houghs Bridge; 53.36180°N 2.59750°W		c. 1770	The bridge carries Hough's Lane over the Bridgewater Canal. It was designed by James Brindley for the Duke of Bridgewater. The bridge is constructed in brick with stone dressings forming a segmental arch over the canal.	II
Walton Lea Bridge; 53.36188°N 2.60207°W		c. 1770 (probable)	The bridge carries the drive from the lodge to Walton Hall over the Bridgewater Canal between Walton Lea Road to Walton Hall Park. It was designed by James Brindley for the Duke of Bridgewater. The bridge is constructed in brick with stone dressings forming a segmental arch over the canal, and has a parapet with recessed rectangular panels.	II
Walton House; 53.3688°N 2.5937°W	—	Late 18th century	The house is constructed in brick with slate roofs, and is in two storeys. It has an Ionic-style portico with two columns standing on a painted stone plinth. At the ends of the house are shaped gables, one of which contains a large oriel window. The other windows are sashes. Inside the house is ornamental plasterwork.	II
33 Chester Road; 53.3695°N 2.5963°W	—	c. 1800	This is a brick cottage with a slate roof in two storeys and three bays. It originated as a two-bay farmhouse with an attached shippon and hayloft. The windows are casements, and the arched entrance to the former shippon has been bricked up.	II
Walnut Tree Farmhouse; 53.3691°N 2.5979°W	—	Early 19th century	The farmhouse probably incorporates material dating from earlier than the 19th century. It is constructed in painted brick on a sandstone plinth with slate roofs. At the corners are stuccoed brick buttresses. The house is in two storeys, and has casement windows on the front, and sash windows at the rear.	II
Walton Hall; 53.3599°N 2.6023°W		1836–38	A country house for Sir Gilbert Greenall, it was extended for him in 1869–70 by Paley and Austin. It is constructed in brick with stone dressings and has slate roofs. The building is almost symmetrical, and has 2 1/2 storeys. Features include bay windows, crow-stepped gables, pinnacled buttresses, a two-storey porch, and a clock tower.	II
Bridge House; 53.3615°N 2.6022°W		1838	Originally built as a school house and a schoolmaster's house for the Walton Hall Estate, later converted into two houses. They are in brick on projecting sandstone plinths, with gabled slate roofs. They have brick chimneys with octagonal flues, and form a T-shaped block. The former school house is in two storeys with an attic. The former schoolmaster's house has a projecting gabled porch with a Jacobean-style doorway, and gabled half-dormers. The windows are mullioned and transomed.	II
Lodge, Walton Hall; 53.3652°N 2.6030°W	—	c. 1838	The former lodge is sited at the entrance to the drive of Walton Lea Crematorium. It is an asymmetrical single-storey building with a T-shaped plan, constructed in brick with sandstone dressings and Westmorland slate roofs. Features include a mullioned oriel window, a gabled porch, and sandstone finials on the gables of the lodge.	II
Gates, gatepiers and screens, Walton Hall Lodge; 53.36518°N 2.60315°W	—	c. 1838	The gates are in wrought iron, with the gate piers, their caps and ball finials in rusticated sandstone. The screens are S-shaped, and consist of wrought iron railings on a sandstone wall, with piers in the centres and at the outer ends.	II
Wall, balustrades and steps, Walton Hall; 53.35956°N 2.60155°W		c. 1838 (probable)	The wall, balustrades and steps are in sandstone and located between the lawns to the east of the hall. The wall is in two parts, separated by three steps, and surmounted by urn-shaped balusters.	II
St John the Evangelist's Church; 53.3626°N 2.6049°W		1882–83	The church was designed by Paley and Austin, and paid for by Sir Gilbert Greenall. It is in Decorated style, and constructed in sandstone with Westmorland green slate roofs. The church has a cruciform plan, with a large central tower decorated with chequerwork and surmounted by an octagonal spire.	II*
134 Chester Road and Village Hall; 53.36223°N 2.6063°W		1885	Built for Sir Gilbert Greenall as a school and attached schoolmaster's house. The school has been converted into the village hall. The building is in brick with stone dressings and Westmorland green slate roofs. On the ridge is a brick and stone chimney with six attached octagonal flues. The hall has three-light windows with pointed heads, and at its end is a coped sandstone gable. The house is in two storeys and two bays, with gables on the front and ends. Its windows are mullioned.	II
Lychgate, St John the Evangelist's Church; 53.3625°N 2.6057°W		c. 1885	The lychgate at the entrance to the churchyard was designed by Paley and Austin for Sir Gilbert Greenall. It is constructed in red sandstone with a Westmorland green slate roof and half-timbered gables on brackets.	II
138 and 138A Chester Road; 53.3619°N 2.6068°W		c. 1910	A pair of cottages forming part of the estate village built for Sir Gilbert Greenall, junior. They are in two storeys, the lower storey being in red sandstone on a projecting plinth, and the upper storey half-timbered and jettied. The roofs are in Westmorland slate. Both cottages have oriel windows, and no. 138A also has a canted mullioned bay window.	II
140–146 Chester Road; 53.3618°N 2.6071°W		c. 1910	A terrace of four cottages forming part of the estate village built for Sir Gilbert Greenall, junior. They are constructed in sandstone and pebbledash and have Westmorland slate gabled roofs. The cottages are in 1 1/2 storeys. On the front are three gabled dormers and one canted bay window. Above the doors are small round windows. At the rear are casement windows.	II
131 and 133 Chester Road; 53.3619°N 2.6062°W		1912	A pair of cottages forming part of the estate village built for Sir Gilbert Greenall, junior. They are in brick on a sandstone plinth with sandstone dressings, stone-slate roofs, and large brick chimneys. The cottages have two storeys, and each is in two bays. The windows are mullioned and have leaded glazing.	II
135 Chester Road; 53.3616°N 2.6065°W		1912	A pair of cottages forming part of the estate village built for Sir Gilbert Greenall, junior. They are in brick on a sandstone plinth with sandstone dressings, stone-slate roofs, and large brick chimneys. The cottages form a V-shaped block. Each cottage is in two bays, with shaped gables. The windows are leaded casements.	II
3 and 5 Walton Lea Road; 53.3616°N 2.6059°W		1912	A pair of cottages forming part of the estate village built for Sir Gilbert Greenall, junior. They are in brick on a sandstone plinth with sandstone dressings, stone-slate roofs, and large brick chimneys. The cottages have two storeys, and each is in two bays. The windows are mullioned and have leaded glazing.	II
