= Hatton, Warrington =

Civil parish in Cheshire, England

Coordinates: 53.338°N 2.604°W

Hatton
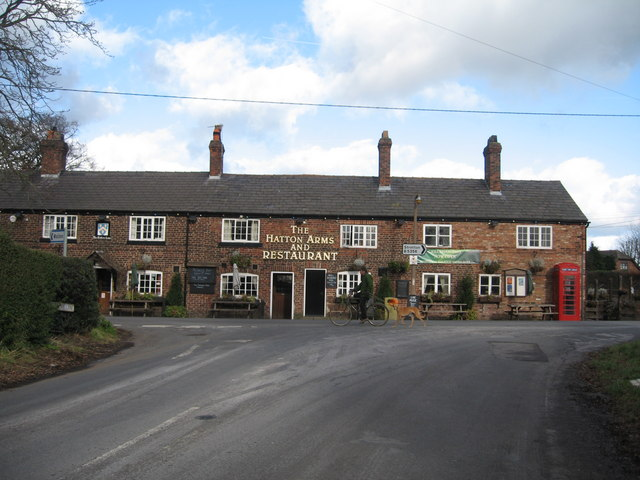
- The Hatton Arms public house, Hatton

- Location within Cheshire
- OS grid reference: SJ597825
- Civil parish: Hatton
- Unitary authority: Warrington
- Ceremonial county: Cheshire
- Region: North West
- Country: England
- Sovereign state: United Kingdom
- Post town: WARRINGTON
- Postcode district: WA4
- Dialling code: 01925
- Police: Cheshire
- Fire: Cheshire
- Ambulance: North West
- UK Parliament: Warrington South

Hatton is a civil parish and hamlet in the Borough of Warrington, Cheshire, England, located to the south of Warrington town centre.

It lies on the B5356 road between the villages of Daresbury and Stretton. It has one public house, The Hatton Arms. This is a Grade II listed building which formerly incorporated a post office and a village store. Two other listed buildings are Hatton Hall and a K6 telephone kiosk designed by Giles Gilbert Scott.

== See also ==
- Listed buildings in Hatton, Warrington
