= Statue of Saint Christopher, Norton Priory =

Late medieval English religious statue

Statue of Saint Christopher
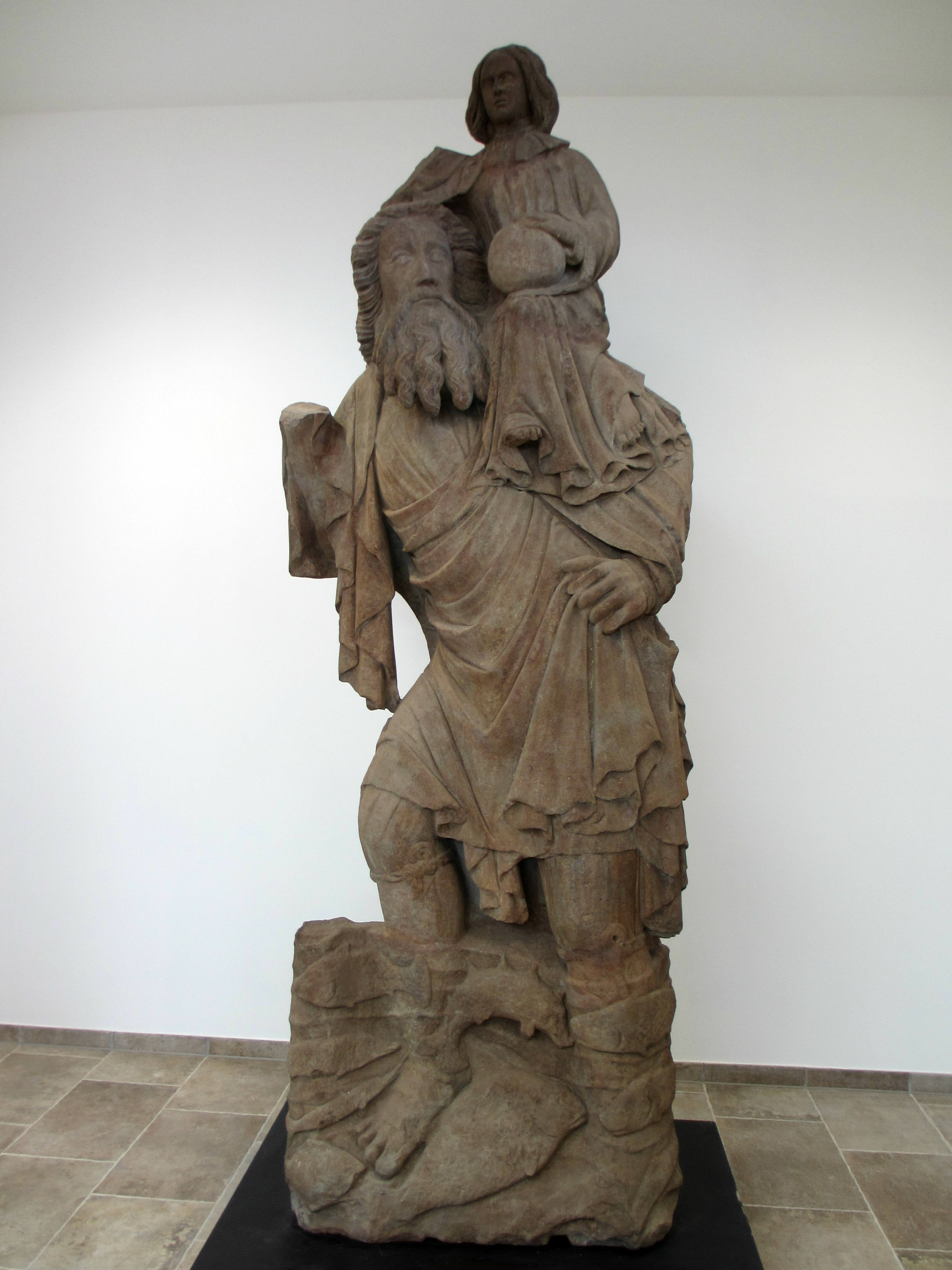
- Statue of Saint Christopher, Norton Priory
- Year: 14th century
- Medium: Red sandstone
- Subject: Saint Christopher
- Dimensions: 3.37 m × 0.4 m (11.1 ft × 1.3 ft)
- Weight: 1.25 tonnes
- Location: Norton Priory; Runcorn

The Statue of Saint Christopher stands in the museum at Norton Priory, Runcorn, Cheshire, England. It is a large statue of Saint Christopher created towards the end of the 14th century and is a rare survival of a religious sculpture from late medieval England. After the Dissolution of the Monasteries the sculpture was owned by the Brooke family and stood originally in the outer courtyard of their house, and later in the garden. When the Brooke family left the site, the statue remained and, in a damaged condition, it was given to National Museums Liverpool in 1964. It has been restored and is housed in the museum on the site of the priory.

== Description ==
The statue is carved from red sandstone and is twice life-size, standing 3.37 metres (11.1 ft) high. It weighs 1.25 tonnes and is the largest surviving medieval statue of St Christopher in Britain. The statue depicts St Christopher carrying Christ, as a child, on his left shoulder, walking through water that contains fish; the saint is wearing medieval clothes. It does not have the full thickness of a statue and is rather a carving in relief, having a maximum depth of 0.4 metres (1.3 ft). It was created in three pieces, one of which is now missing. The main piece is the section above the saint's knees and it includes the Christ child. The smaller piece is the base, consisting of the saint's lower legs and the river. The missing piece would have fitted into a hollow on the saint's right side. The right arm of the saint and the Christ child's right arm are missing. It is likely that the Christ child's arm would have been raised in benediction, and the saint's arm would have carried a staff. The Christ child's head is not original, having been replaced in the 17th century. There is a break running from the saint's forehead to below Christ's knee. The details of the carving remain fine, with little weathering. The depictions of the fish are sufficiently realistic for the species of all but one to be identified; the species identified are garfish, pike, mullet, carp or bream, and plaice or flounder. Fragments of paint remaining on the surface show that the statue was originally brightly coloured, with a vermilion cloak, naturally coloured skin, and a grey beard. Traces of wax are also present, some of them overlaid by particles of blue-green paint.

== History ==
The statue has been dated on stylistic grounds to have been produced between 1375 and 1400. The status of the foundation at Norton was raised from that of a priory to a mitred abbey in 1391, and it has been suggested by J. Patrick Greene, the director of the excavations in the 1970s and 1980s, that the statue may have been commissioned as a result of this. The priory was dedicated to Saint Mary, and when its status was raised to that of an abbey, Saint Christopher was adopted as a subsidiary patron saint. The sandstone was probably obtained from a quarry 1 mile (2 km) from the priory at Windmill Hill. It is likely that the statue was carved at the priory, but the identity of the sculptor is not known. The original position of the statue in the priory is uncertain. Greene suggested that it stood in the outer courtyard of the priory, where it is shown in a print dated 1727. However, Marrow argued that it was probably originally placed at the west end of the abbey church. He supports this by the fact that statues of Saint Christopher were sited at the west end of Notre Dame in Paris and the church in Terrington St Clement, Norfolk. He also says that the crispness of the carving is consistent with the statue having been indoors for part of its existence.

The Reformation was a period in which religious sculpture was attacked or destroyed, although some items survived because they were hidden and orders to destroy them were disobeyed. At the end of this period "no more than a tiny fraction of such medieval sculpture remained". The survival of this statue is considered to be "extraordinary". Norton Priory was one of the first monasteries to be closed in the Dissolution of the Monasteries. However, while movable objects and materials were taken away, the statue, being "colossal and fragile" and probably built into the structure of the abbey, remained until the abbey and manor were sold to Sir Richard Brooke in 1545. At some time it was moved, because in a print of 1727 it is shown outside the buildings in a courtyard. The head of the Christ child was probably broken off during the Reformation, and its replacement is dated stylistically to between 1660 and 1685. It is known that the statue was on view in 1636 because reference is made to it in a poem of that date, Iter Lancastrense, by Rev Richard James.

At some stage the medieval paint was removed. John Larson, who carried out conservation work on the statue, is of the opinion that it was removed deliberately at some time before about 1660 and a coat of wax, probably beeswax, was applied to give it a plainer and a "uniform dull brown appearance". This may have made it "less offensive to Reformers". No wax was found on the replacement head of the Christ child. After the Restoration the statue was on display at the priory. A print of Norton Priory by the Buck Brothers dated 1727 shows the statue displayed in front of the house in the outer courtyard. A sketch plan drawn by a member of the Randle Holme family of Chester at some time between 1664 and 1678 shows that statue was already in this position at this earlier date. Although it was outside the house, it stood against a wall and was sheltered to a degree by the overhanging upper storey; this would have given it some protection from weathering. At some time between 1727 and 1757 the old house was demolished and it was replaced by a new house in neoclassical style. The statue was moved into the garden, and it is likely that the blue-green paint was applied around this time to give it the appearance of a bronze garden sculpture. A visitor's guide to Runcorn published in 1834 states "In the garden [of Norton Priory] is an antique gigantic figure of St. Christopher".

The Brooke family left Norton Priory in 1921, leaving the statue behind. The house was demolished in 1928, apart from a section of wall to which the statue was bolted. By the 1960s, the statue had sunk into the ground and was damaged. In 1964 it was given to Liverpool Museum, now part of National Museums Liverpool, and removed from the priory site because of worries about its security. In the 1990s it was taken to the National Conservation Centre in Liverpool where it underwent conservation and cleaning, including removal of the blue-green paint. After work lasting three years it was returned to Norton Priory in September 1999. The statue is on loan to Norton Priory Museum Trust until 2049.

== Iconography and the cult of Saint Christopher ==
The name Christopher means "Christ-bearer". Saint Christopher was one of the most popular saints in the late medieval period and the cult based on him was derived from legends dating from the 5th century and later. It is possible that there was a person called Christopher who was martyred between 249 and 251. However, because of doubts about historical authenticity the cult came in for criticism during the Reformation. The saint's late medieval popularity derived largely from a version of the story published in 1275 in the Golden Legend by Jacobus de Voragine, in which a giant named Christopher helped travellers across a dangerous river and, when he planted his staff in the riverbank, it burst into leaf. In addition it was believed that seeing an image of the saint would protect from sudden death that day; this would have been particularly persuasive after the Black Death of 1348–49. The statue at Norton Priory was "created not as a work of art but as a practical working image with a religious purpose". Images of Saint Christopher are found in three poses. In the first pose the saint stands holding a staff in one hand and the Christ child in the other. The second pose, that adopted by the Norton Priory statue, shows the saint with a staff in one hand; the other hand rests on his hip and the Christ child sits on his shoulder. The third version shows the saint walking, holding the staff with both hands, and the Christ child either kneels behind his neck or sits with one leg on each side of his neck.

The association between Saint Christopher and Norton Priory is probably the result of the priory's proximity to the River Mersey. The priory stood 3 miles (5 km) from the Runcorn ferry where it crossed the river near Runcorn Gap. The priory had an obligation to be hospitable to travellers, and the saint is the patron saint of travellers. In addition the priory received one tenth of the profits from the ferry. In 1331 priory lands had been damaged by flooding, and Greene suggested that the saint might "also have been regarded as a protector against a repeat of the floods".

== Critique ==
Experts comment on the quality of the carving, the general condition of the sculpture, and the rareness of survival of such objects. Comments include the following. The statue is "one of the very few representatives in Britain of the genre of colossal religious figural sculpture, and it is in outstanding condition". It is "one of the few remaining British examples of colossal religious figurative sculpture, and remains in outstanding condition despite the upheavals of the 16th and 17th centuries." The art historian Phillip Lindley describes the statue as "the work of a sculptor whose mastery of this rather unpromising material is such that his figure need not fear comparison with almost any sculpture of its period in England. It is a work of national and even international significance, one of the most important pieces of late medieval sculpture to survive from the north of England ...It is an extremely rare survival of gigantic sculpture from late medieval England, since there are no other sculpted English images of this saint to set against the great continental survivors ..."

== Recent and current display ==
Between September 2001 and March 2002 the statue was on display at Tate Britain in its exhibition of medieval sculpture entitled Image and Idol: Medieval Sculpture. The statue has since been on display in Norton Priory Museum.

A copy of the statue, made of polystyrene, was used in the Julian Fellowes film From Time to Time (2009), based on the children's book The Chimneys of Green Knowe by Lucy Boston; the statue (and manifestation) of St Christopher feature in Boston's book.

== See also ==
- History of Cheshire
- List of monastic houses in Cheshire
