= Norton Priory =

Historic site in Norton, Runcorn, Cheshire, England

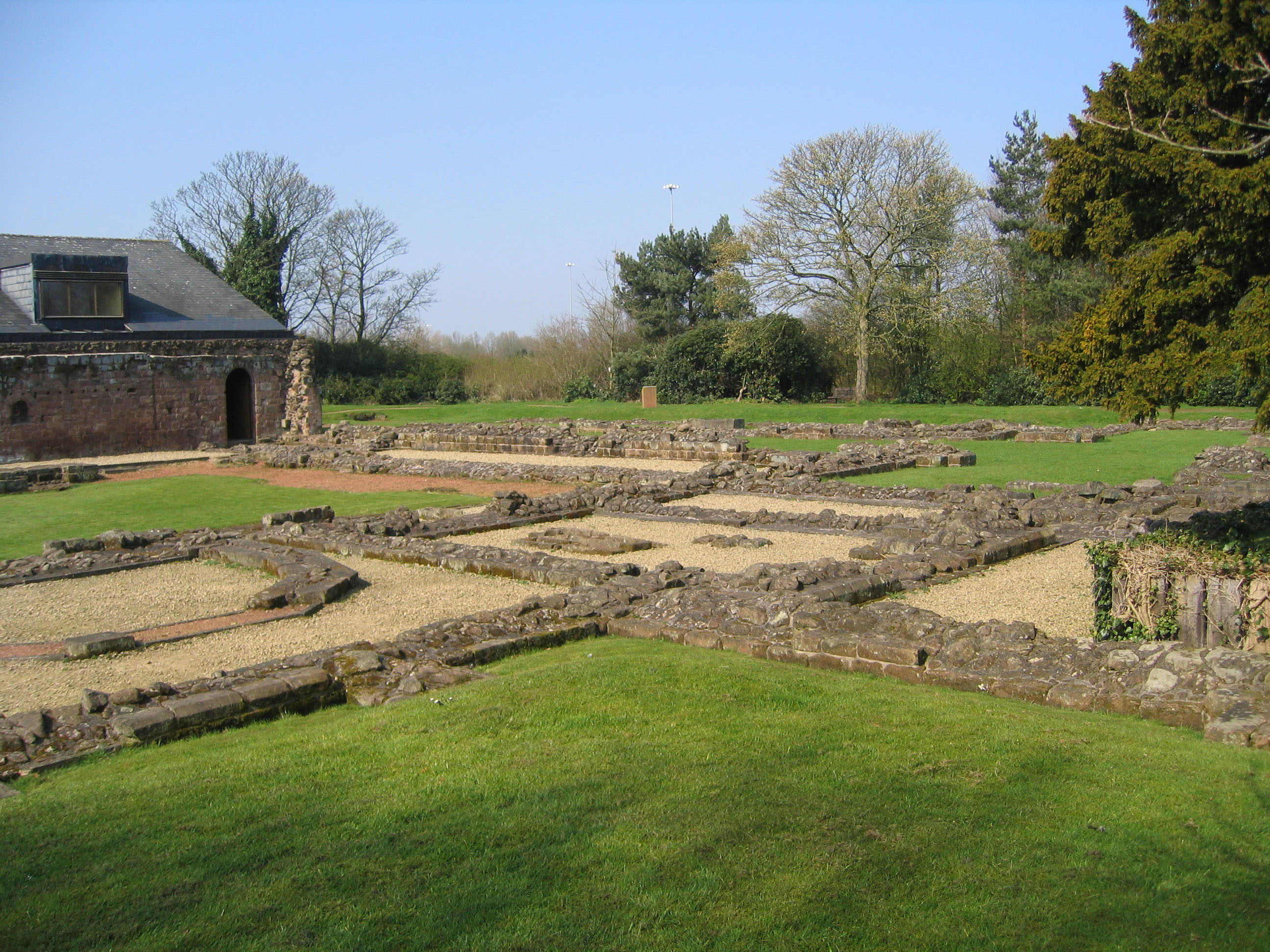
- Foundations of the monastic buildings, and the back of the museum at left
- Interactive map of Norton Priory

Monastery information
- Order: Augustinian
- Established: 1115
- Disestablished: 1536
- Dedication: Saint Bertelin, Saint Mary
- Diocese: Diocese of Coventry and Lichfield
- Controlled churches: Runcorn, Great Budworth, St Michael, Chester, Castle Donington, Ratcliffe-on-Soar, Kneesall, Burton upon Stather, Pirton (now Pyrton)

People
- Founders: William fitz Nigel, 2nd Baron of Halton

Site
- Location: Norton, Runcorn, Cheshire, England
- Coordinates: 53.3423°N 2.6799°W
- Grid reference: SJ548830
- Visible remains: Yes
- Public access: Yes
- Website: nortonpriory.org

Scheduled monument
- Designated: 24 July 1928
- Reference no.: 1015603

Listed Building – Grade I
- Designated: 23 April 1970
- Reference no.: 1130433

Norton Priory is a historic site in Norton, Runcorn, Cheshire, England, comprising the remains of an abbey complex dating from the 12th to 16th centuries, and an 18th-century country house; it is now a museum. The remains are a scheduled ancient monument and are recorded in the National Heritage List for England as a designated Grade I listed building. They are considered to be the most important monastic remains in Cheshire.

The priory was established as an Augustinian foundation in the 12th century, and was raised to the status of an abbey in 1391. The abbey was closed in 1536, as part of the dissolution of the monasteries. Nine years later the surviving structures, together with the manor of Norton, were purchased by Sir Richard Brooke, who built a Tudor house on the site, incorporating part of the abbey. This was replaced in the 18th century by a Georgian house. The Brooke family left the house in 1921, and it was partially demolished in 1928. In 1966 the site was given in trust for the use of the general public.

Excavation of the site began in 1971, and became the largest to be carried out by modern methods on any European monastic site. It revealed the foundations and lower parts of the walls of the monastery buildings and the abbey church. Important finds included: a Norman doorway; a finely carved arcade; a floor of mosaic tiles, the largest floor area of this type to be found in any modern excavation; the remains of the kiln where the tiles were fired; a bell casting pit used for casting the bell; and a large medieval statue of Saint Christopher.

The priory was opened to the public as a visitor attraction in the 1970s. The 42-acre site, run by an independent charitable trust, includes a museum, the excavated ruins, and the surrounding garden and woodland. In 1984 the separate walled garden was redesigned and opened to the public. Norton Priory offers a programme of events, exhibitions, educational courses, and outreach projects. In August 2016, a larger and much extended museum opened.

== History ==
=== Priory ===
In 1115 a community of Augustinian canons was founded in the burh of Runcorn by William fitz Nigel, the second Baron of Halton and Constable of Chester, on the south bank of the River Mersey where it narrows to form the Runcorn Gap. This was the only practical site where the Mersey could be crossed between Warrington and Birkenhead, and the archaeologists Fraser Brown and Christine Howard-Davis consider it likely that the canons cared for travellers and pilgrims crossing the river. They also speculate that William may have sought to profit from the tolls paid by these travellers.

The priory was the second religious house to be founded in the Earldom of Chester; the first was the Benedictine St Werburgh's Abbey at Chester, founded in 1093 by Hugh Lupus, the first Earl of Chester. The priory at Runcorn had a double dedication, to Saint Bertelin and to Saint Mary. The authors of the Victoria County History suggest that the dedication to St Bertelin was taken from a Saxon church already existing on the site. In 1134 William fitz William, the third Baron of Halton, moved the priory to a site in Norton, a village 3 miles (5 km) to the east of Runcorn. The reasons for the move are uncertain. It may have been that fitz William wanted greater control of the strategic crossing of the Mersey at Runcorn Gap, or it may have been because the canons wanted a more secluded site. Nothing remains of the site of the original priory in Runcorn.

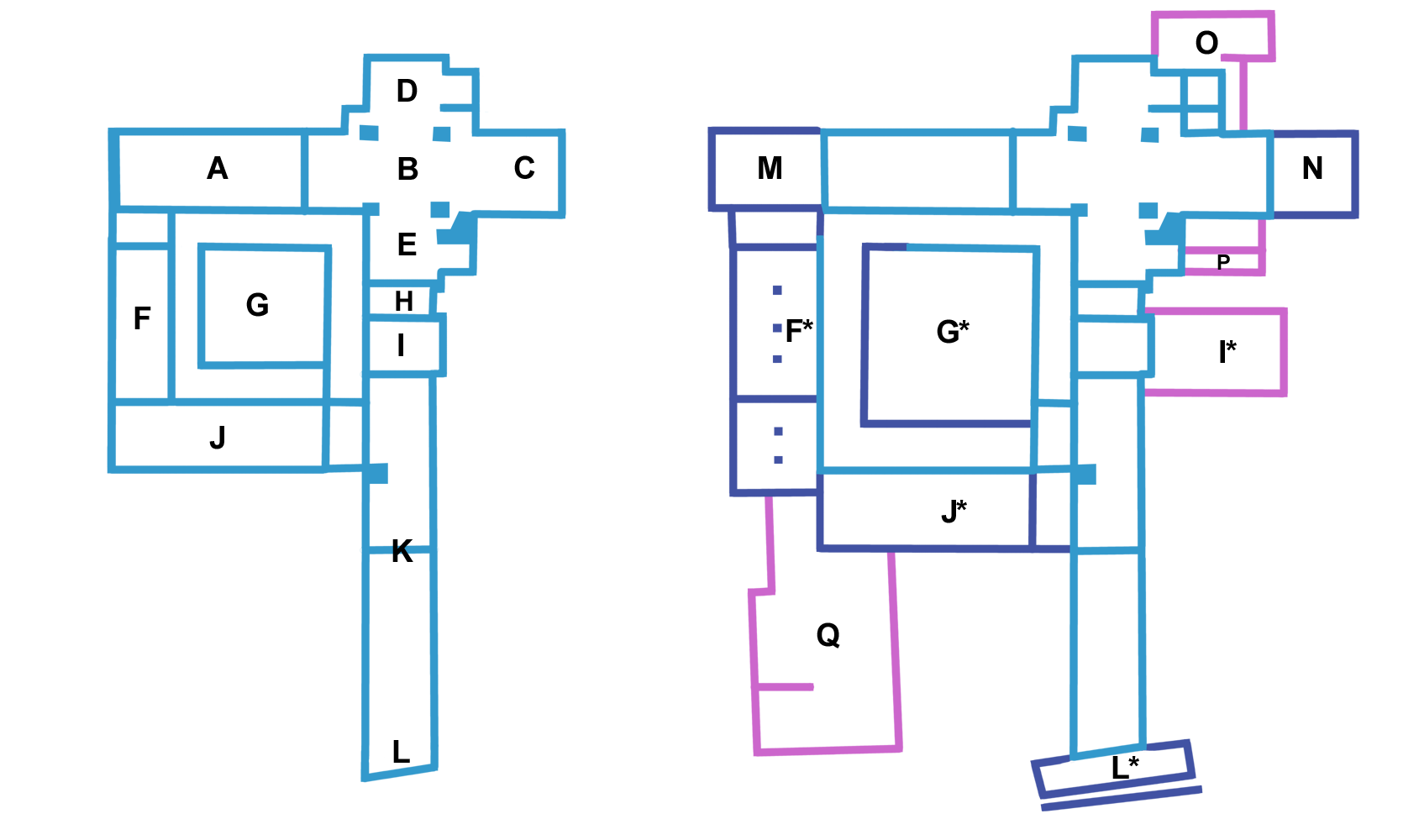
Plan of the priory in the 12th century (left) and 13th century (right). early 12th century late 12th century early–mid 13th century: A: nave; B: choir; C: chancel; D: north transept; E: south transept; F: cellarer's range; G: cloister; H: sacristy; I: chapter house; J: refectory; K: dormitory; L: latrines; M: extended west front; N: extended chancel; O: north chapel; P: south chapel; Q: kitchens; Asterisk: buildings of similar function in a different later location

The site for the new priory was in damp, scrubby woodland. There is no evidence that it was agricultural land, or that it contained any earlier buildings. The first priority was to clear and drain the land. There were freshwater springs near the site, and these would have provided fresh running water for latrines and domestic purposes. They would also have been used to create watercourses and moated enclosures, some of which might have been used for orchards and herb gardens. Sandstone for building the priory was available at an outcrop nearby, sand for mortar could be obtained from the shores of the River Mersey, and boulder clay on the site provided material for floor and roof tiles.

Excavation has revealed remnants of oak, some of it from trees hundreds of years old. It is likely that this came from various sources; some from nearby, and some donated from the forests at Delamere and Macclesfield. The church and monastic buildings were constructed in Romanesque style.

The priory was endowed by William fitz Nigel with properties in Cheshire, Lancashire, Nottinghamshire, Lincolnshire and Oxfordshire, including the churches of St Mary, Great Budworth and St Michael, Chester. By 1195 the priory owned eight churches, five houses, the tithe of at least eight mills, the rights of common in four townships, and one-tenth of the profits from the Runcorn ferry. The prior supplied the chaplain to the hereditary Constables of Chester and to the Barons of Halton.

During the 12th century, the main benefactors of the priory were the Barons of Halton, but after 1200 their gifts reduced, mainly because they transferred their interests to the Cistercian abbey at Stanlow, which had been founded in 1178 by John fitz Richard, the sixth baron. Archaeologist J. Patrick Greene states that it is unlikely that any of the Barons of Halton were buried in Norton Priory. The only members of the family known to be buried there are Richard, brother of Roger de Lacy, the seventh baron, and a female named Alice. The identity of Alice has not been confirmed, but Greene considers that she was the niece of William, Earl Warenne, the 5th Earl of Surrey and therefore a relative of the Delacy family, who were at that time the Barons of Halton. The earl made a grant to the priory of 30 shillings a year in order to "maintain a pittance for her soul". As the role played by the Barons of Halton declined, so the importance of members of the Dutton family increased. The Duttons had been benefactors since the priory's foundation, and from the 13th century they became the principal benefactors. There were two main branches of the family, one in Dutton and the other in Sutton Weaver. The Dutton family had their own burial chapel in the priory, and burial in the chapel is specified in three wills made by members of the family. The Aston family of Aston were also important benefactors.

The priory buildings, including the church, were extended during the late 12th and early 13th centuries. It has been estimated that the original community would have consisted of 12 canons and the prior; this increased to around 26 members in the later part of the 12th century, making it one of the largest houses in the Augustinian order. By the end of the century the church had been lengthened, a new and larger chapter house had been built (I* on the plan), and a large chapel had been added to the east end of the church (N). In about 1200 the west front of the church was enlarged (M), a bell tower was built and guest quarters were constructed. It is possible that the chapel at the east end was built to accommodate the holy cross of Norton, a relic which was reputed to have miraculous healing powers. A fire in 1236 destroyed the timber-built kitchen (Q) and damaged the west range of the monastic buildings and the roof of the church. The kitchen was rebuilt and the other damage was rapidly repaired.

=== Abbey ===
During the first half of the 14th century, the priory suffered from financial mismanagement and disputes with the Dutton family, exacerbated by a severe flood in 1331 that reduced the income from the priory's lands. The direct effects of the Black Death are not known, but during the 1350s financial problems continued. These were party mitigated with the selling of the advowson of the church at Ratcliffe-on-Soar. Matters further improved from 1366 with the appointment of Richard Wyche as prior. He was active in the governance of the wider Augustinian order and in political affairs, and in 1391 was involved in raising the priory's status to that of a mitred abbey. A mitred abbey was one in which the abbot was given permission to use pontifical insignia, including the mitre, ring and pontifical staff, and to give the solemn benediction provided a bishop was not present. It was rare for an Augustinian house to be elevated to this status. Out of about 200 Augustinian houses in England and Wales, 28 were abbeys and only seven of these became mitred. The only other mitred abbey in Cheshire was that of St Werburgh in Chester. In 1379 and in 1381 there were 15 canons at Norton and in 1401 there were 16, making it the largest Augustinian community in the northwest of England. By this time the barony of Halton had passed by a series of marriages to the duchy of Lancaster. John of Gaunt, the 1st Duke of Lancaster and 14th Baron of Halton, agreed to be the patron of the newly formed abbey. At this date the church was 287 feet (87 m) long; it was the second longest Augustinian church in northwest England, exceeded only by the 328 feet (100 m) long church at Carlisle. Towards the end of the 14th century, the abbey acquired a "giant" statue of Saint Christopher. Three wills from members of the Dutton family from this period survive; they are dated 1392, 1442 and 1527, and in each will money was bequeathed to the foundation.

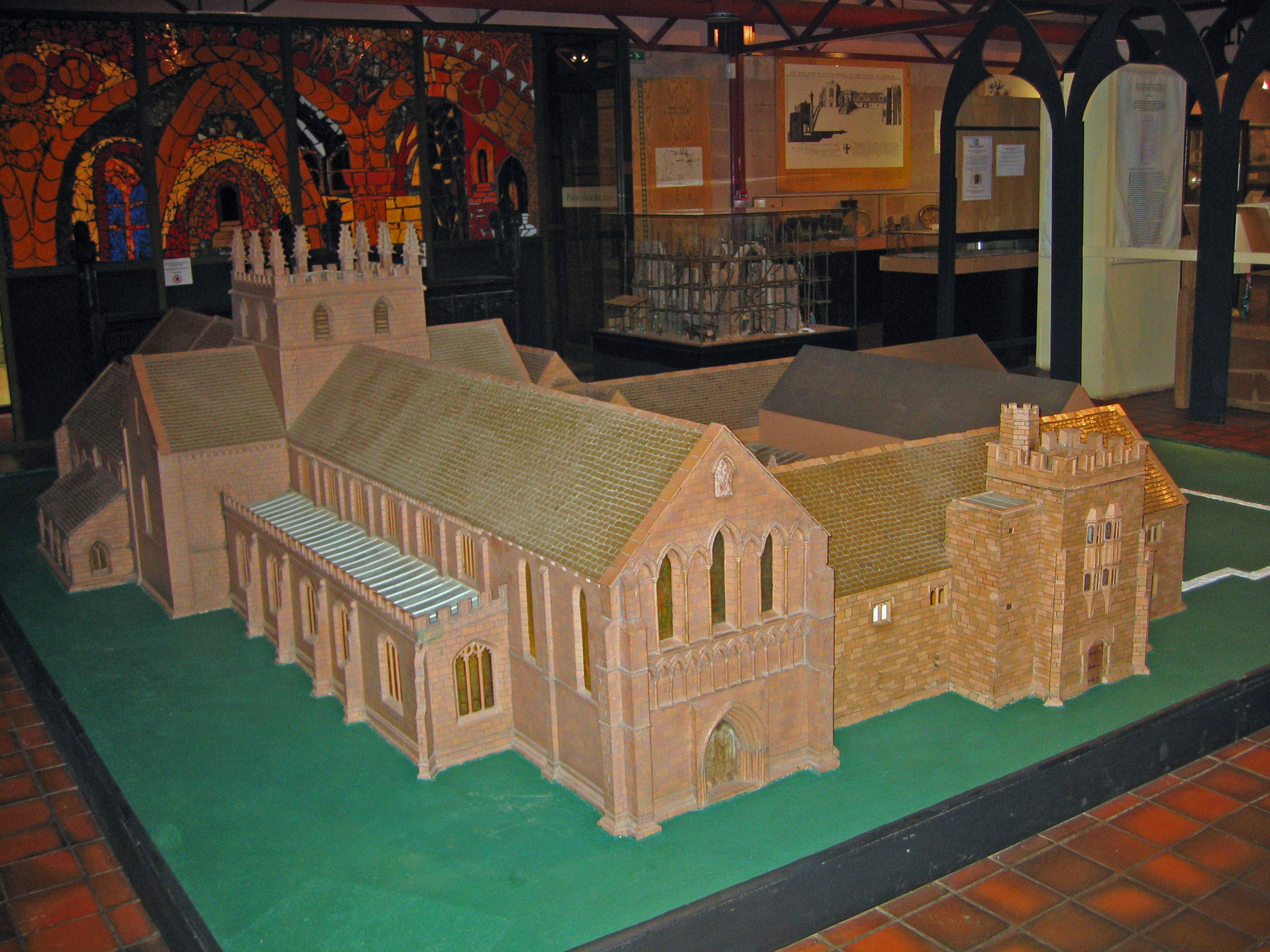
Model of the abbey as it is thought it would have appeared in the 16th century

The abbey's fortunes went into decline after the death of Richard Wyche in 1400. Wyche was succeeded by his prior, John Shrewsbury, who "does not seem to have done more than keep the house in order". Frequent floods had reduced its income, and in 1429 the church and other abbey buildings were described as being "ruinous". Problems continued through the rest of the 15th century, resulting in the sale of more advowsons. By 1496 the number of canons had been reduced to nine, and to seven in 1524. In 1522 there were reports of disputes between the abbot and the prior. The abbot was accused of "wasting the house's resources, nepotism, relations with women" and other matters, while the prior admitted to "fornication and lapses in the observation of the Rule". The prior threatened the abbot with a knife, but then left the abbey. The physical state of the buildings continued to deteriorate.

The records of the priory and abbey have not survived, but the excavations and the study of other documents have produced evidence of how the monastic lands were managed. The principal source of income came from farming. This income was required not only for the building and upkeep of the property, but also for feeding the canons, their guests, and visiting pilgrims. The priory also had an obligation from its foundation to house travellers fording the Mersey. It has been estimated that nearly half of the demesne lands were used for arable farming. The grain grown on priory lands was ground by a local windmill and by a watermill outside the priory lands. Excavations revealed part of a stone handmill in the area used in the monastic kitchen. In addition to orchards and herb gardens in the moated enclosures, it is likely that beehives were maintained for the production of honey. There is evidence from bone fragments that cattle, sheep, pigs, geese and chickens were reared and consumed, but few bone fragments from deer, rabbits or hares have been discovered. Horseflesh was not eaten. Although few fish bones have been discovered, it is known from documentary evidence that the canons owned a number of local fisheries. The fuel used consisted of wood and charcoal, and turf from marshes over which the priory had rights of turbary (to cut turf).

The events in 1536 surrounding the fate of the abbey at the dissolution of the monasteries are complicated, and included a dispute between Sir Piers Dutton, who was in a powerful position as the Sheriff of Cheshire, and Sir William Brereton, the deputy-chamberlain of Chester. Dutton's estate was next to that of the abbey, and Dutton plotted to gain some of its land from the Crown after the dissolution; while Brereton supported the abbot against Dutton and held the lucrative position of steward of the abbey. A campaign of vilification was directed at the canons, asserting that they were guilty of "debauched conduct". Then, in 1535, Dutton falsely accused the abbot and Brereton of issuing counterfeit coins. This charge was dismissed mainly because one of Dutton's witnesses was considered to be "unconvincing". Playing into Duttons' hands was the gross undervaluation of the abbey's assets as reported to the royal commissioners of the Valor Ecclesiasticus of 1535; as a result of which the net annual income of the abbey was recorded, falsely, as falling below the £200 (equivalent to £150,000 in 2025) threshold that would subsequently be chosen for the first round of dissolutions in 1536, although whether this subterfuge was due to the machinations of Dutton or the abbot (or both) remains unclear. Brereton and the abbot appear to have attempted to have the dissolution cancelled subject to the payment of a fine, as was the case in large numbers of other houses in similar circumstances; but in the abbot's absence dissolution commissioners arrived unannounced at the abbey in early October 1536. There was considerable opposition, the commissioners being menaced by around 300 local people; for whom the abbot, rushing back, threw an impromptu feast complete with roasted ox. According to Dutton's account, after barricading themselves in a tower the commissioners managed to send a letter to Dutton, who arrived with a force of men in the middle of the night. Most of the rioters fled, but Dutton arrested the abbot and four of the canons, who were sent to Halton Castle and then to prison in Chester. Dutton sent a report of the events to Henry VIII; who demanded that if the abbot and canons had behaved as Dutton reported, they should be immediately executed as traitors. However, because the kings instructions had been conveyed by the Lord Chancellor in the form of letters to both Dutton and Brereton, the two faction leaders would be required to act together to effect them; with the consequence that Brereton was temporarily able to stall any such action by refusing to meet with Dutton. Events elsewhere in the country further delayed the execution and, following an intercession to Thomas Cromwell (whose own informal contacts had cast doubt on the reliability of Dutton's reports), the abbot and canons were discharged and awarded pensions. The abbey was made uninhabitable, the lead from the roof, the bell metal, and other valuable materials were confiscated for the king, and the building lay empty for nine years. The estate came into the ownership of the Crown, and it was managed by Brereton. From the evidence of damage to the tiled floor of the church, Brown and Howard-Davis conclude it is likely that the church was demolished at an early stage, but otherwise the archaeological evidence for this period is sparse and largely negative.

=== Country house ===
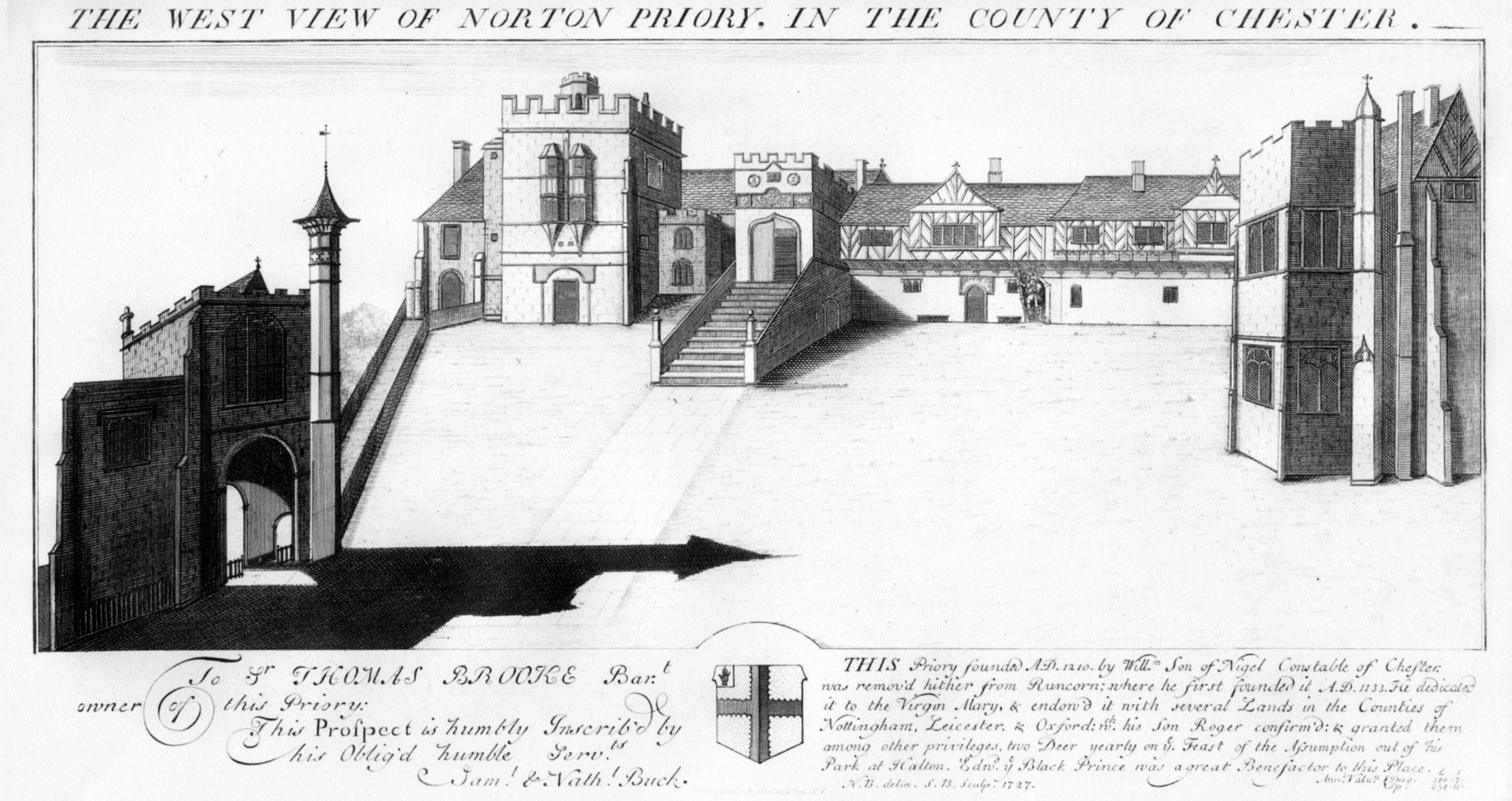
Engraving of the Tudor house from the west by the Buck brothers, dated 1727

In 1545 the abbey and the manor of Norton were sold to Sir Richard Brooke for a little over £1,512 (equivalent to £870,000 in 2025). Brooke built a house in Tudor style, which became known as Norton Hall, using as its core the former abbot's lodgings and the west range of the monastic buildings. It is not certain which other monastic buildings remained when the abbey was bought by the Brookes; excavations suggest that the cloisters were still present. A 17th-century sketch plan by one of the Randle Holme family shows that the gatehouse remained at that time, although almost all the church had been demolished. An engraving by the Buck brothers dated 1727 shows that little changed by the next century.

During the Civil War the house was attacked by a force of Royalists. The Brookes were the first family in north Cheshire to declare allegiance to the Parliamentary side. Halton Castle was a short distance away, and was held by Earl Rivers for the Royalists. In February 1643 a large force from the castle armed with cannon attacked the house, which was defended by only 80 men. Henry Brooke successfully defended the house, with only one man wounded, while the Royalists lost 16 men including their cannonier (gunner). They burnt two barns and plundered Brooke's tenants, but "returned home with shame and the hatred of the country".

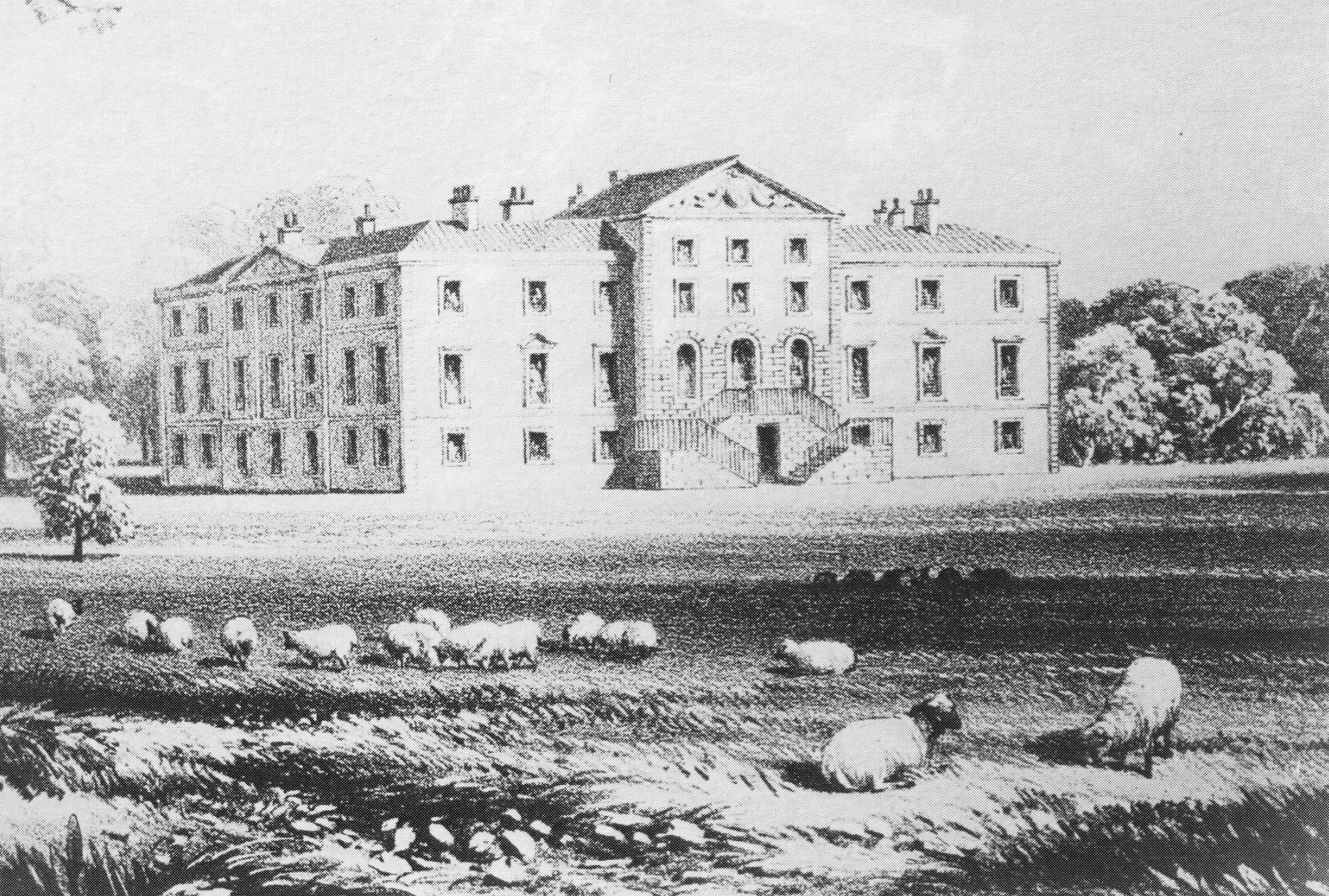
Georgian house before 1868

At some time between 1727 and 1757 the Tudor house was demolished and replaced by a new house in Georgian style. The house had an L-plan, the main wing facing west standing on the footprint of the Tudor house, with a south wing at right-angles to it. The ground floor of the west wing retained the former vaulted undercroft of the west range of the medieval abbey, and contained the kitchens and areas for the storage of wines and beers. The first floor was the piano nobile, containing the main reception rooms. The west front was symmetrical, in three storeys, with a double flight of stairs leading up to the main entrance. Clearance of the other surviving remnants of the monastic buildings had started but the moated enclosures were still in existence at that time. A drawing dated 1770 shows that by then all these buildings and the moats had been cleared away, and the former fishponds were being used for pleasure boating. Between 1757 and the early 1770s modifications were made to the house, the main one being the addition of a north wing. According to the authors of the Buildings of England series, the architect responsible for this was James Wyatt. Also between 1757 and 1770, the Brooke family built a walled garden at a distance from the house to provide fruit, vegetables and flowers. The family also developed the woodland around the house, creating pathways, a stream-glade and a rock garden. Brick-built wine bins were added to the undercroft, developing it into a wine cellar, and barrel vaulting was added to the former entrance hall to the abbey (which was known as the outer parlour), obscuring its arcade.

During the mid-18th century, Sir Richard Brooke was involved in a campaign to prevent the Bridgewater Canal from being built through his estate. The Bridgewater Canal Extension Act had been passed in 1762, and it made allowances for limited disturbance to the Norton estate. However Sir Richard did not see the necessity for the canal and opposed its passing through his estate. In 1773 the canal was opened from Manchester to Runcorn, except for 1 mile (2 km) across the estate, which meant that goods had to be unloaded and carted around it. Eventually Sir Richard capitulated, and the canal was completed throughout its length by March 1776.

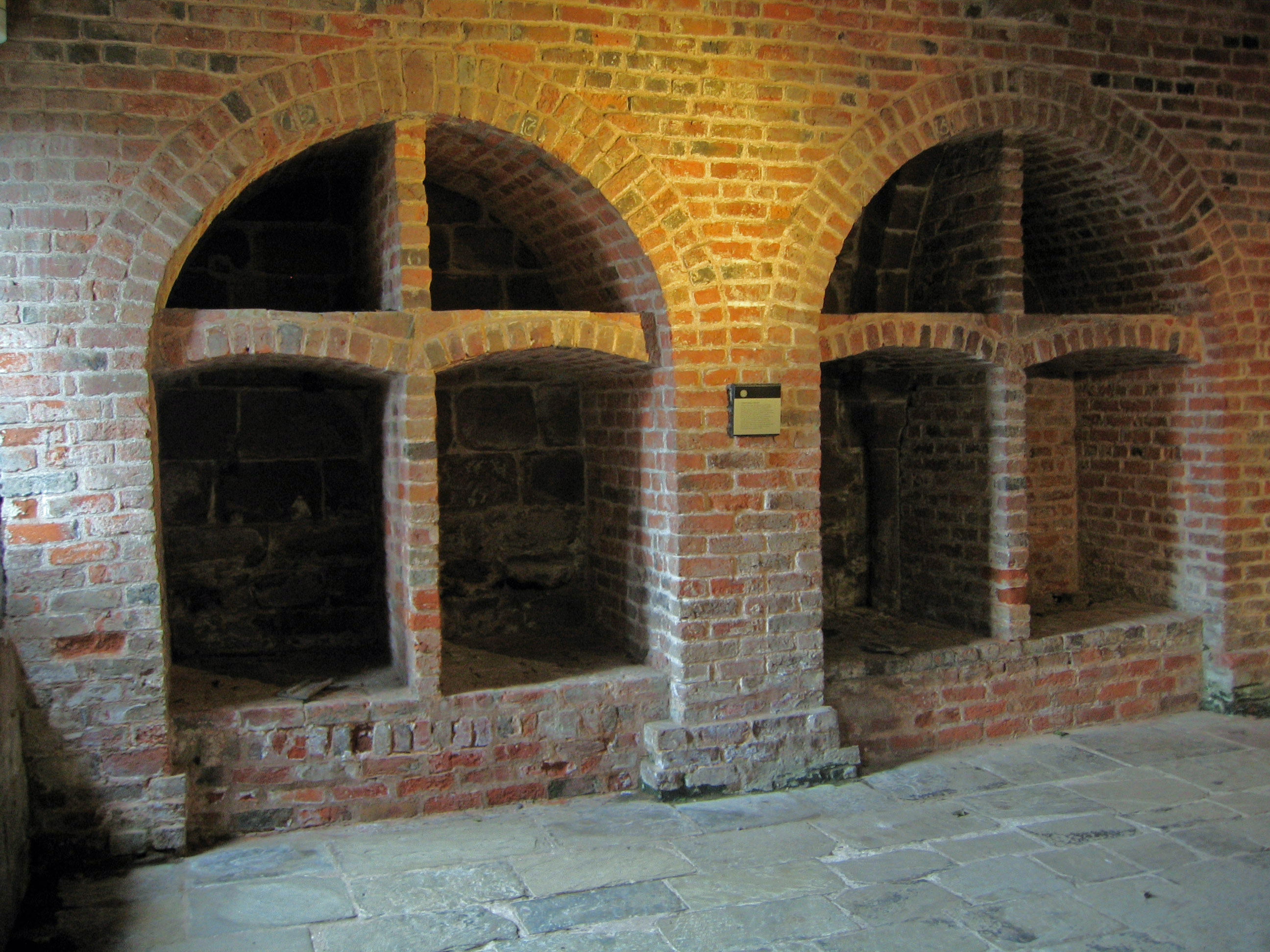
Wine bins in the undercroft

By 1853 a service range had been added to the south wing of the house. In 1868 the external flight of stairs was removed from the west front and a new porch entrance was added to its ground floor. The entrance featured a Norman doorway that had been moved from elsewhere in the monastery; Greene believes that it probably formed the entrance from the west cloister walk into the nave of the church. An exact replica of this doorway was built and placed to the north of the Norman doorway, making a double entrance. The whole of the undercroft was radically restored, giving it a Gothic theme, adding stained glass windows and a medieval-style fireplace. The ground to the south of the house was levelled and formal gardens were established.

During the 19th century the estate was again affected by transport projects. In 1804 the Runcorn to Latchford Canal was opened, replacing the Mersey and Irwell Navigation; this cut off the northern part of the estate, making it only accessible by a bridge. The Grand Junction Railway was built across the estate in 1837, followed by the Warrington and Chester Railway, which opened in 1850; both of these lines affected the southeast part of the estate. In 1894, the Runcorn to Latchford Canal was replaced by the Manchester Ship Canal, and the northern part of the estate could only be accessed by a swing bridge. The Brooke family left the house in 1921, and it was almost completely demolished in 1928. Rubble from the house was used in the foundations of a new chemical works. During the demolition, the undercroft was retained and roofed with a cap of concrete. In 1966 the current Sir Richard Brooke gave Norton Priory in trust for the benefit of the public.

=== Excavations and museum ===
In 1971 J. Patrick Greene was given a contract to carry out a six-month excavation for Runcorn Development Corporation as part of a plan to develop a park in the centre of Runcorn New Town. The site consisted of a 500-acre (202 ha) area of fields and woods to the north of the Bridgewater Canal. Greene's initial findings led to his being employed for a further 12 years to supervise a major excavation of the site. The buildings found included the Norman doorway with its Victorian addition and three medieval rooms. Specialists were employed and local volunteers were recruited to assist with the excavation, while teams of supervised prisoners were used to perform some of the heavier work. The area excavated exceeded that at any European monastic site that used modern methods. The Development Corporation decided to create a museum on the site, and in 1975 Norton Priory Museum Trust was established.

In 1989 Greene published his book about the excavations entitled Norton Priory: The Archaeology of a Medieval Religious House. Further work has been carried out, recording and analysing the archaeological findings. In 2008 Fraser Brown and Christine Howard-Davis published Norton Priory: Monastery to Museum, in which the findings are described in more detail. Howard-Davis was largely responsible for the post-excavation assessment and for compiling a database for the artefacts and, with Brown, for their analysis.

== Findings from excavations ==
=== Priory 1134–1236 ===
The excavations have revealed information about the original priory buildings and grounds, and how they were subsequently modified. A series of ditches was found that would have provided a supply of fresh water and also a means for drainage of a relatively wet site. Evidence of the earliest temporary timber buildings in which the canons were originally housed was found in the form of 12th-century post pits. Norton Priory is one of few monastic sites to have produced evidence of temporary quarters. The remains of at least seven temporary buildings have been discovered. It is considered that the largest of these, because it had more substantial foundations than the others, was probably the timber-framed church; another was most likely the gatehouse, and the other buildings provided accommodation for the canons and the senior secular craftsmen.

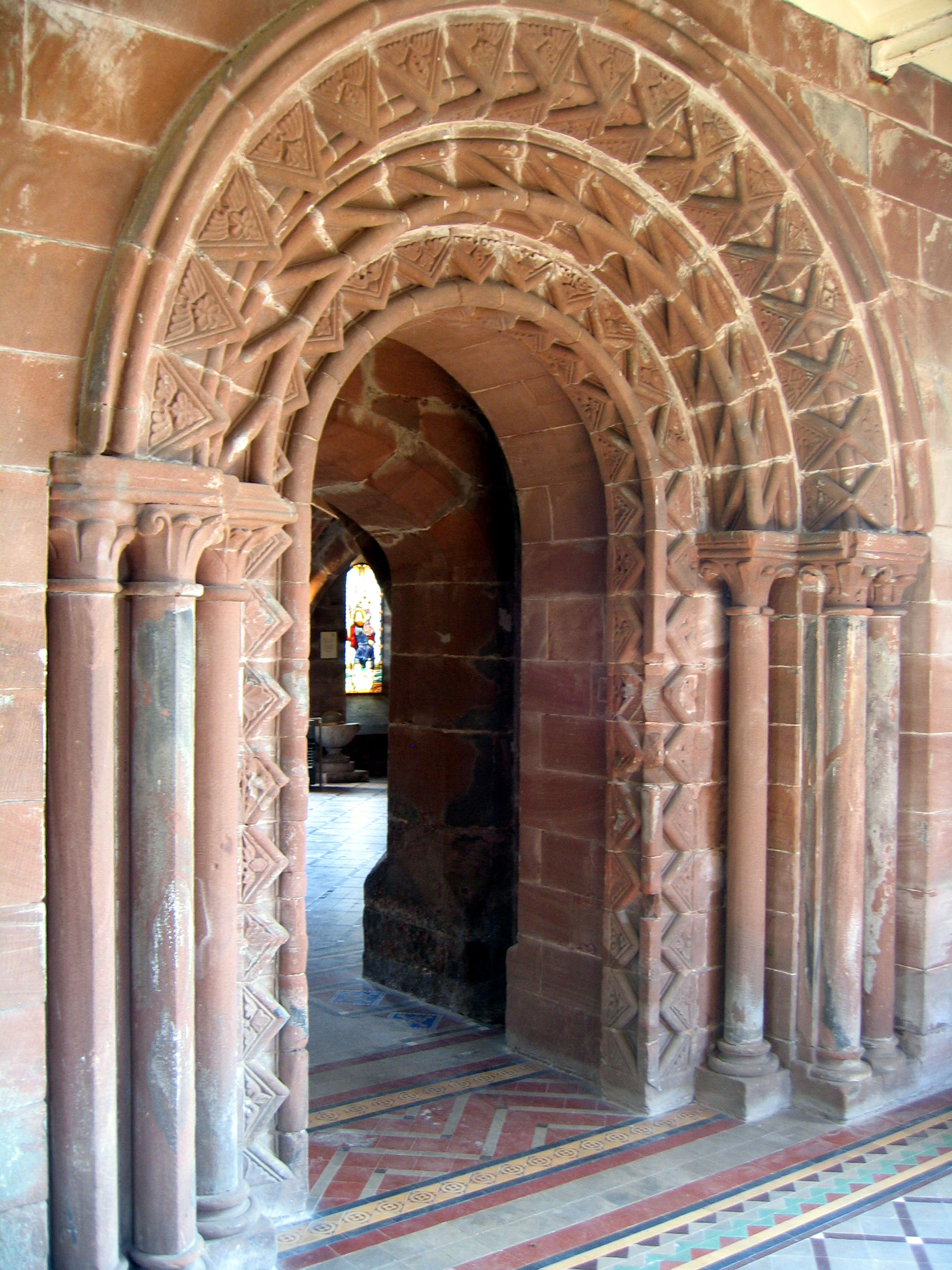
Norman doorway in the undercroft

The earliest masonry building was the church, which was constructed on shallow foundations of sandstone rubble and pebbles on boulder clay. The walls were built in local red sandstone with ashlar faces and a rubble and mortar core. The ground plan of the original church was cruciform, and consisted of a nave without aisles, a choir at the crossing with a tower above it, a square-ended chancel, and north and south transepts, each with an eastern chapel. The total length of the church was 148 feet (45.1 m) and the total length across the transepts was 74 feet (22.6 m), giving a ratio of 2:1. The walls of the church were 5 feet (1.5 m) wide at the base, and the crossing tower was supported on four piers.

The other early buildings were built surrounding a cloister to the south of the church. The east range incorporated the chapter house and also contained the sacristy, the canons' dormitory and the reredorter. The upper storey of the west range provided living accommodation for the prior and an area where secular visitors could be received. In the lower storey was the undercroft where food and fuel were stored. The south range contained the refectory, and at a distance from the south range stood the kitchen. Evidence of a bell foundry dating from this period was found 55 yards (50 m) to the north of the church. It is likely that this was used for casting a tenor bell. A few moulded stones from this early period were found. These included nine blocks that probably formed part of a corbel table. There were also two beak-head voussoirs; this type of voussoir is rare in Cheshire, and has been found in only one other church in the county.

Considerable expansion occurred during the last two decades of the 12th century and the first two or three decades of the 13th century. The south and west ranges were demolished and rebuilt, enlarging the cloister from about 36 feet (11 m) by 32 feet (10 m) to about 56 feet (17 m) by 52 feet (16 m). This meant that a door in the south wall of the church had to be blocked off and a new highly decorated doorway was built at the northeast corner of the cloister; this doorway has survived. The lower storey of the west range, the other standing remains of the priory, also dates from this period; it comprises the cellarer's undercroft and a passage to its north, known as the outer parlour. The outer parlour had been the entrance to the priory from the outside world, and was "sumptuously decorated" so that "the power and wealth of the priory could be displayed in tangible fashion to those coming from the secular world". The undercroft, used for storage, was divided into two chambers, and its decoration was much plainer. The upper floor has been lost; it is considered that this contained the prior's living quarters and, possibly, a chapel over the outer parlour. A new and larger reredorter was built at the end of the east range, and it is believed that work might have started on a new chapter house. A system of stone drains was constructed to replace the previous open ditches. The west wall of the church was demolished and replaced by a more massive structure, 10 feet (3 m) thick at the base. The east wall was also demolished and the chancel was extended, forming an additional area measuring approximately 27 feet (8 m) by 23 feet (7 m).

=== Priory and abbey 1236–1536 ===
The excavation revealed evidence of the fire of 1236, including ash, charcoal, burnt planks and a burnt wooden bowl. It is thought that the fire probably started in the timber-built kitchens at the junction of the west and south ranges, and then spread to the monastic buildings and church. Most of the wood in the buildings, including the furnishings and roofs, would have been destroyed, although the masonry walls remained largely intact. The major repairs required gave an opportunity for the extension of the church by the addition of new chapels to both of the transepts, and its refurbishment in a manner even grander than previously. The cloister had been badly damaged in the fire and its arcade was rebuilt on the previous foundations. The new arcade was of "very high quality and finely wrought construction". Brown and Howard-Davis state that the kitchens were rebuilt on the same site and it appears that they were rebuilt in timber yet again. Excavations have found evidence of a second bell foundry in the northwest of the priory grounds. The date of this is uncertain but Greene suggests that it was built to cast a new bell to replace the original one that was damaged in the fire. Later in the 13th century another chapel was added to the north transept. Accommodation for guests was constructed to the southwest of the monastic buildings.

In the later part of the 13th century and during the following century the chapel in the south transept was replaced by a grander two-chambered chapel. This balanced the enlarged chapels in the north transept, restoring the church's cruciform plan. Around this time the east end of the church was further extended when a reliquary chapel was added measuring about 42 feet (13 m) by 24 feet (7 m). A guest hall was built to the west of the earlier guest quarters. After the status of the foundation was elevated from a priory to an abbey, a tower house was added to the west range. This is shown on the engraving by the Buck brothers, but it has left little in the way of archaeological remains. The church was extended by the addition of a north aisle. There is little evidence of later major alterations before the dissolution. There is evidence to suggest that the cloister was rebuilt, and that alterations were made to the east range.

=== Burials ===
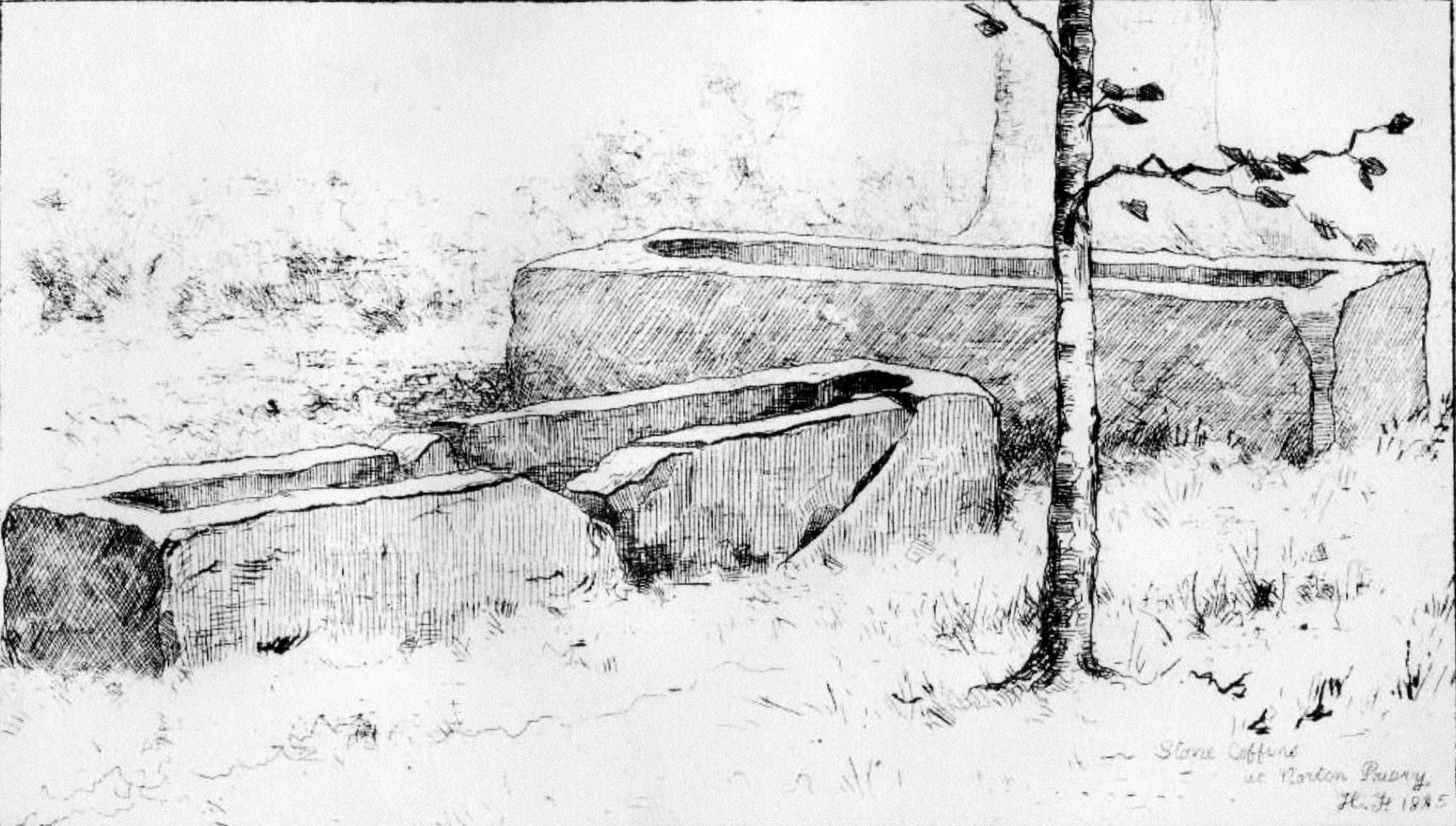
Coffins found at Norton Priory

The excavations revealed information about the burials carried out within the church and the monastic buildings, and in the surrounding grounds. They are considered to be "either those of Augustinian canons, privileged members of their lay household, or of important members of the Dutton family". Most burials were in stone coffins or in wooden coffins with stone lids, and had been carried out from the late 12th century up to the time of the dissolution. The site of the burial depended on the status of the individual, whether they were clerical or lay, and their degree of importance. Priors, abbots, and high-ranking canons were buried within the church, with those towards the east end of the church being the most important. Other canons were buried in a graveyard outside the church, in an area to the south and east of the chancel. Members of the laity were buried either in the church, towards the west end of the nave or in the north aisle, or outside the church around its west end. It is possible that there was a lay cemetery to the north and west of the church. The addition of the chapels to the north transept, and their expansion, was carried out for the Dutton family, making it their burial chapel, or family mausoleum, and the highest concentration of burials was found in this part of the church. It is considered that the north aisle, built after the priory became an abbey, was added to provide a burial place for members of the laity.

The excavations revealed 49 stone coffins, 30 coffin lids, and five headstones. Twelve of the lids were carved in high relief, with designs including flowers or foliage. One lid depicts an oak tree issuing from a human head in the style of a Green Man, another has a cross, a dragon and a female effigy, while others have shield and sword motifs. Two contain inscriptions in Norman-French, identifying the deceased. The remaining lids have simpler incised patterns, mainly decorated crosses. The headstones contain crosses. Most of the coffins were sunk into the ground, with the lid at the level of the floor, although a few were found within the walls. Only three stone coffins for children were discovered. These lay in a group, together with a coffin containing a male skeleton, in the vestibule leading to the enlarged chapter house. The most prestigious type of coffin was tapered towards the feet, with the head end carved externally to a hemi-hexagonal shape. Another sign of higher status was the provision of an internal "pillow" for the head.

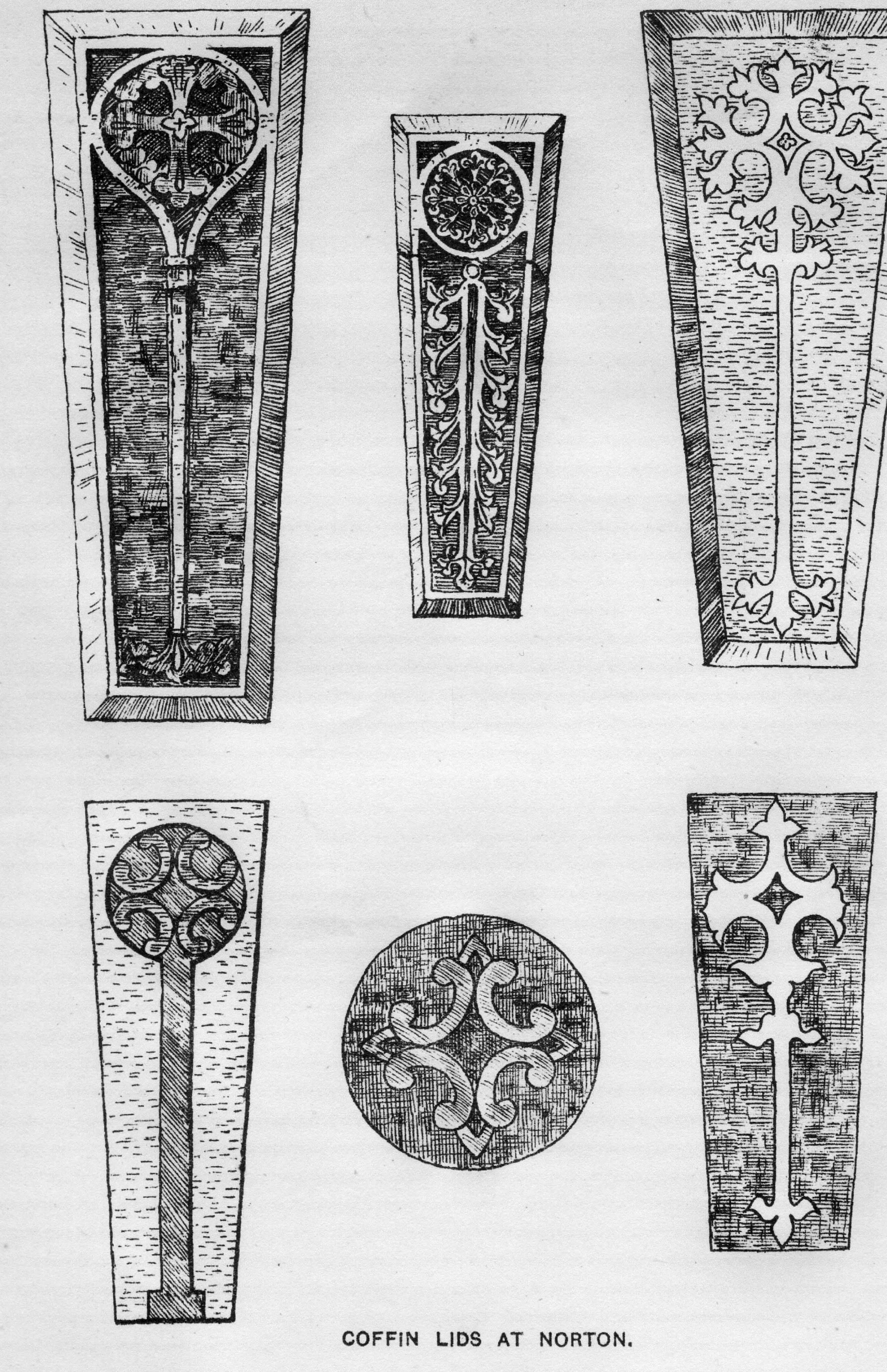
Carved coffin lids

A total of 144 graves was excavated; they contained 130 articulated skeletons in a suitable condition for examination. Of these, 36 were well-preserved, 48 were in a fair condition and 46 were poorly preserved. Males out-numbered females by a ratio of three to one, an expected ratio in a monastic site. Most of the males had survived into middle age (36–45 years) to old age (46 years or older), while equal numbers of females died before and after the age of about 45 years. One female death was presumably due to a complication of pregnancy as she had been carrying a 34-week foetus. The average height of the adult males was 5 feet 8 inches (1.73 m) and that of the adult females was 5 feet 2 inches (1.57 m).

The bones show a variety of diseases and degenerative processes. Six skeletons showed evidence of Paget's disease of bone (osteitis deformans). The most severe case of Paget's disease was in a body buried in the nave in a stone coffin. The lid was carved with two shields, indicating that the occupant had been a knight. One skeleton showed signs of leprosy affecting bones in the face, hands and feet. No definite cases of tuberculosis directly affecting bones were found but in two individuals there were changes in the ribs consistent with their having suffered from tuberculosis of the lungs. The only major congenital abnormality found consisted of bony changes resulting from a possible case of Down's syndrome. Relatively minor congenital abnormalities of the spine were found in 19 skeletons, ten of which were cases of spina bifida occulta. Other spinal abnormalities included fused vertebrae, spondylolysis and transitional vertebrae. Definite evidence of fractured bones was found in ten skeletons, and evidence of possible fractures was found in three other cases. One cranium contained a large circular lesion which may have been the consequence of trepanning. Other diseases specific to bones and joints were osteoarthritis, diffuse idiopathic skeletal hyperostosis (DISH), and possible cases of spondyloarthropathy. Three skeletons showed possible evidence of rickets, two had changes of osteoporosis, and three crania had features of hyperostosis frontalis interna, a metabolic condition affecting post-menopausal women. Osteomata (benign tumours of bone) were found in three cases.

Examination of the jaws and teeth gave information about the dental health of those buried in the priory. The degree of wear of teeth was greater than it is at present, while the incidence of dental caries was much lower than it is now, as was the incidence of periodontal disease. A consequence of the wear of the teeth was "compensatory eruption" of the teeth in order to keep contact with the opposing teeth. It was concluded that the people buried in the priory had few problems with their teeth or jaws. Loss of teeth was due to wear of the teeth, rather than from caries or periodontal disease.

=== Country house ===
Little archaeological evidence relates to the period immediately after the dissolution, or to the Tudor house built on part of the site. A sawpit was found in the outer courtyard. It is considered that this might date from the early period of the Brookes' house, or it may have been constructed during the later years of the abbey. The kitchens to the south of the Tudor house and their drainage systems appear to have been used by the Brookes, and according to Brown and Howard-Davis, were possibly rebuilt by the family. The areas previously occupied by the cloisters and the guest quarters were probably used as middens. Few archaeological findings remain from the Georgian house, apart from a fragment of a wall from the south front, and the foundations of the north wing. The much-altered medieval undercroft still stands, with its Norman doorway and Victorian replica, barrel vaulting, wine bins, and blind arcading in the former outer parlour.

=== Artefacts from the buildings ===
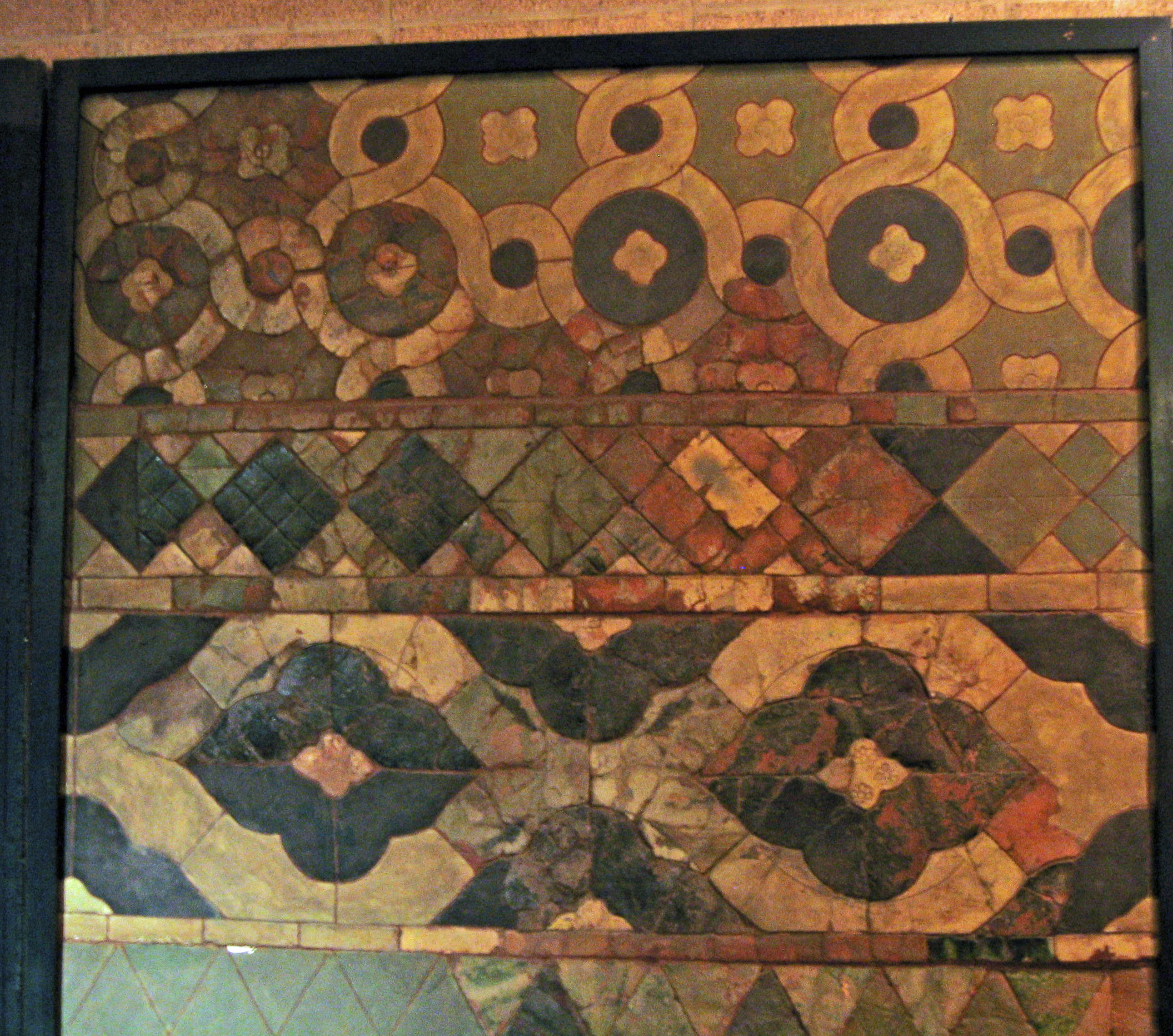
Montage of mosaic tiles in the museum

A large number of tiles and tile fragments that had lined the floor of the church and some of the monastic buildings were found in the excavations. The oldest tiles date from the early 14th century. The total area of tiles discovered was about 80 square metres (860 ft^{2}), and is "the largest area of a floor of this type to be found in any modern excavation". The site has "the largest, and most varied, excavated collection of medieval tiles in the North West" and "the greatest variety of individual mosaic shapes found anywhere in Britain". The tiles found made a pavement forming the floor of the choir of the church and the transepts. The chancel floor was probably also tiled; these tiles have not survived because the chancel was at a higher level than the rest of the church, and the tiles would have been removed during subsequent gardening. A dump of tiles to the south of the site of the chapter house suggests that this was also tiled. In the 15th century a second tile floor was laid on top of the original floor in the choir where it had become worn. The tiles on the original floor were of various shapes, forming a mosaic. The tiles were all glazed and coloured, the main colours being black, green and yellow. Many of them had been decorated by impressing a wooden stamp into the moist clay before it was fired; these are known as line-impressed tiles. The line-impressed designs included masks of lions or other animals, rosettes, and trefoils. Other tiles or tile fragments showed portions of trees, foliage, birds and inscriptions. In the chapels of the north transept, the burial place of the Dutton family, were tiles depicting mail, thought to be part of a military effigy, and tiles bearing fragments of heraldic designs. The tiles from the upper (later) pavement were all square, and again were line-inscribed with patterns forming parts of larger designs. A related discovery at the excavation was the kiln in which most of the tiles on the site were fired.

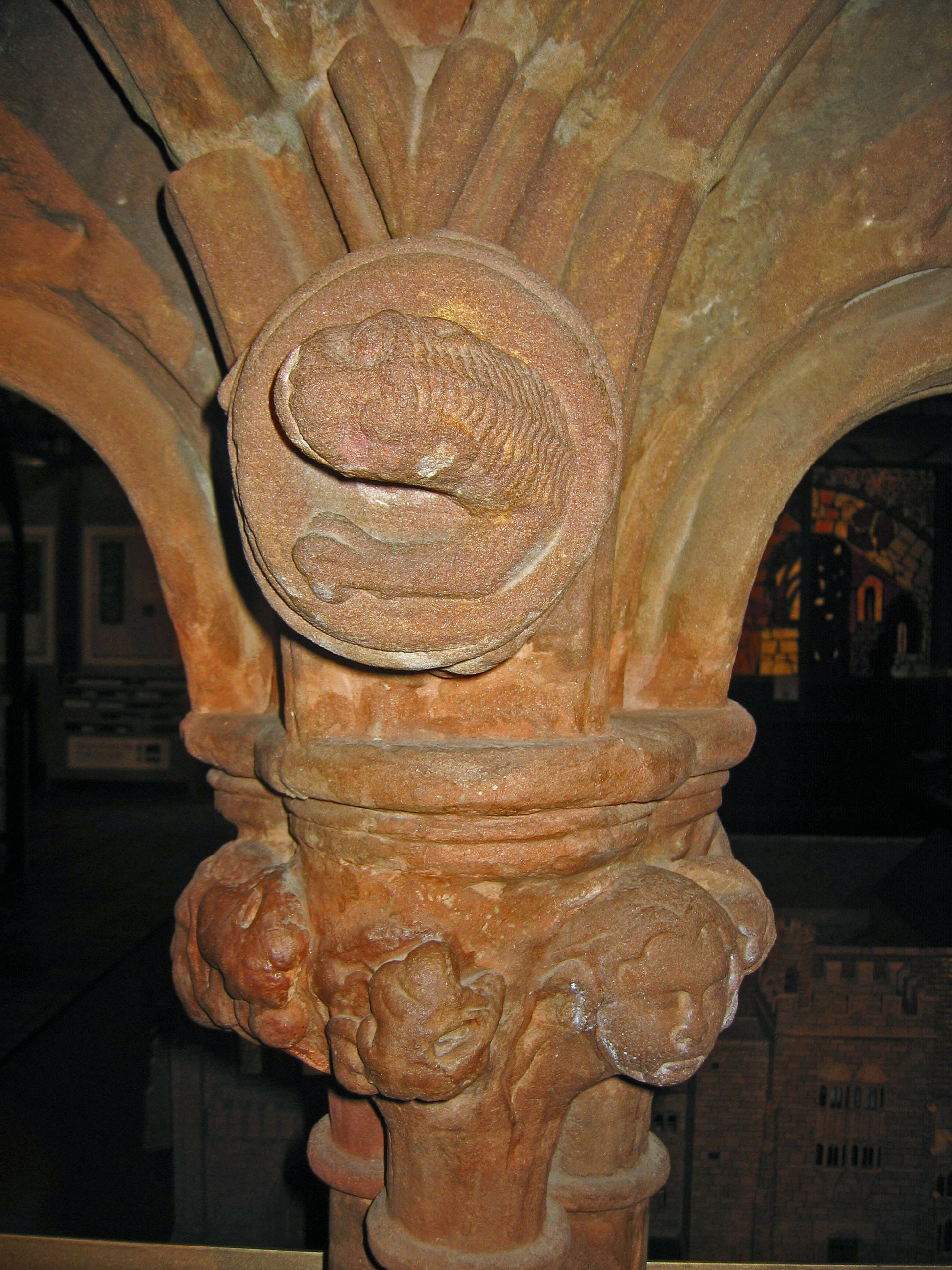
Capital and spandrel from reconstructed arcade in the museum

The excavations also revealed stones or fragments of carved stone dating from the 12th to the 16th centuries. The earliest are in Romanesque style and include two voussoirs decorated with beakheads (grotesque animal heads with long pointed bird-like beaks). Other stones dating from the 12th century are in Gothic style; they include a capital decorated with leaves and a portion of the tracery from a rose window. Many of the stones from the 13th century were originally part of the cloister arcade, and had been re-used to form the core of a later cloister arcade. They include stones sculpted with depictions of humans and animals. The best preserved of these are the heads of two canons, each wearing a cowl with the tonsure visible, the head of a woman with shoulder-length hair, parts of a seated figure holding an open book, and a creature that might represent a serpent or an otter. There are numerous fragments dating from the 14th and 15th centuries. These include portions of string courses, tracery, corbels, window jambs, and arch heads. At least three of the corbels were carved in the form of human heads. Over 1,500 fragments of painted medieval glass were found, most of it in a poor condition. These show that the glazing scheme used in the priory was mainly in grisaille (monochrome) style. Almost 1,300 fragments of glass from later periods, and nearly 1,150 sherds of ceramic roof tiles were also found.

=== Artefacts from daily life ===
Some 500 fragments of pottery were found dating from the medieval period. Most of these were parts of jars, jugs or pipkins and were found in the area of the kitchen range. Most of it was produced locally, although 13 sherds of Stamford Ware, fragments of two jugs from North France, and two small pieces of Saintonge pottery have been identified. Only a few wooden bowls were recovered. Much more pottery was found dating from the post-medieval period and later. Again most of this had been manufactured in England, especially in Staffordshire. Fragments of pottery from abroad included pieces from a Westerwald mug, a jug from Cologne and items of Chinese porcelain. The excavations produced over 4,000 sherds of glass, dating from the 12th to the 20th centuries, but only 16 of these came from the period before the dissolution. A total of 1,170 fragments from clay tobacco pipes were found, dating from about 1580 to the early 20th century.

Six medieval coins were recovered, the earliest of which was a silver penny of John from the early 13th century. Coins from later periods were a silver threepence from the reign of Elizabeth I and a silver penny from Charles I. Only low-denomination coins were found from the 18th century and later, including a 10-pfennig piece from Germany dated 1901. Two silver spoons were recovered, one of which was dated 1846 from the hallmark. Objects made from copper alloy were found, many of which were associated with personal adornment and dress including brooches, buckles, and buttons. Also found from this period was a small simple chape (scabbard tip), and part of a skimmer that had been used in the kitchen. Artefacts made from iron, other than nails, were again mainly items of personal adornment and dress. Other identifiable iron items from this period included keys, two possible rowel spurs (spurs with revolving pointed wheels), and about 12 horseshoes.

Nearly 2,000 fragments of lead were found, 940 of which were droplets of melted metal, some of these being a consequence of the fire in 1236. One of the earliest artefacts was a papal bulla dating from the rule of Pope Clement III (1187–91). Two other possible seals were discovered. A total of 15 lead discs were recovered, some of which were inscribed with crosses. Two of these were found in graves, but the purpose of the discs has not been reliably explained. The other lead artefacts from this period were associated with the structure of the buildings and include fragments of kame (the lead used in leaded windows), ventilator grills, and water pipes. Leather fragments almost all came from shoes, and included an almost complete child's shoe dating from the late 16th or the 17th century. Another find was a small gemstone, a cabochon (polished) sardonyx.

== Present day ==
Norton Priory is considered to be "a monastic site of international importance" and is "the most extensively excavated monastic site in Britain, if not Western Europe". It is open to the public and run by a charitable trust, the Norton Priory Museum Trust. The Trust was founded in 1975 and the first museum was opened in 1982; a much enlarged museum was built and opened in 2016. The Trust owns and maintains many of the artefacts found during the excavations, and has created an electronic database to record all the acquisitions. In addition, it holds records relating to the excavations, including site notebooks and photographs. The area open to the public consists of a museum, the standing archaeological remains, 42 acres of garden and woodland, and the walled garden of the former house.

=== Museum ===
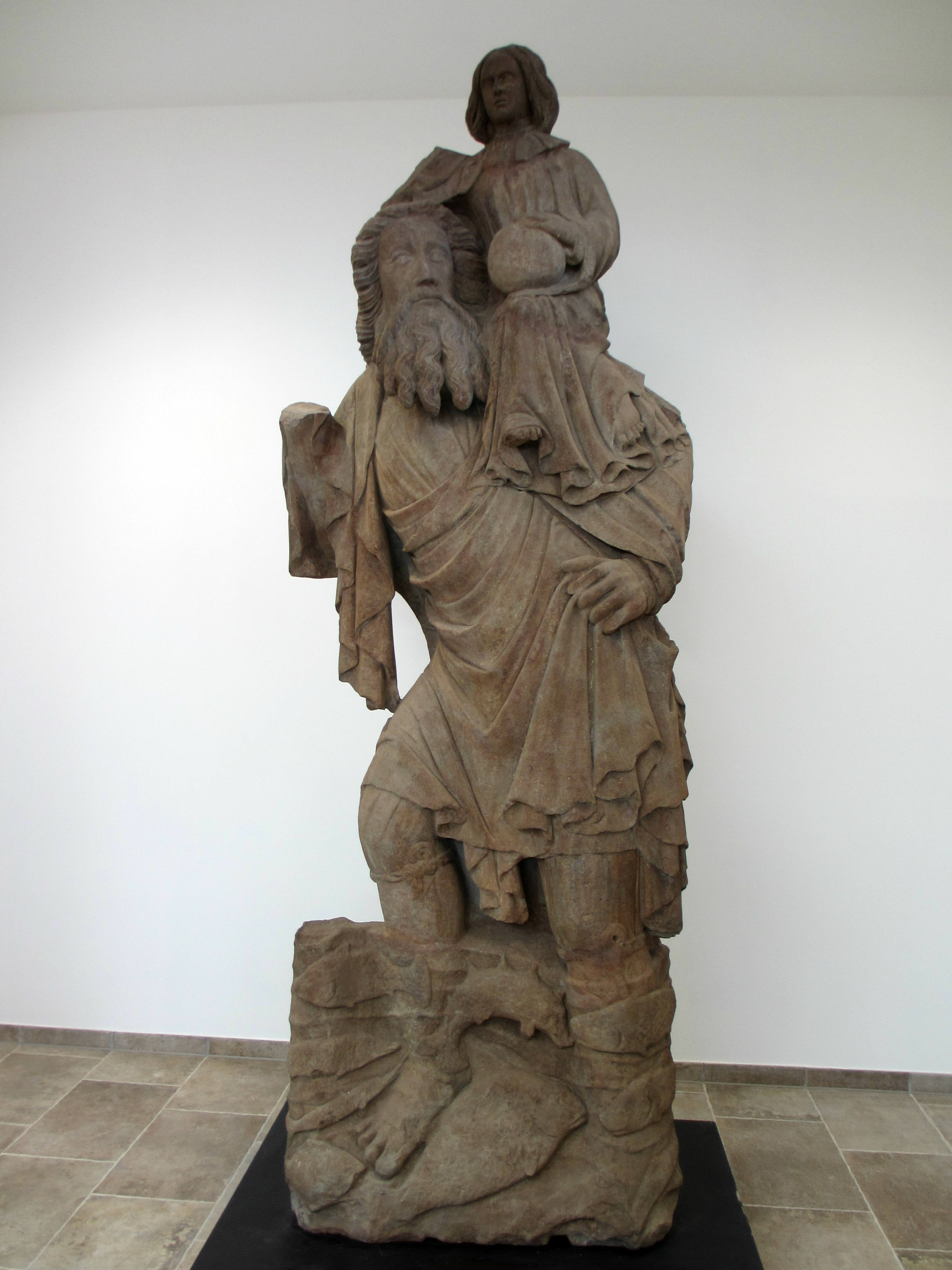
Medieval statue of St Christopher at Norton Priory

The museum contains information relating to the history of the site and some of the artefacts discovered during the excavations. These include carved coffin lids, medieval mosaic tiles, pottery, scribe's writing equipment and domestic items from the various buildings on the site such as buttons, combs and wig curlers. Two medieval skeletons recovered in the excavations are on display, including one showing signs of Paget's disease of bone. Standing in the museum is a reconstruction of the cloister arcade as it had been built following the fire of 1236. It consists of moulded pointed arches with springer blocks, voussoirs and apex stones, supported on triple shafts with foliate capitals and moulded bases. Above the capitals, at the bases of the arches, are sculptures that include depictions of human and animal heads. The human heads consist of two canons with hoods and protruding tonsures, other males, and females with shoulder-length hair. In one spandrel is a seated figure with an outstretched arm holding a book. Other carvings depict such subjects as fabulous beasts, and an otter or a snake.

The museum contains the medieval sandstone statue of Saint Christopher, which is considered to be "a work of national and even international importance". Saint Christopher was associated with the abbey because of its proximity to the River Mersey and the dangers associated with crossing the river. The statue shows the saint wading through fish-filled water carrying the Christ-child on his shoulder. It has been dated to about 1390, it is 3.37 metres (11.1 ft) tall, and was once painted in bright colours. The gallery also contains a three-dimensional representation of the statue as it is believed it would have originally appeared.

=== Archaeological remains ===
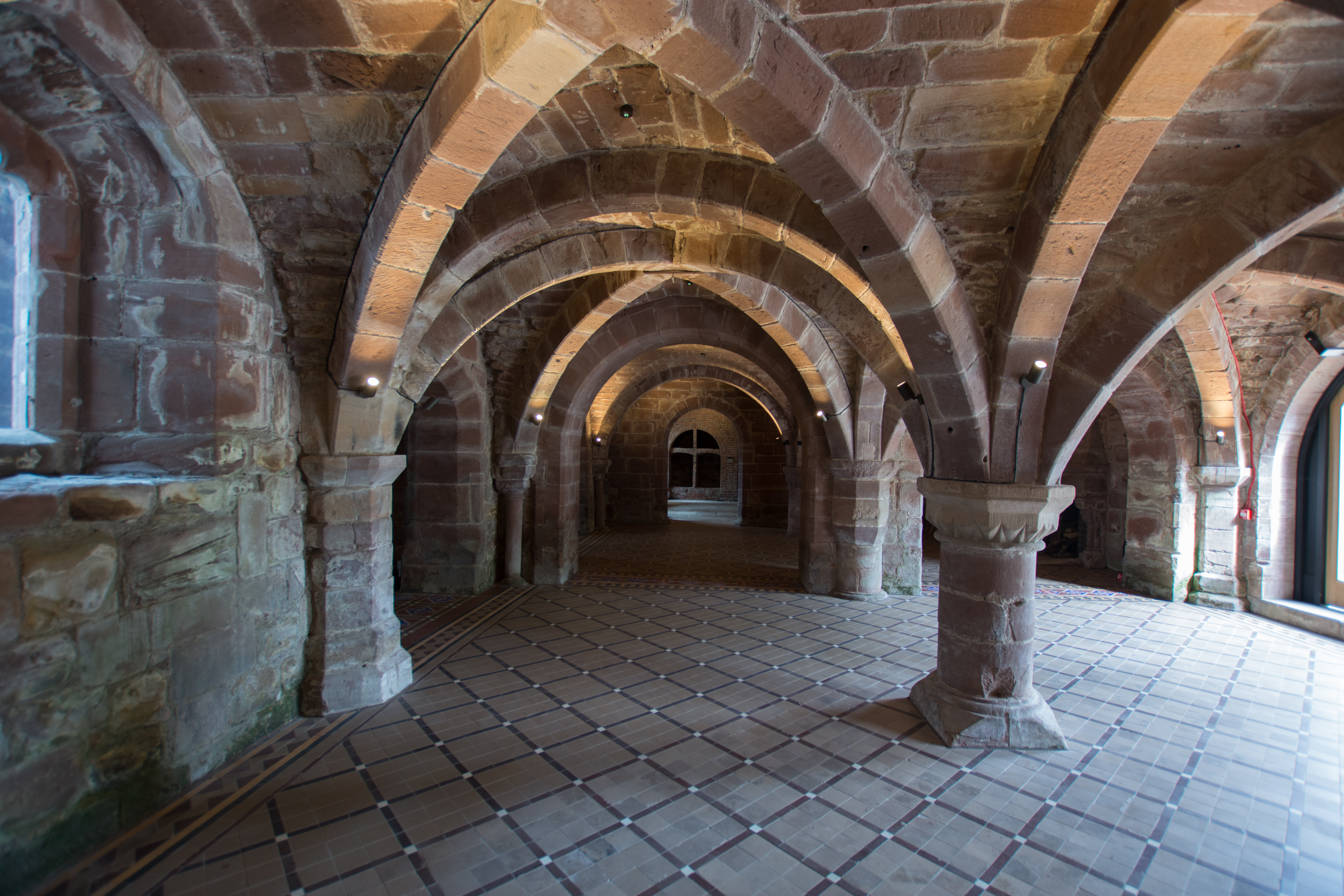
Rib vaulted roof of the undercroft

The archaeological remains are recognised as a Grade I listed building and a scheduled ancient monument, and are considered to be the most important monastic remains in Cheshire. They consist of the former undercroft and the foundations of the church and monastic buildings that were exposed during the excavations. The undercroft stands outside the museum building. It is a single-storey structure consisting of seven pairs of bays divided into two compartments, one of four and the other of three bays. It is entered through the portico added to the west front of the country house in 1886 by way of a pair of arched doorways in Norman style. The doorway to the right (south) is original, dating from the late 12th century, while the other doorway is a replica dated 1886. The older doorway has been described as "the finest decorated Norman doorway in Cheshire". It is in good condition with little evidence of erosion and Greene considers that this is because it has always been protected from the weather. The portico leads into the four-bay compartment. This has a tiled floor and contains a medieval-style fireplace. The roof is ribbed vaulted. On the east wall is a two-arched doorway leading to the former cloisters. To the north another archway leads to the three-bay compartment. This also has a tile floor and contains the brick wine bins added in the 1780s. The roof of this compartment has groined vaults. The undercroft also contains a bell mould, reconstructed from the fragments of the original mould found in the excavations.

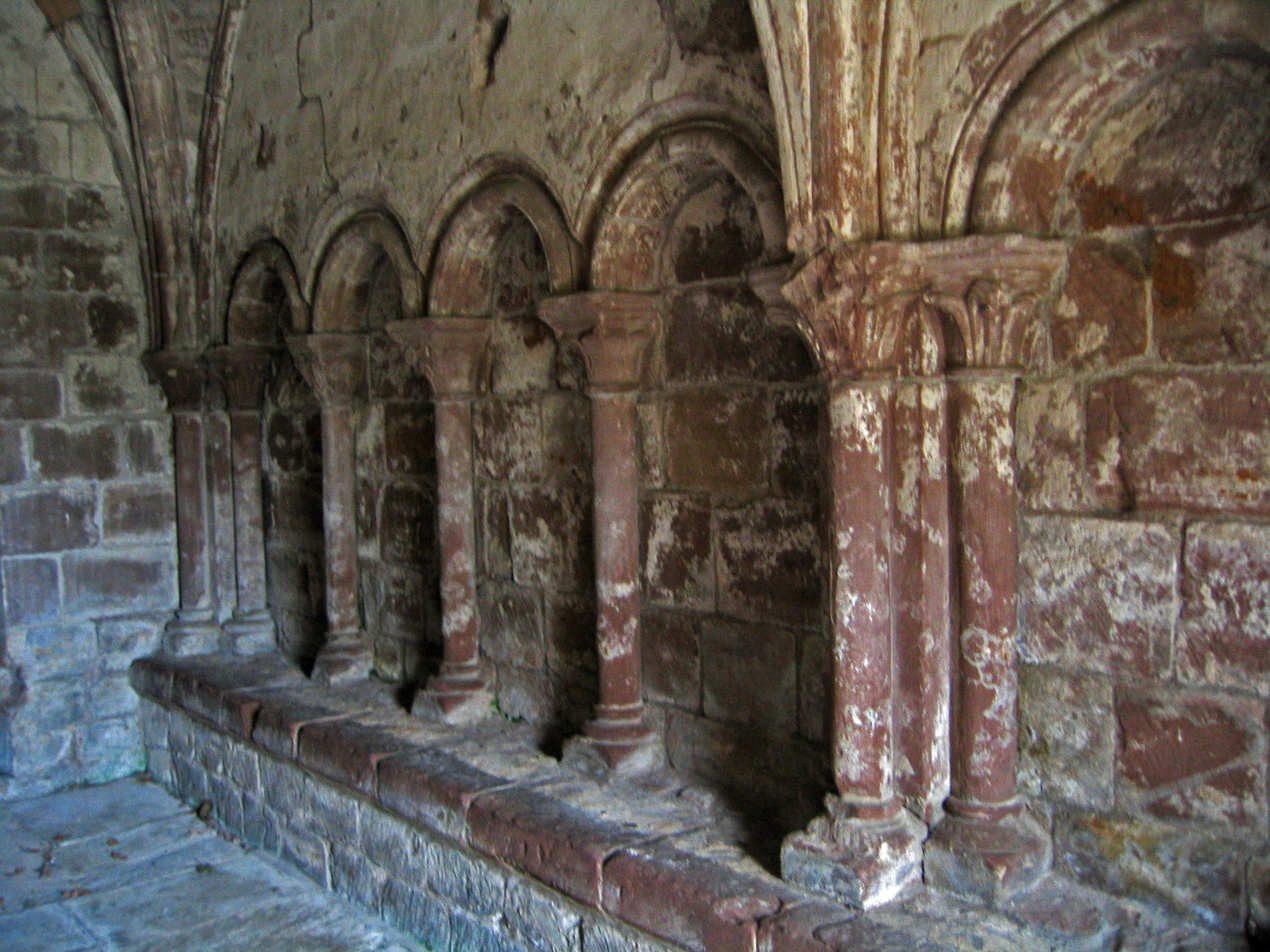
North arcade in the former outer parlour

At the northern end of the undercroft is the passage known as the outer parlour. This has stone benches on each side and elaborately carved blind arcades above them. The arcades each consist of two groups of four round-headed arches with capitals, free-standing columns and bases that are set on the benches. The capitals and mouldings of the arches are decorated with a variety of carvings, the capitals being predominantly late Romanesque in style and the arches early Gothic. The carvings include depictions of human heads, stiff-leaf foliage and animals.

=== Grounds ===
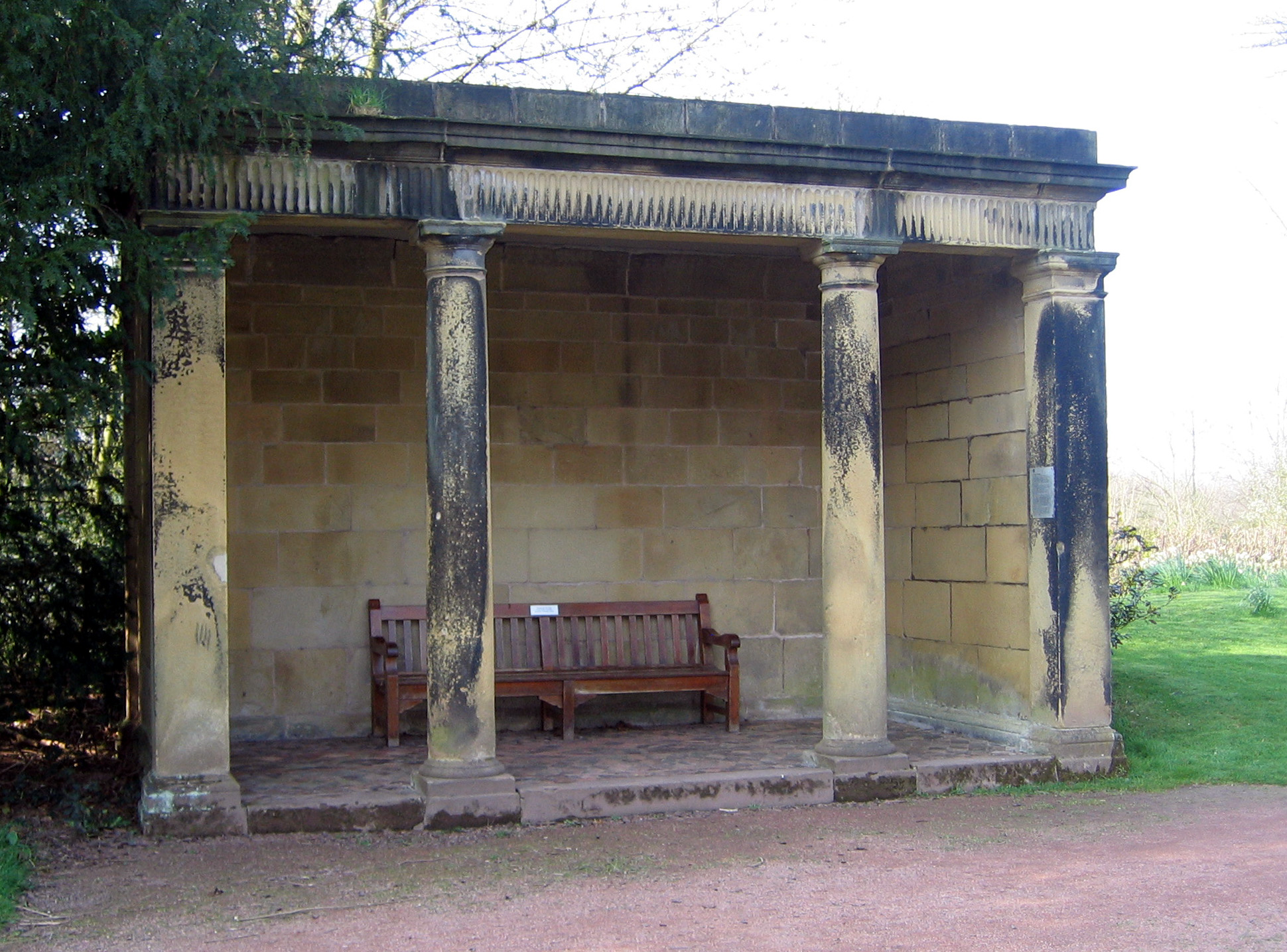
Garden loggia in the grounds

The 38 acres (15 ha) of grounds surrounding the house have been largely restored to include the 18th-century pathways, the stream-glade and the 19th-century rock garden. The foundations exposed in the excavations show the plan of the former church and monastic buildings. In the grounds is a Grade II listed garden loggia in yellow sandstone, possibly designed by James Wyatt. At its front are two Doric columns and two antae, and above these is a cornice with a fluted frieze. The side walls are built in stone, and the back wall is constructed internally of stone and externally of brickwork. Also in the grounds are several modern sculptures, and a sculpture trail has been designed in conjunction with these. In the 1970s the fragments of the mould found in the bell pit were re-assembled and used to create a replica of the bell, which was cast in Widnes and now stands in a frame in the grounds. This was opened at a ceremony performed by Sir Bernard Lovell in 1977. A herb garden was developed as part of the BBC's Hidden Garden programme. This seeks to re-create a herb garden as it would have been during the medieval period, and its plan is based on herb gardens in other monastic sites. The plants grown are those reputed to be of value in treating the diseases revealed in the excavated skeletons.

=== Walled gardens ===
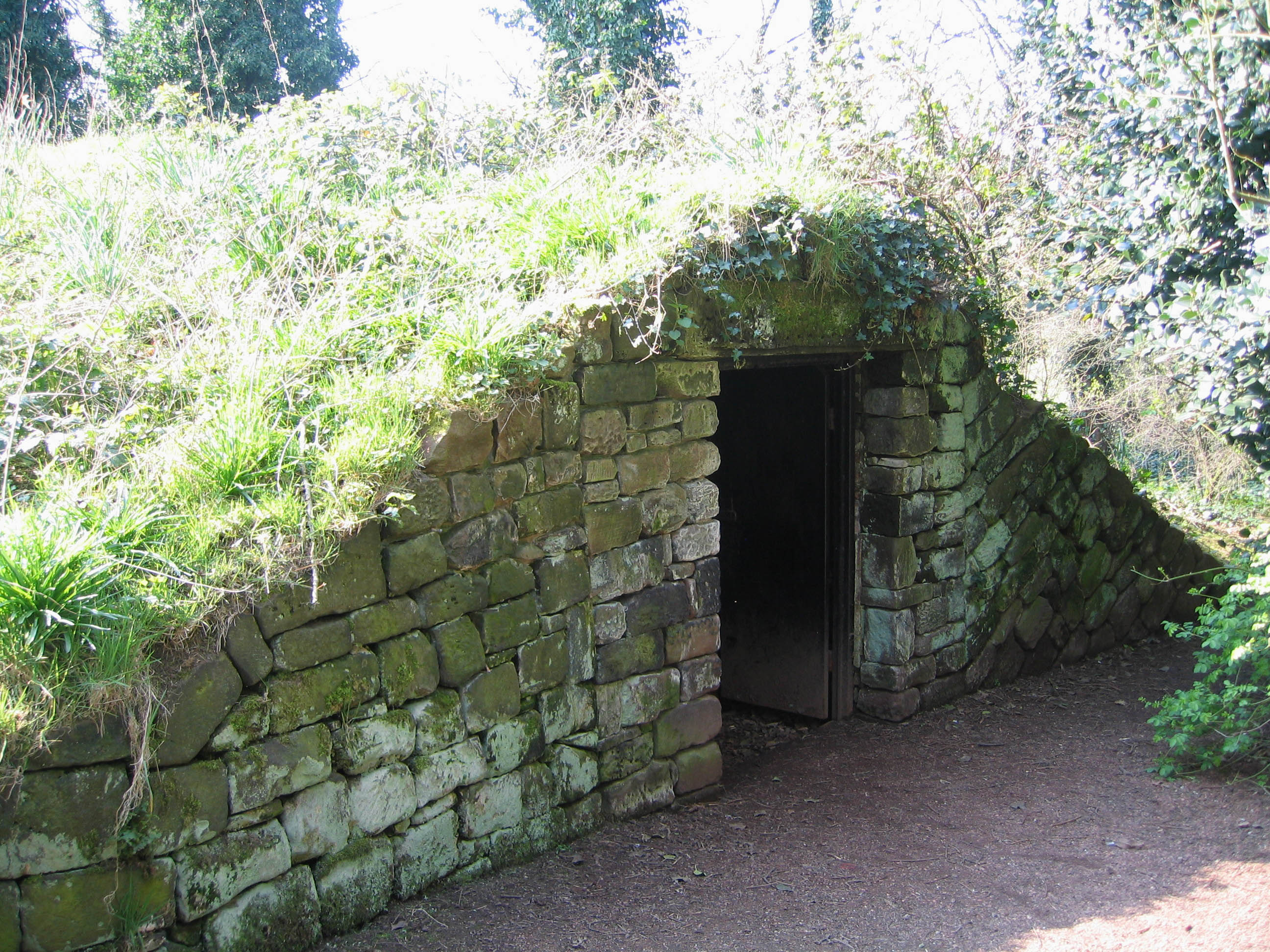
Ice House

The 3.5 acre (1 ha) walled garden was restored in the 1980s. It includes an orchard, fruit and vegetable gardens, ornamental borders and a rose walk, as well as the national collection of tree quince (Cydonia oblonga), with 20 different varieties. Close to the walled garden is a Grade II listed ice house, probably dating from the 18th century, which is constructed in brick covered with a mound of earth. The entrance is surrounded by stone walls, from which a tunnel leads to a circular domed chamber.

=== Current activities ===
The museum is a visitor attraction. It arranges a series of events for the general public throughout the year, including guided tours, family fun days and concerts. Its educational programme is aimed at all ages; it includes workshops for the general public, and courses focusing on formal and informal aspects of children's education. An outreach programme is intended for individuals and groups in the community. Since its opening, the museum has won awards for its work in tourism, education, outreach and gardening. In 2004 the museum's Positive Partnerships project, in which people with learning disabilities worked alongside museum staff, was a finalist in the Gulbenkian Prize for museums and galleries. In August 2016 the newly rebuilt and expanded museum opened to the public. This cost £4.5m, of which £3.9m was contributed by the Heritage Lottery Fund.

== See also ==
- List of monastic houses in Cheshire
- Listed buildings in Runcorn (urban area)
- Grade I and II* listed buildings in Halton (borough)
- List of Scheduled Monuments in Cheshire (1066–1539)
- Norman architecture in Cheshire
- Brooke baronets of Norton Priory
