= Piers Dutton =

British politician (died 1545)

Sir Piers Dutton (died 17 August 1545) was the lord of the manor of Dutton from 1527 until his death. He was involved in the closing of Norton Abbey during the Dissolution of the Monasteries in 1536. He started rebuilding Dutton Hall in 1539.

== Early life ==
Piers Dutton was the son of Piers Dutton and Eleanor Foulshurst. Sir Piers Dutton inherited his family lands in Hatton on the death of his grandfather (also named Piers Dutton) in 1503. His family were a junior line of the Dutton family from Dutton, who had been living there since the Norman conquest.

== Public life ==
Piers Dutton was the mayor of Chester for three years (1512–1515). In 1526, Lawrence Dutton, the head of the senior branch of the family living in Dutton, died. He left no male heirs, but was survived by several sisters. Subsequently, there was a dispute between the sisters Alice, Eleanor, Anne, Margaret and Isabel on one side and Piers Dutton, who was judged the next male heir, on the other. The Dutton land was settled to Piers Dutton, with some of the other lands settled to the sisters of Lawrence. The following year Piers Dutton was knighted by Henry VIII. When the commissioners arrived to close Norton Abbey as part of the Dissolution of the Monasteries in October 1536 they faced opposition from around 300 people. They locked themselves in the tower and sent a letter to Sir Piers Dutton, who arrived and arrested the abbot and several others. Dutton then sent a report of the incident to Henry VIII. He started rebuilding Dutton Hall in 1539. Sir Piers Dutton became High Sheriff of Cheshire on 22 November 1542 and died on 17 August 1545.

== Marriages and issue ==
Sir Piers Dutton married Eleanor Leigh, who was the daughter of Thomas Leigh of Adlington and Katherine Savage. After the death of Eleanor, Dutton married Julian Poytz. Sir Piers and Eleanor Dutton had the following children:

- Piers Dutton – died young.
- Hugh Dutton – the eldest surviving son who married Jane Booth and had issue. He inherited the majority of his father's estate including the manor of Dutton, but died shortly after Sir Piers Dutton in 1546. The male line died out with the death of Hugh's grandson Thomas Dutton in 1614 and the assets were inherited by Thomas's daughter Eleanor, wife of Gilbert Gerrard. At the end of the Gilbert line, the heiress, Elizabeth Gerrard, married James Hamilton, 4th Duke of Hamilton, who was also created Baron Dutton.
- Ralph Dutton – the second eldest surviving son, who Sir Piers Dutton gave the manor in Hatton. Had issue and his descendants lived at Hatton until the late 17th century.
- Elizabeth Dutton, who married William Manley.
- Alice Dutton
- Katherine Dutton, who married Roger Puleston.
- Anne Dutton, who married Hamlet Massey.
- Margaret Dutton
- Mary Dutton
- Margery Dutton, who married John Booth.
