= Kevin Greene (archaeologist) =

British archaeologist

Kevin T. Greene FSA
- Born: 1948 (age 77–78)

Academic work
- Discipline: Archaeology
- Sub-discipline: Classical archaeology Archaeological theory
- Institutions: Newcastle University
- Main interests: Roman economy

Kevin Greene FSA (born 1948) is a British classical archaeologist. He was a reader at Newcastle University until his retirement, and is now a visiting fellow in the School of History, Classics and Archaeology. He was elected a Fellow of the Society of Antiquaries of London in January 1981.

His brother, J. Patrick Greene, is also an archaeologist.

== Selected publications ==
- Greene K. 1979. "The pre-flavian Fine Wares. Reports on the excavations at Usk 1965-1976", Cardiff, University of Wales Press, XVI+165 p.
- Greene K. 1999. "The excavations of San Giovanni di Ruoti, vol 1, The villas and their environment". American Journal of Archaeology 103(3), 577-579.
- Greene K. 2002. "Technological innovation and economic progress in the ancient world: M. I. Finley re-considered". Economic History Review 53(1), 29-59.
- Greene K. 2002. Archaeology: An Introduction. London: Routledge, 2002.
- Greene K. 2005. "The economy of Roman Britain: representation and historiography". In: Bruhn, J., Croxford, B., Grigoropoulos D, ed. TRAC 2004: Proceedings of the 12th Annual Theoretical Roman Archaeology Conference, Durham. Oxford, UK: Oxbow. pp. 1–15. doi:10.16995/TRAC2004_1_15
- Greene K. 2007. Archaeology: An Introduction (4th Edition: The Online Companion (updated version)). Newcastle upon Tyne: University of Newcastle upon Tyne, 2007.
