= J. Patrick Greene =

British archaeologist

J. Patrick Greene FSA OBE is a British archaeologist and museum director. He served as Director of the Science and Industry Museum, in Manchester, England from 1983 to 2002, and then CEO of Museums Victoria in Australia from 2002 to 2017.

== Biography ==
Greene was appointed in 1971 to conduct an exploratory excavation at Norton Priory near Runcorn in Cheshire, England. His findings were so important that he was retained for a total of 12 years to organise an excavation which "became the largest in area to be carried out by modern methods on any monastic site in Europe". The excavation formed the basis for a thesis which led to his award of PhD by Leeds University in 1986. In 1983, Greene was appointed as Director of the Museum of Science and Industry in Manchester. He was made an honorary Doctor of Science by Salford University in 1997. In 2002, he was appointed chief executive officer of Museum Victoria, a post that he held until 2017. He has been Museum Director and CEO of EPIC The Irish Emigration Museum since September 2019.

Greene has been President of the Museums Association (UK), Chairman of the European Museum Forum, Chair of the UK Expert Panel of the Heritage Lottery Fund: Museums, Archives and Libraries, and a member of the English Heritage Industrial Archaeology Panel. He is a Fellow of the Society of Antiquaries of London, of the Museums Association and of the Tourism Society, and a member of the Council of Australian Museum Directors and the National Collections Advisory Forum.

== Personal life ==
Greene is the brother of fellow archaeologist Kevin Greene.

== Major publications ==
- Medieval floor tiles: How they were made, Runcorn: Norton Priory Museum, 1979
- Setting up and running a new museum, Association of independent museums, 1980
- Norton Priory: The archaeology of a medieval religious house, Cambridge University Press, 1989, ISBN 0-521-33054-8
- Medieval Monasteries (Archaeology of Medieval Britain), Leicester University Press, 1992, ISBN 978-0-7185-1296-5
