= Samuel and Nathaniel Buck =

British engravers

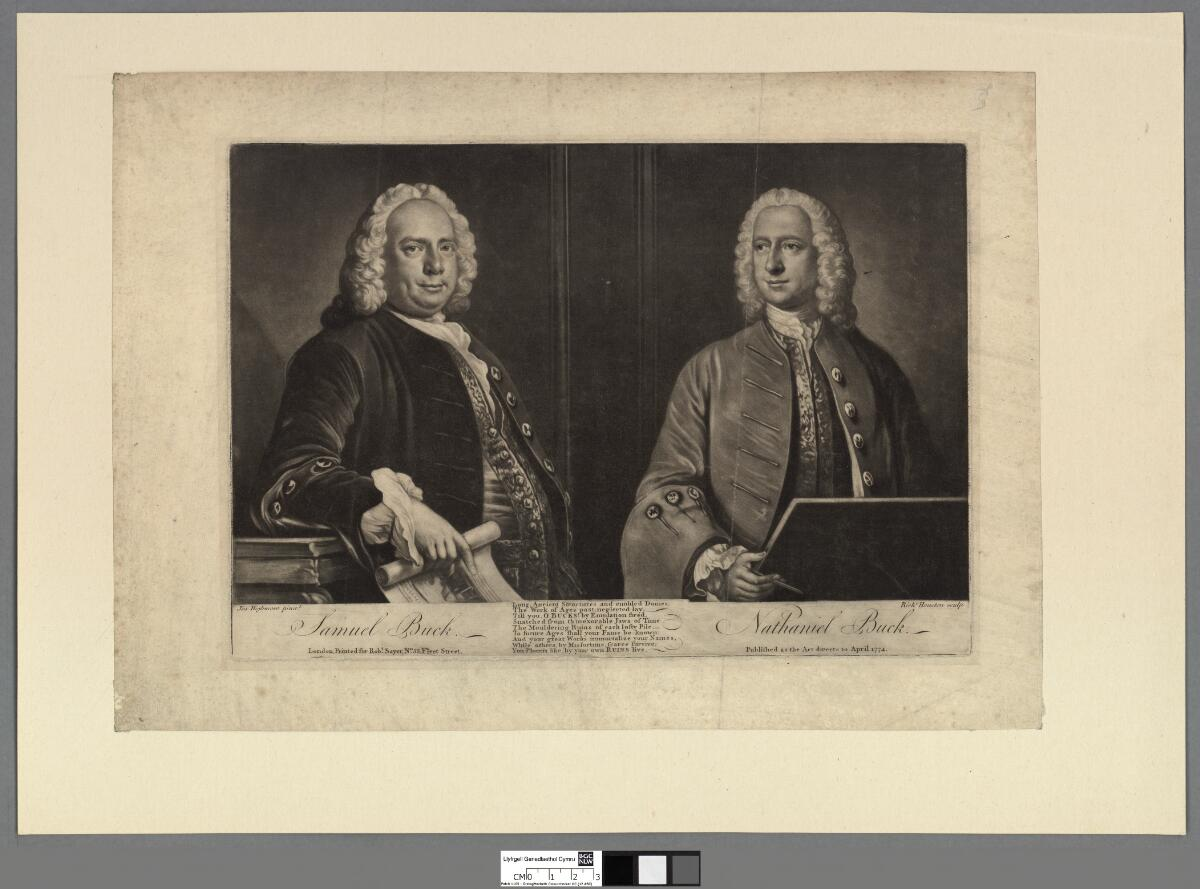
Portrait of Samuel Buck & Nathaniel Buck (4671312)

Samuel Buck (1696 – 17 August 1779) and his brother Nathaniel Buck (died 1759/1774) were English engravers and printmakers, best known for their Buck's Antiquities, depictions of ancient castles and monasteries. Samuel produced much work on his own but when the brothers worked together, they were usually known as the Buck Brothers. More is known about Samuel than Nathaniel.

== Careers ==
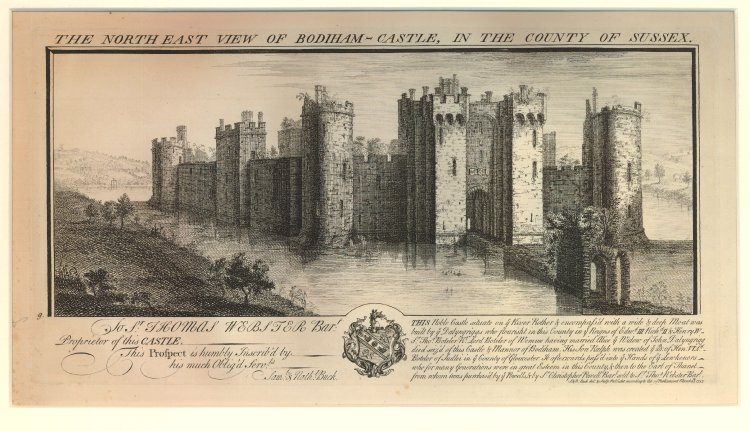
Engraving of 1737 by the Buck Brothers, showing Bodiam Castle in Sussex from the northeast

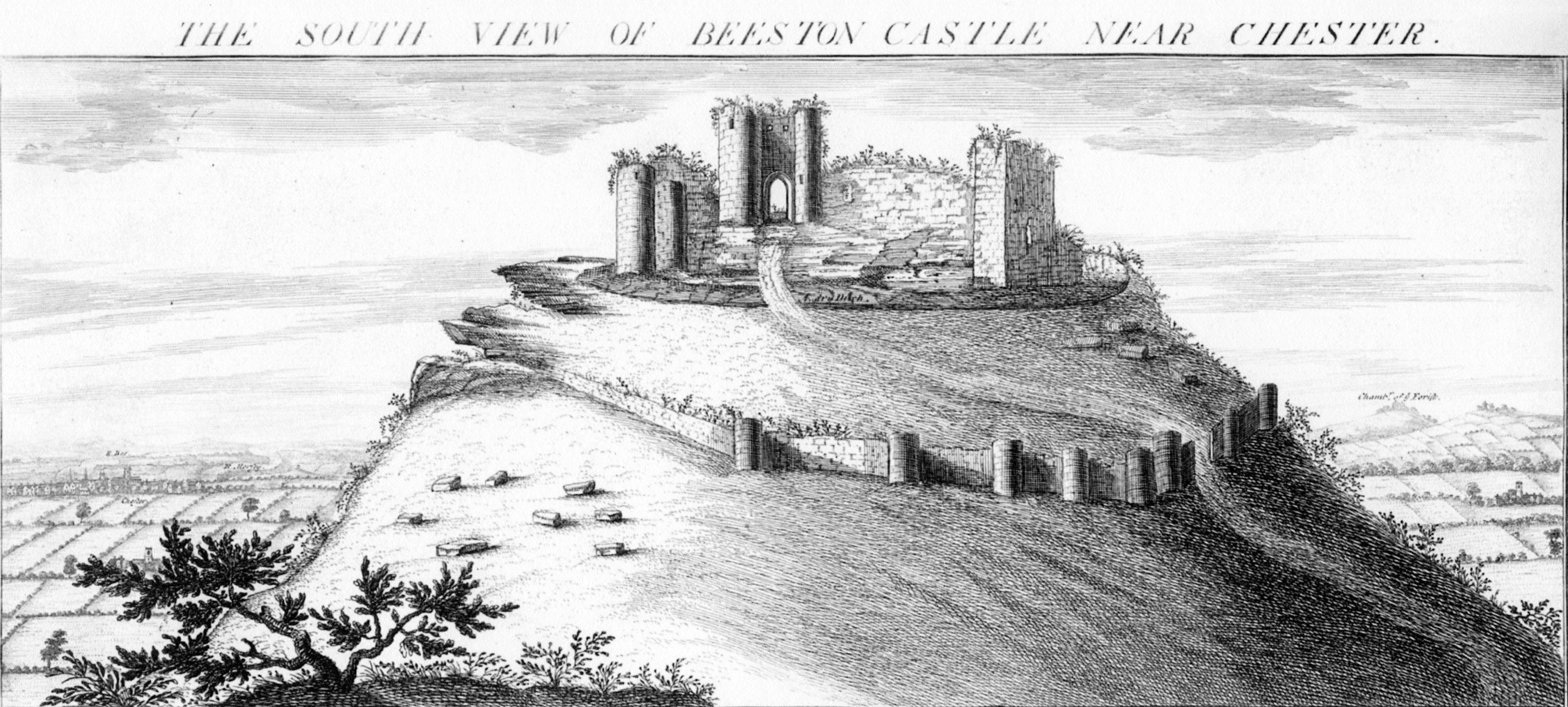
Engraving of 1727 by the Buck Brothers, showing Beeston Castle in Cheshire from the south

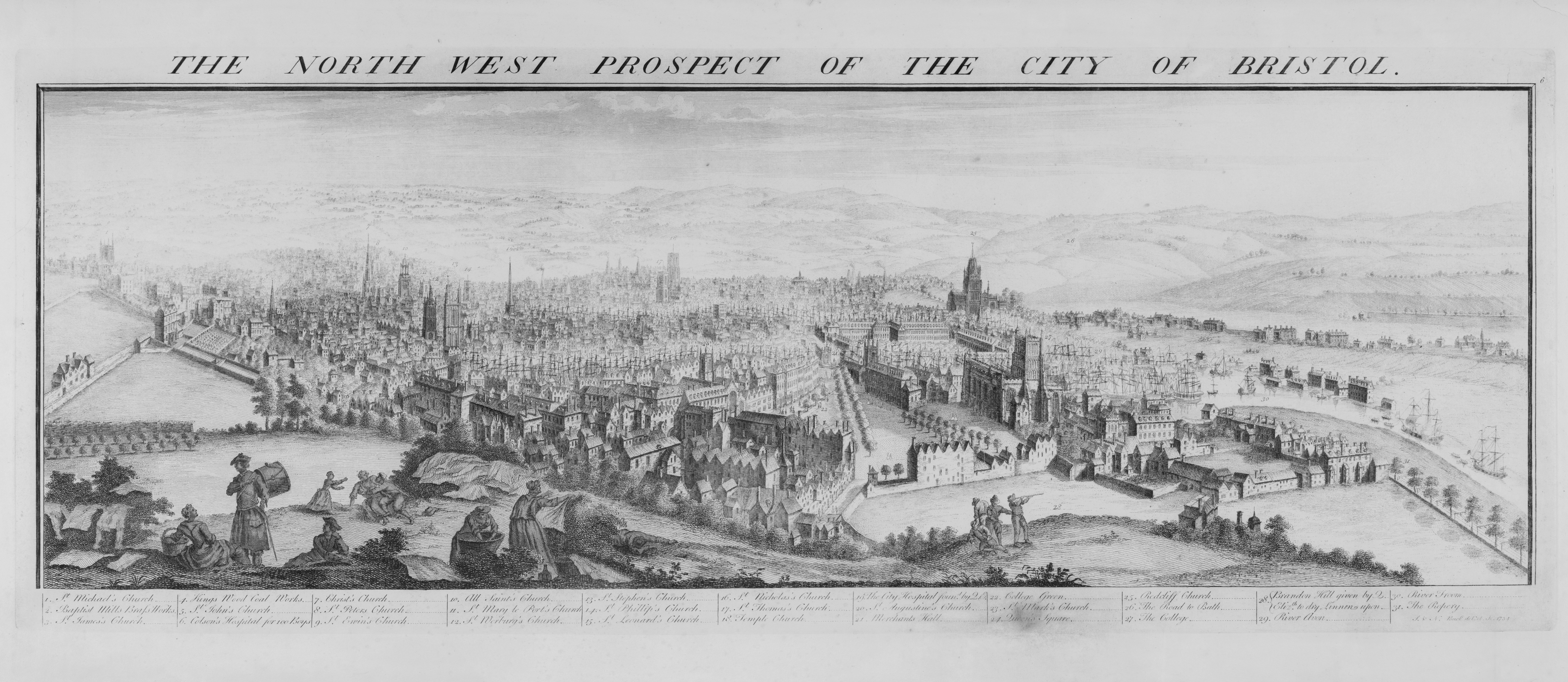
NW Prospect of Bristol, 1734

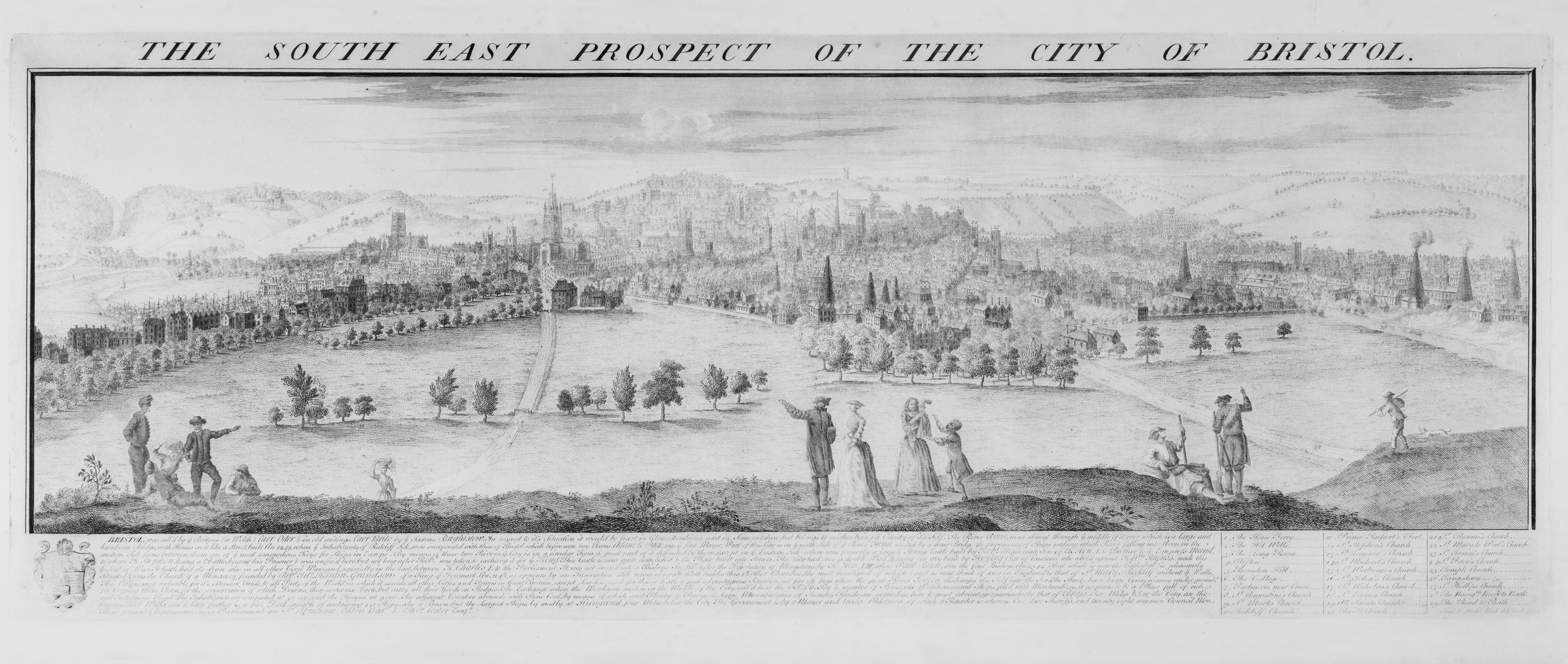
SE Prospect of Bristol, 1734

Samuel Buck was born in Yorkshire in 1696. After publishing some prints in that county he moved to London. With Nathaniel he embarked on making a number of series of prints of "antiquities", which consisted of ancient castles and former religious buildings in England and Wales. Starting in 1724, they travelled around these countries, and completed sets of prints for the regions of England by 1738 and for Wales between 1739 and 1742. These are commonly known as Buck's Antiquities. During this time they also worked on a series of townscapes in England and Wales entitled Cities, Sea-ports and Capital Towns, often providing prospects from multiple directions.

== Deaths and burials ==
Nathaniel was the first to die, sometime between 1759 and 1774. Samuel died on 17 August 1779 in London and was buried in the churchyard of St. Clement Danes. Samuel's later years were spent in poverty.
