= Neil Mathieson =

Scottish chemist and businessman

- Born: 1823; Campbeltown, Argyll and Bute, Scotland
- Died: 14 September 1906 (aged 82–83)
- Occupations: Chemist, businessman
- Spouse(s): Mary Train, Mary Ann Brundrit
- Children: Anne, Thomas Train, Jessie Campbell, Douglas Dugald, William Train
- Parent(s): Dugald McMath Mathieson; Anne McEachran

Neil Mathieson (1823 – 14 September 1906) was a Scottish chemist and businessman.

He was born in Campbeltown, Argyll and Bute, Scotland and came to work for John & Thomas Johnson, soap and alkali makers in Runcorn, Cheshire, where he became works manager. Around 1860 he joined two other Johnson's workers, Duncan McKechnie and Charles Wigg, in setting up the Old Quay Works in Runcorn to make soap and to extract copper by the Henderson wet process. In 1865, when John & Thomas Johnson became registered under the Companies Act as the Runcorn Soap and Alkali Company, Mathieson invested in the company, buying 175 shares. He left the Old Quay Works to set up his own business, Matheison and Company in Widnes, Lancashire in 1870. His partners were Frederick Herbert Gossage, son of William Gossage, and Thomas Sutton Timmis, both of whom had been associated with Gossage's soap business. Matheison and Company became one of the most important companies in Widnes. Its main business was producing alkali by the Leblanc process and they also produced glycerine from soap waste from Gossage's. Later Mathieson's third son, Thomas Train Mathieson, became a partner in the business.

Neil's eldest son, Douglas Dugald (1861–86), an assistant manager at the works, was killed after being struck by a falling derrick. In 1892 Mathieson obtained a charter in Saltville, Virginia to open an alkali plant, buying out the Holston Salt and Plaster Company. His son Thomas Train Mathieson went to USA to supervise this business, the Mathieson Alkali Company, which was later to develop into the Mathieson Chemical Corporation.
