= Duncan McKechnie =

Duncan McKechnie (originally Duncan McGeachy) (1 May 1831 – 7 December 1913) was a British chemical manufacturer and metal extractor. He was trained as a soap boiler in Glasgow and later moved to become a foreman at a soap and alkali factory in Runcorn, Cheshire. In 1869 he entered into partnership with two colleagues to run a new chemical factory in the town, but soon left to found his own company in St Helens. This company specialised in extracting and refining metals. It was sold to the United Alkali Company in 1891. After McKechnie's retirement his descendants continued to run factories bearing the name McKechnie into the 20th century.

== Early life and career ==
Duncan McKechnie was born in 1831 as the illegitimate son of Duncan McGeachy, a farmer in Lailt, Kintyre, Scotland, and Helen Montgomery. Duncan McKechnie (then McGeachy) lived as a baby with his mother and their family, and in 1841 when he was aged 10, he was living with his grandfather in Lailt. During the next decade the family moved to Glasgow, and Duncan became an apprentice soap boiler with Neil Mathieson and Company. In 1858 he married Agnes Miller, and the following year their first child, Daniel, was born, followed by a daughter, Agnes, in 1861. In that year Duncan McGeachy changed his surname to McKechnie, (the anglicised version of McGeachy). Their third child, a daughter, was born in 1863, and in the following year the family moved to Runcorn, Cheshire, England. By this time Neil Mathieson was working in Runcorn as works manager for John & Thomas Johnson, soap and alkali makers. McKechnie was appointed as a foreman at the works, and lived for a short time with the Mathiesons in Heath House, Runcorn. However, in 1865 the Johnson brothers ran into financial difficulties, and their business was floated as a public company, known as the Runcorn Soap and Alkali company. McKechnie continued to work with this company, and during this time he gained experience in working with the extraction of copper from pyrites ash.

== Independent chemical manufacturer ==
In 1865 Charles Wigg established the Old Quay Chemical Works in Runcorn with Neil Mathieson as his partner. Initially they intended to manufacture soap and alkali, but soon changed to copper extraction, and McKechnie joined them as a partner in 1869. However, he did not stay long with this company, leaving in 1871 to form his own copper extraction company in St Helens. His first factory was located by the side of the Sankey Canal. By 1881 he had moved to a site to the southeast of the town, and was employing 70 workers. The business continued to grow, and at the Jubilee Exhibition in Manchester in 1887, they had a stand where they demonstrated their products, which included copper, silver, lead, iron oxide, sulphuric acid, and copper sulphate. The company had been the largest suppliers of copper sulphate to deal with the wine blight caused by the infestation of French vineyards by the fungus Phylloxera. In 1890 the United Alkali Company was formed to protect the interests of the chemical firms using the Leblanc process to manufacture alkali. McKechnie initially hesitated, but then sold his company to them in the following year for an estimated cost of £109,480 (equivalent to £15,100,000 in 2023), and he became a director of the company. In this role he visited the United States with his son, Duncan junior, in 1894, and in 1907 he visited pyrites mines in Spain.

== Personal life ==
McKechnie was a Presbyterian and played an active part in the work of that church in St Helens. He became an elder in 1871, and by 1913 was the senior elder. He served on church committees, was a member of Synod, and was superintendent of the Sunday school. McKechnie also played a part in public life. He was a town councillor, becoming mayor in 1887; he was appointed as a magistrate in 1890, and a county magistrate in 1894. He was also vice-president of the management committee of the Provident Free Hospital in the town.

Duncan and Agnes McKechnie had a total of eleven children, six boys and five girls, born between 1859 and 1878, three of whom died in infancy. Agnes died in 1895 from tuberculosis, and in 1903 Duncan went to live with his daughter, Agnes, in Heath House, Runcorn. He died on 7 December 1913 from bladder cancer, and was buried with other members of his family in St Helens Cemetery.

== Legacy ==
When Duncan McKechnie became a director of the United Alkali Company, his sons Daniel Montgomery and Alexander Miller founded a smelting business known as McKechnie Brothers, and opened a new factory in Widnes refining copper and silver. Daniel died in 1914, and the following year it became a limited company with its headquarters in Birmingham. The company diversified its products, developing and selling the by-products of the smelting process. In 1920 they moved their headquarters back to Widnes. McKechnie Brothers became a public company in 1953, with the family holding a majority of voting rights. Diversification continued with the addition of plastics to their products. The family eventually lost overall control of the company in 1971. New businesses were acquired, and in 1984 the company was renamed McKechnie plc.
