= Charles Wigg =

English chemicals manufacturer

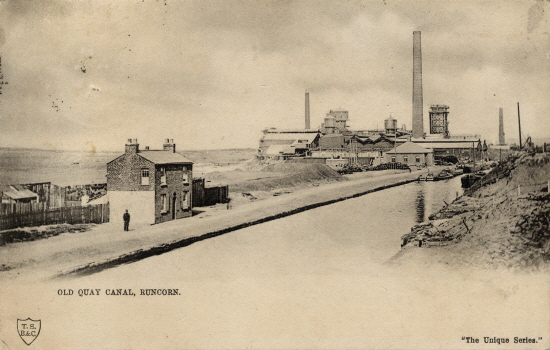
Wigg Works before 1894

Charles Wigg (c. 1824 – 18 July 1899) was an English manufacturer of chemicals in Runcorn, Cheshire, England. After working as an export agent in Liverpool he joined with two managers of a Runcorn chemical factory to build what was initially known as the Old Quay Chemical Works, and later became Wigg Works. At first the works manufactured soap and alkali, but soon moved to extracting copper from pyrites ash, and later making bleaching powder and ferric oxide. During the later part of the 19th century it was one of the most successful businesses in Runcorn. Charles Wigg retired from the business shortly after it was taken over by the United Alkali Company and died eight years later. The site of the factory has been developed into a nature reserve called Wigg Island.

== Early life and career ==
Charles Wigg was born in Liverpool and was the fourth child and the fourth son of John and Martha Maria Wigg. (Note: According to Wigg's biographer, Gerald Hayes, it is reputed that his mother was the illegitimate child of George IV, when prince regent, and Maria Fitzherbert. What is certain is that she was baptised in the church of the Foundling Hospital, an institution to which illegitimate children were sent.) In 1847 his father was described being as an accountant and estate agent with offices in Liverpool and Birkenhead. On 29 April 1847 Charles married Georgiana Bird Burrell in St Michael's Church, Aigburth, when he was described as being a merchant. When John & Thomas Johnson, brothers and soap manufacturers from Runcorn, established an office in Liverpool in 1859, they appointed Wigg as the export agent for their trade with America. His younger brother, George, was a financial agent for the Confederate Government during the American Civil War. Possibly through this connection, the Johnson brothers attempted to run the Union blockade to supply materials to the Confederates. They succeeded in passing one ship through the blockade, as a result of which they made a profit of £70,000 (equivalent to £8,250,000 as of 2023). However, when they attempted to repeat the attempt with more ships, they lost them all in a naval battle at Charleston. They had overcommitted themselves, and this led to their eventual bankruptcy. The business was floated as a public company in 1865, and was known as the Runcorn Soap and Alkali company. Wigg played a part in establishing this company and became the Company Secretary, holding 250 shares.

== Chemical works ==
Also in 1865, Wigg established a new chemical factory in Runcorn making soap and alkali. This was located on the north side of the Runcorn to Latchford Canal between the canal and the River Mersey. The area was known as the Old Quay, and the factory was called the Old Quay Chemical Works. Wigg was joined in the enterprise by Neil Mathieson, who had been the works manager for the Johnsons' business. They soon abandoned making soap and alkali, and began to extract copper from pyrites ash. In 1869 Wigg and Mathieson were joined by Duncan McKechnie. McKechnie had been a foreman at Johnsons', where he had gained expertise in the extraction of copper. However the partnership did not last, and in 1871 McKechnie left to form his own copper works in St Helens. In 1873 Mathieson was named in an action by Sir Richard Brooke of Norton Priory for "damage to his trees and pastures form noxious emissions". Mathieson decided to leave the Old Quay factory and establish his own factory in Widnes on the other side of the Mersey.

In 1871 Matthew Steele, became a partner in the business. He was Wigg's son-in-law, having married his eldest daughter, Adelaide Sherriff, the previous year. Steele had studied medicine at Trinity College Dublin, and had practised as a doctor before his marriage. In 1876 two of Charles' brothers, Frederick William and George Lloyd joined the company as partners, and the company became known as Wigg Brothers and Steele. Frederick William died in 1880, and was replaced as partner by Charles' younger son, Walter John. From 1876 the works had begun to produce bleaching powder, and in the 1880s they were making ferric oxide. By this time the company had become very successful. It was exporting a greater volume of freight through the local docks than any other works in the area. In 1875 70,000 tons of material was received and despatched at the works. The firm owned their own ships in which they transported iron ore, sulphur and chemicals between Widnes and Liverpool. In 1890 Wigg Brothers and Steele became part of the United Alkali Company. Charles Wigg retired from the business the following year.

== Personal life ==
Charles Wigg and his wife had a total of ten children. During this time they were living in Toxteth in Liverpool, and then in Garston on the outskirts of Liverpool. After the collapse of the Johnson Brothers' business, Wigg bought Grice's farm from the Johnsons in the nearby village of Halton, where a new house, Halton Lodge, was built for him. By 1871 he was living in Great Crosby, and in 1881 in North Meols. By 1887 the family had moved to Hoole Bank, Chester. Charles Wigg was a staunch member of the Church of England and a supporter of many charities. Politically he was a Conservative, at one time being the chairman of the Conservative Association in Runcorn. He was invited to stand for election as a Member of Parliament, but declined. Wigg was involved more widely in the chemical industry, including overseeing changes at an alkali factory at Weston Point. He tried to develop a plant for manufacturing alkali by the ammonia-soda process, and took out a patent for it, but it was unsuccessful. He was involved with the organisation of the chemical industry, including working with the Alkali Makers Association, and the Bleaching Powder Association. Charles Wigg died on 18 July 1899 at the age of 75, leaving an estate of £107,894 (equivalent to £15,340,000 as of 2023).

== Legacy ==
In 1894 the Manchester Ship Canal replaced the Runcorn to Latchford Canal alongside the works, creating an island which has been known since as Wigg Island. The factory became known as Wigg Works, and in 1926 merged with the Gaskell-Marsh group of factories in Widnes, but it closed in 1930. The site was re-opened in 1940 by the Ministry of Supply to manufacture sulphuric acid. This was taken over in 1946 by Imperial Chemical Industries (ICI), and renamed Wigg West. (Note: On Wigg Island to the east of this a sulphuric acid plant had been built in 1919 by the Chemical and Metallurgical Corporation. This was taken over by ICI in 1993, and re-named Wigg East in 1946. Also on the eastern part of the island ICI built Randle Works in 1937 to manufacture mustard gas, and later other toxic gases.) Manufacturing ended on Wigg Island in 1960. By the 21st century the land had been cleared, and it was opened up for public access and recreation in 2002. Wigg Island was declared a nature reserve in 2004. A visitor centre has been built, and this is managed by the Cheshire Wildlife Trust.
