= Wigg Island =

Nature reserve in Runcorn, Cheshire, England

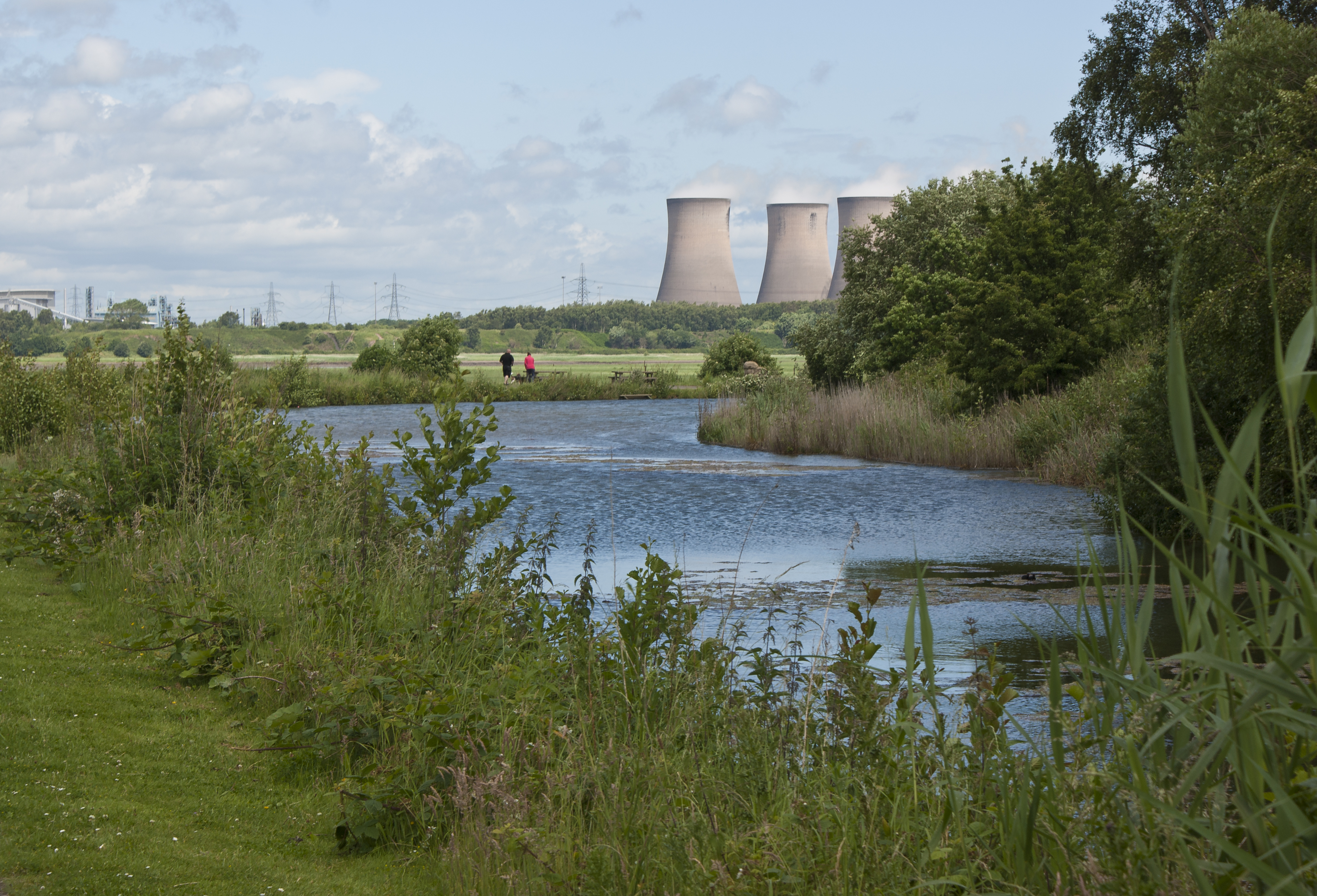
- A remnant of the Runcorn and Latchford Canal on Wigg Island in 2012
- Interactive map of Wigg Island
- Type: Local nature reserve
- Location: Runcorn, England
- Coordinates: 53.3452°N 2.7144°W
- Area: 23 hectares (0.23 km^{2})
- Opened: 19 April 2002
- Etymology: Named for Charles Wigg's earlier chemical works
- Operator: Halton Borough Council
- Awards: Green Flag Award
- Website: visit.halton.me/project/wigg-island/

Wigg Island, also known as Wigg Island Community Park, is a community park and Local Nature Reserve in Runcorn, England.

== Location ==
Wigg Island lies between the River Mersey and the Manchester Ship Canal in Runcorn. It is reached via The Old Quay Bridge, a Grade II listed swing bridge that was built in 1894 and which crosses over the Manchester Ship Canal.

The island was originally Runcorn saltmarsh. When the Manchester Ship Canal was cut through Runcorn the island was physically detached from the town and stranded between the canal and the River Mersey. Wigg is not formally an island, as it is not surrounded on all sides by water. A strip of land separates the canal and the river. The strip ensures the canal stays in water and has a cycle path leading from Wigg to Port Warrington and Moore Nature Reserve.

== History ==
The island is named after Charles Wigg, who started an alkali works there in the 1860s to extract copper from its ore. The factory was known as "Wigg works" and in 1890 it was bought by the United Alkali Company. This company was bought by ICI in 1926 and the original Wigg works was closed to make way for a new chemical factory on the site.

A second factory was built by a company called the Chemical and Metallugical Corporation and in 1933 this too was bought by ICI. During the Second World War this factory became a centre for the production of mustard gas. It was known as "Wigg Works East" and was later called Randles. After the war ICI continued operations until the 1960s, when all production ceased. The area had become heavily polluted with a diverse range of chemicals.

A community park was opened on 19 April 2002 by the Mayor of Halton and Bill Oddie.

== Facilities ==
The nature reserve covers 23 hectares (57 acres) and is used by birdwatchers. Bee Orchids are among the wild flowers found there. It is managed by Halton Borough Council. It was made a Local Nature Reserve in 2004 and is a holder of Keep Britain Tidy's Green Flag Award. The Mersey Gateway Bridge passes over the island.

== See also ==
- List of parks and open spaces in Cheshire
