= John & Thomas Johnson =

John & Thomas Johnson was a soap and alkali manufacturing business in Runcorn, Cheshire, England during the 19th century.

John and Thomas Johnson were brothers after whom the business was named. Their father, also named John Johnson, had established a soapery on the south bank of the Bridgewater Canal near the centre of the town of Runcorn in 1803. He died in 1816 at the age of 37 and the business was run by the Liverpool firm of Hayes, Ollier & Co until the elder son, John came of age. He was joined by his younger brother Thomas when he too came of age.
