= Runcorn =

Coordinates: 53.3417°N 2.7313°W

- Town
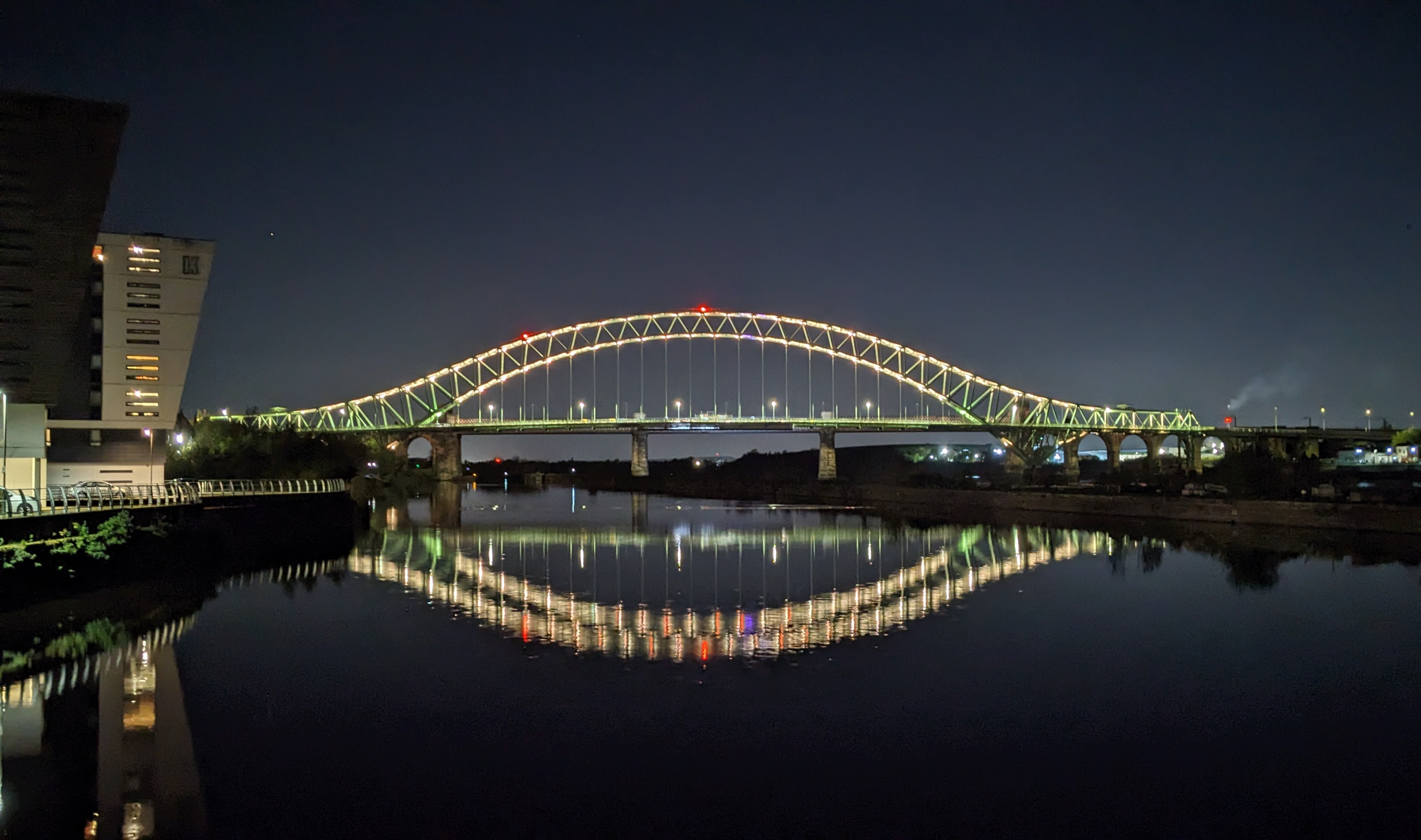
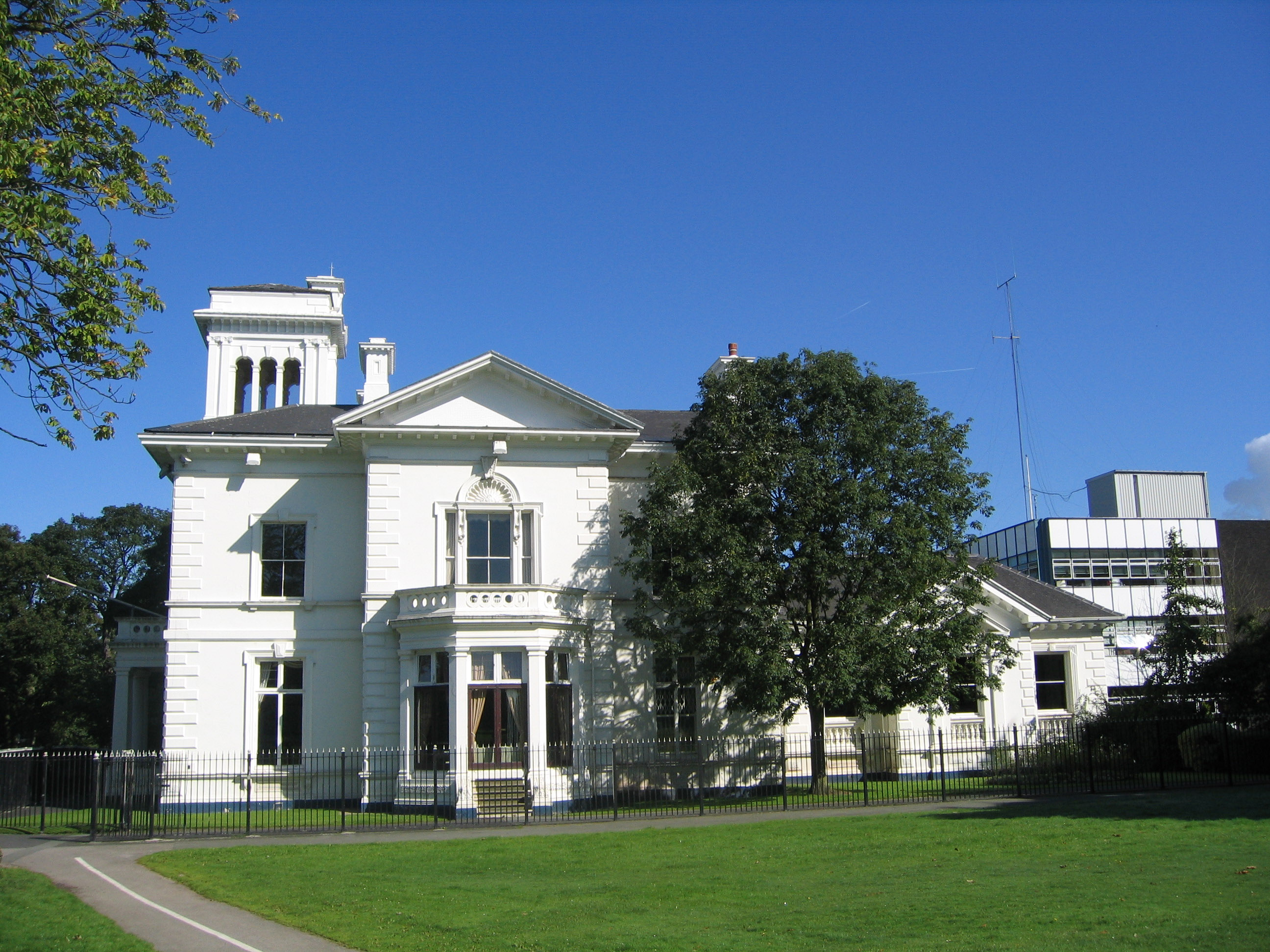
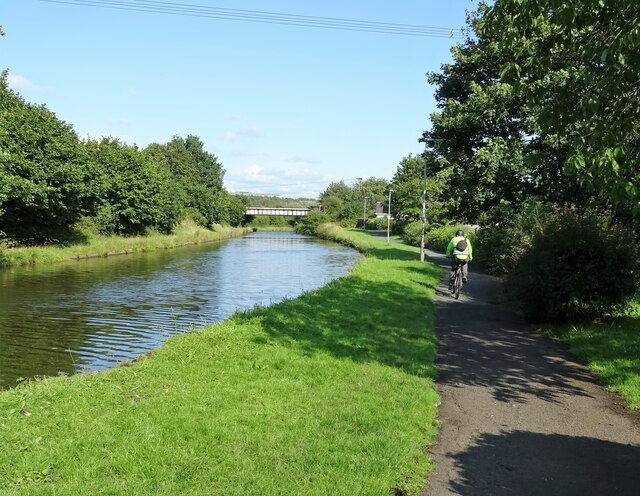
- The Silver Jubilee Bridge Town Hall Bridgewater Canal

- Location within Cheshire
- Population: 61,145 (Built-up area, 2021)
- OS grid reference: SJ 5140 8300
  - London: 167 mi (269 km) SE
- Unitary authority: Halton
- Ceremonial county: Cheshire
- Region: North West
- Country: England
- Sovereign state: United Kingdom
- Post town: RUNCORN
- Postcode district: WA7
- Dialling code: 01928
- Police: Cheshire
- Fire: Cheshire
- Ambulance: North West
- UK Parliament: Runcorn and Helsby

Runcorn is an industrial town and cargo port within the Borough of Halton in Cheshire, England. It lies on the south bank of the River Mersey, where the estuary narrows to form the Runcorn Gap, and is located approximately 15 miles (24 km) southeast of Liverpool and 29 miles (47 km) southwest of Manchester. The Runcorn built-up area had a population of 61,145 at the 2021 census.

Runcorn was founded by Æthelflæd of Mercia in 915 AD as a fortification against the Viking invasion at a narrowing of the River Mersey. Under Norman rule, Runcorn fell under the Barony of Halton and an Augustinian abbey was established there in 1115. It remained a small and isolated settlement until the Industrial Revolution, when the 1776 extension of the Bridgewater Canal to Runcorn established it as a port linking coastal Liverpool with inland Manchester and Staffordshire. The docks enabled the growth of industry, initially shipwrights and sandstone quarries; in the late 18th and early 19th centuries, it was a spa and health resort, but this ended with the growth of polluting industries, especially soap and chemical works. In 1964, Runcorn was designated a new town and expanded eastward, absorbing neighbouring settlements and more than doubling its population.

The Silver Jubilee Bridge, Mersey Gateway, and Runcorn Railway Bridge span the River Mersey and the Manchester Ship Canal in Runcorn. Its location between Liverpool and Manchester and its links to the rail, motorway, and canal networks have made it a major centre for the manufacturing, logistics, and wholesale and retail industries.

== History ==
=== Early history ===
The earliest written reference to the town is in the Anglo-Saxon Chronicle, where it is spelled "Rumcofan", literally meaning "a wide cove or bay". This word is derived from the Old English words "rúm" ("wide" or "broad") and "cofa" ("cave" or "cove"). Other historical spellings of Runcorn include "Rumcoven", "Ronchestorn", "Runckhorne", and "Runcorne".

Little is known about the early history of the settlement but isolated findings of objects from the Stone, Bronze, and Iron Ages have been made and there is evidence of a Roman presence in the area.

The first recorded event in its history is the building by Æthelflæd of a fortification at Runcorn to protect the northern frontier of her kingdom of Mercia against the Vikings in 915. The fort was built on Castle Rock overlooking the River Mersey at Runcorn Gap.

=== Medieval ===
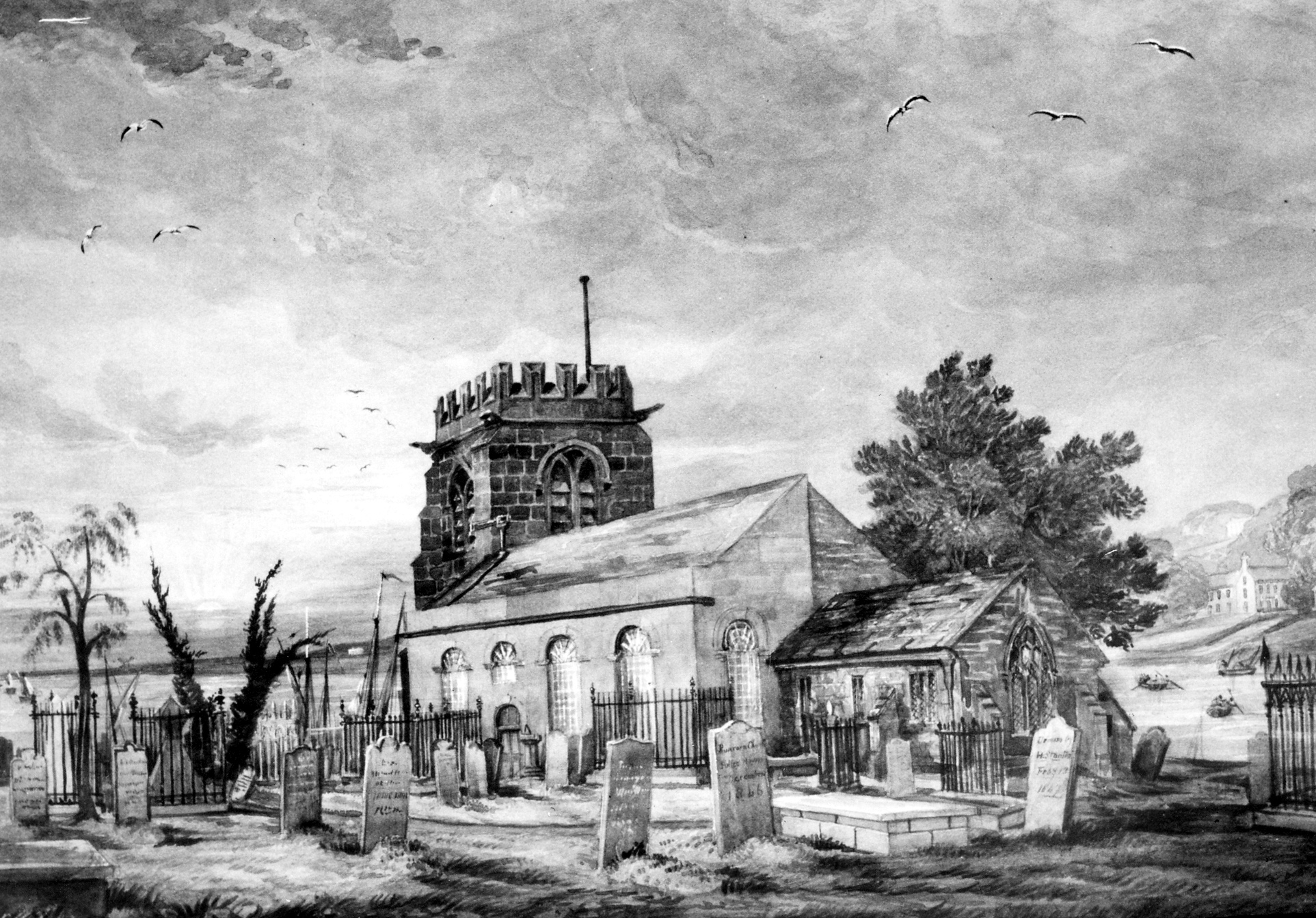
Runcorn's medieval parish church, demolished and rebuilt 1847–1849 as All Saints' Church

Following the Norman Conquest, Runcorn was not mentioned in the 1086 Domesday survey, although surrounding settlements were. William the Conqueror granted the earldom of Chester to Hugh d'Avranches, who granted the barony of Halton to Nigel of Cotentin. It is likely that Nigel erected a motte and bailey castle on Halton Hill in the 1070s.

In 1115, Nigel's son, William fitz Nigel, founded an Augustinian priory at Runcorn. In 1134, the priory was moved to Norton, about 3 1/2 miles (6 kilometres) away. In 1391, the priory was raised to the higher status of abbey. In 1536, the monastery was dissolved, and around nine years later, the buildings and some of the monastic lands were sold to Sir Richard Brooke who converted the habitable part of the abbey into a house.

In 1565, Rocksavage, an Elizabethan Hall, was constructed for Sir John Savage in Clifton, now part of Runcorn.

=== English Civil War ===
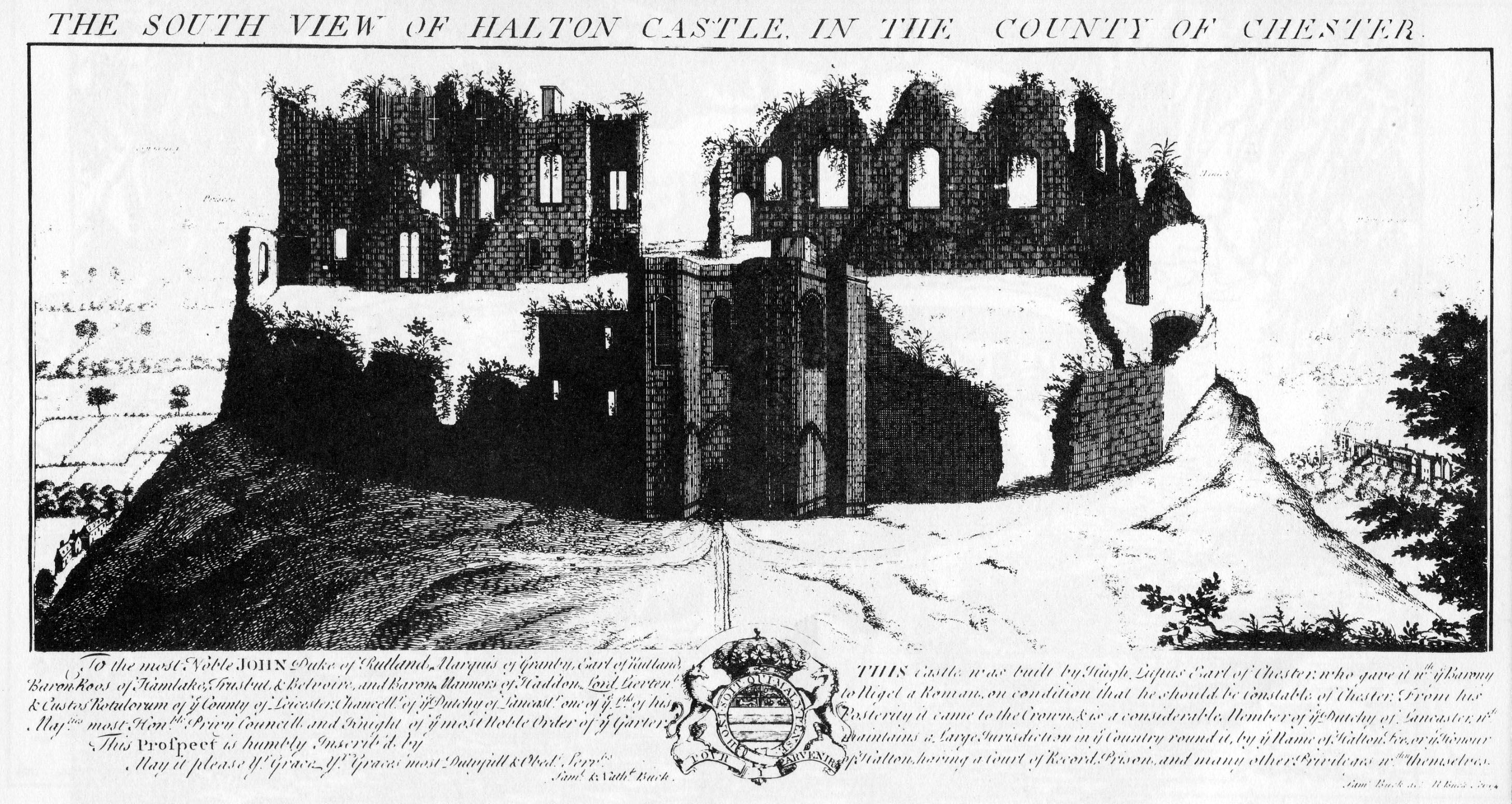
An engraving of the slighted Halton Castle in the 18th century

During the Civil War, Halton Castle was held for the Royalists by John Savage, 2nd Earl Rivers, the Steward of Halton. It fell twice to Parliamentarian Roundheads. The first siege was led by Sir William Brereton in 1643; the second was in 1644. Following this, a "Council of War" was held in Warrington in 1646 at which it was decided that the castle should be slighted.

In 1656, Runcorn was described as "nothing but a fair parish church, a parsonage and a few scattered tenements". And so it remained for over a century; an isolated and poor hamlet. The only through traffic used the ferry which crossed from Runcorn to the north bank of the River Mersey.

=== Industrialisation ===
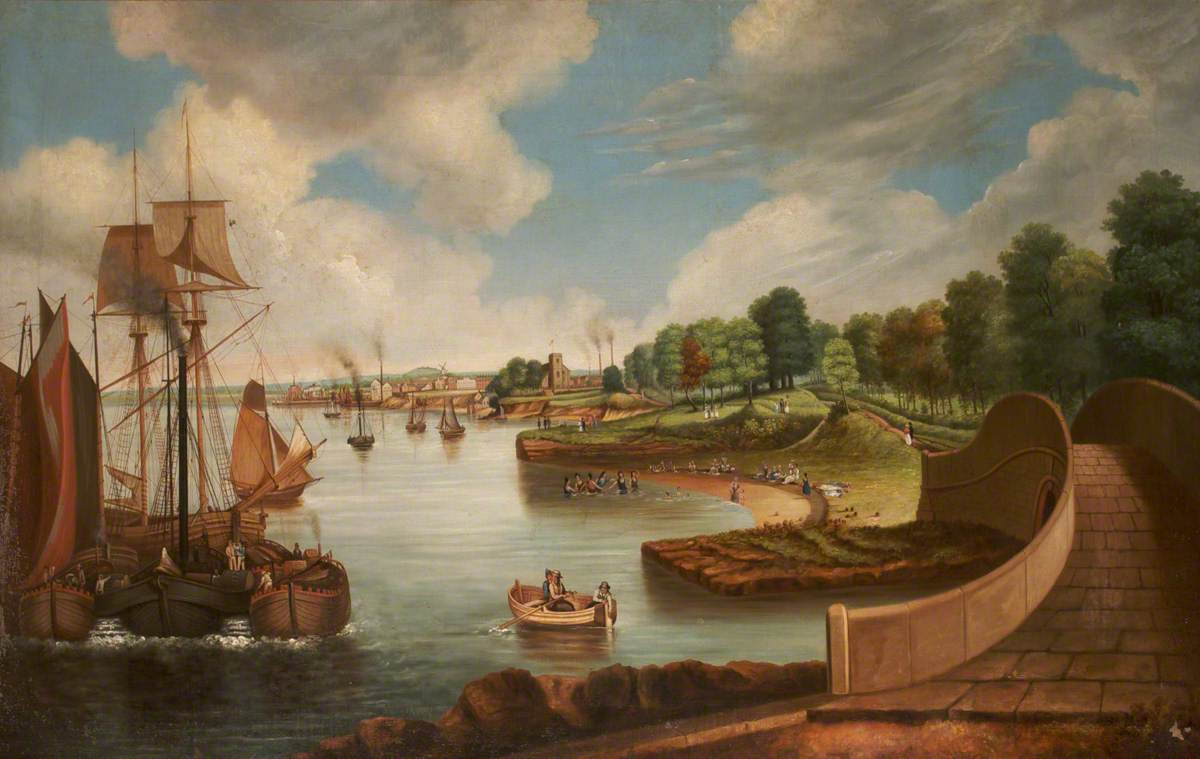
Painting c. 1830 depicting bathing parties in the River Mersey with the beginnings of industrialisation in the background.

During the 18th century, water transport had been improved in the area by the Mersey and Irwell Navigation, the Bridgewater Canal and the Trent and Mersey Canal. This gave Runcorn waterway connections with most of the interior of England through the canal system and with the sea along the River Mersey, thus forming the basis for the development of the Port of Runcorn. Later came the Runcorn to Latchford Canal linking with the Mersey and Irwell Navigation, and the Weston Canal which gave better access to the Weaver Navigation system. Industries began to develop within and around the town, in particular shipbuilding, engineering, chemical manufacturing, tanning, and sandstone quarrying.

Towards the end of the 18th century and in the early years of the 19th century, the town was a health resort. The growth of industry did not diminish Runcorn's late 18th and early 19th century reputation as a health resort and the "Montpelier of England". In 1822 the town's first Saltwater Baths opened followed by new visitor accommodation in Belvedere Terrace in 1831. In the middle of the century, the growing wealth of the town and its industrialists saw the construction of several new landmarks, including Halton Grange, St Paul's Methodist Chapel and All Saints' Church.

Runcorn was becoming an industrialised and highly polluted town. During the later 19th century the town became increasingly dominated by the chemical and tanning industries. In the 1880s a pipeline was opened between Northwich and Weston Point, supplying brine to the salt works and in 1896 the Castner Kellner chemical works was established. In 1894 the Manchester Ship Canal was opened throughout its length. This allowed ocean-going ships to travel inland as far as Salford, some of them calling at the port of Runcorn. The rise in population between 1881 and 1891 and the drop by 1901 is explained by the number of people involved in constructing the ship canal.

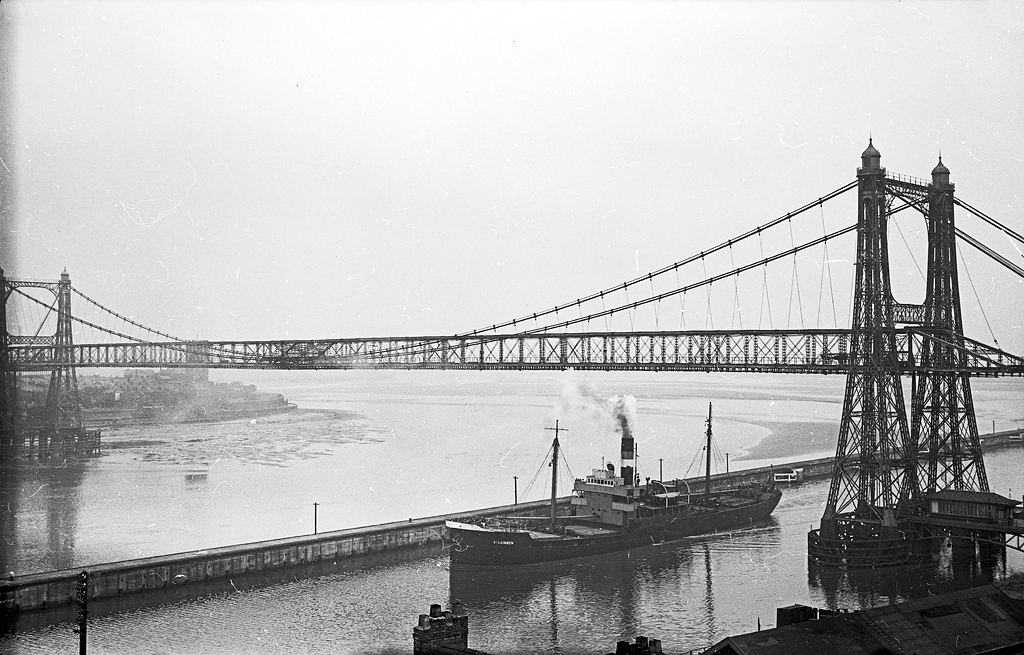
Runcorn Transporter Bridge c. 1952

For hundreds of years, the only means of crossing the River Mersey at this point had been by the Runcorn ferry. Thomas Telford proposed a 1,000 ft (300 m) single span suspension bridge as early as 1817, but not until 1868 did the first bridge, Runcorn Railway Bridge, open across the Mersey at Runcorn. This gave the town direct rail links with Liverpool and the rest of the country. In 1905, the Widnes–Runcorn Transporter Bridge opened, giving a direct link for vehicular traffic for the first time between the two towns. This would not be replaced until 1961 with the construction of Runcorn Road Bridge (since renamed the Silver Jubilee Bridge) which allowed a more efficient means of road traffic across Runcorn Gap.

During the first half of the 20th century, the town's industry continued to be dominated by chemicals and tanning. This growth was largely due to government fixed-priced cost contracts for tanned hides. In 1926, four chemical companies merged to form Imperial Chemical Industries (ICI). In 1937, ICI began to build a new factory for mustard gas production at their Randle plant on Wigg Island. The ICI chemical plants at Runcorn featured in the Gestapo Black Book as a company of special interest but although the works at Weston Point were discussed at Luftwaffe briefings in 1940, the town was never deliberately targeted and was subject only to very limited bombing. During the second half of the 20th century, the tanneries closed (the last to close was the Highfield Tannery in the late 1960s) and the chemical industry declined. At the same time, light industry developed together with warehouses and distribution centres.

=== New Town development ===
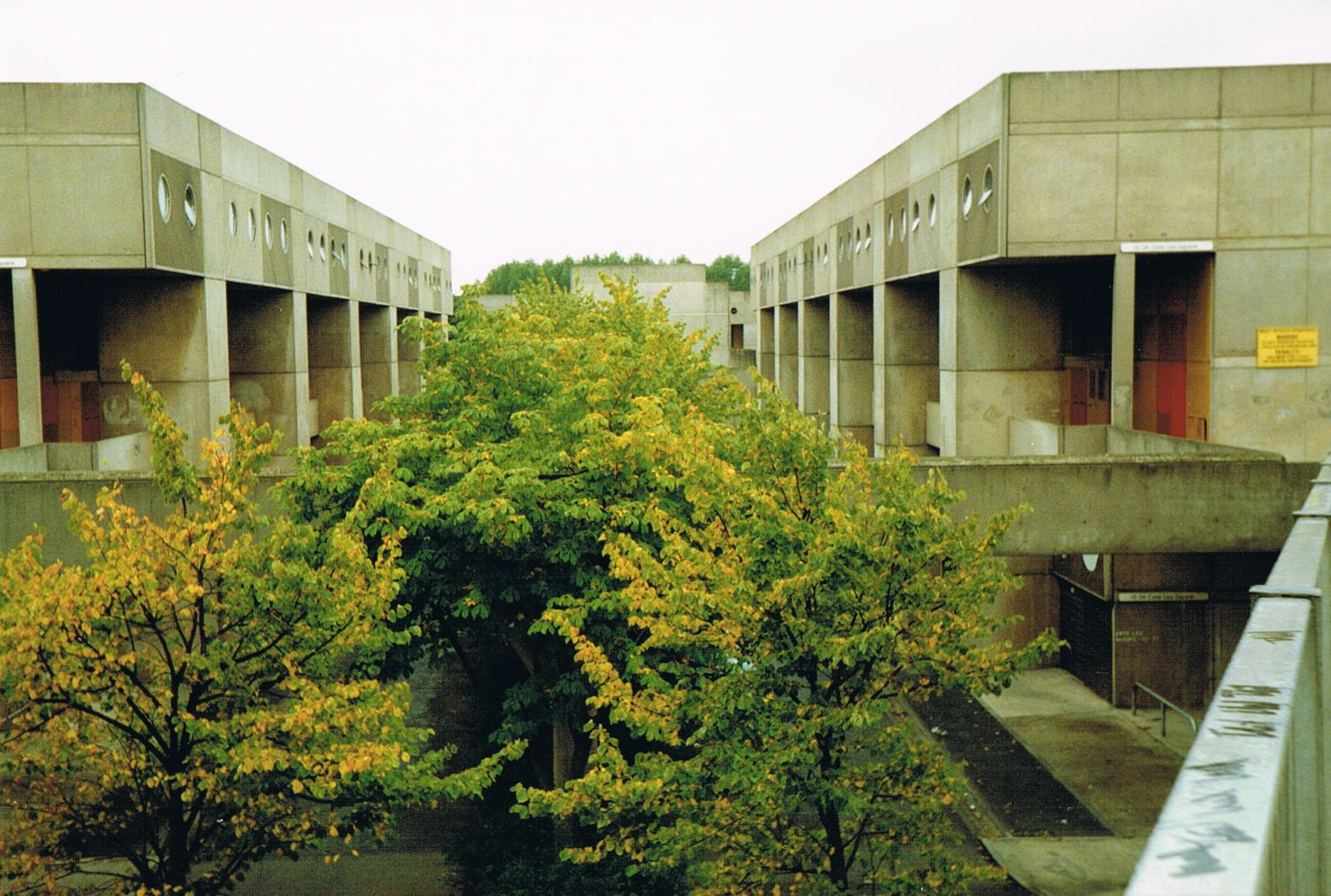
The ill-fated Southgate Estate in Runcorn New Town

In September 1963, the Ministry of Housing and Local Government published a draft of the Runcorn New Town (Designation) Order that allocated 7,750 acres (3,140 ha) in and around Runcorn for development of a new town under the New Towns Act 1946. The ministry cited the urgent need for more housing to reduce overcrowding in Liverpool and to increase the rate of slum clearance there. Runcorn was chosen because of its strong road, rail and canal connections, ample water supply, convenient location on the Mersey Estuary for the disposal of effluent, established industry and the availability of land for more.

Following objections to the draft order, a public Local Inquiry was held at Runcorn from 10 to 12 December 1963. The subsequent report accepted the location in principle and the proposed population of 90,000. But it recommended that 500 acres (200 ha) around the village of Sutton Weaver to the south of the Chester–Manchester and Crewe–Liverpool railway lines be excluded from the designated area, partly to preserve its highly productive agricultural land. The minister, Keith Joseph, accepted the report's recommendations and the designation order was made on 10 April 1964.

The New Town masterplan of 1967 more than doubled the population as it encompassed neighbouring settlements and created new housing estates to the south and east. The new town's key features were its unique housing and estate designs, segregated pedestrian pathways, Busway, extensive landscaped green space, separate industrial areas, and new town centre.

The new town centre was designated at the geographical heart of the expanded town with Shopping City, an American-style enclosed mall, as its focus. This was a source of conflict between Arthur Ling, the new town Master Planner, and Fred Roche, Chief Architect. Ling envisaged a centre reminiscent of a citadel or acropolis at the base of Halton Castle, but Roche preferred to expand the existing town centre, partly to placate the Urban District Council and existing traders. The new Halton site was favoured and Shopping City opened in 1972.

However, the Urban District Council secured a commitment from the Development Corporation to continue a programme of regeneration the council had already begun. In 1971, the Development Corporation published Master Plan Amendment No.1, which focused on the urban renewal of the Old Town centre, now designated a smaller 'district centre'. The plan sought to increase public open space, reduce shopping provision, rationalise roads, and renew housing stock. It also included plans to widen the Runcorn-Widnes Bridge from two to four lanes and create a new system of junctions between the bridge and the expressway.

The masterplan was amended for the second and final time in 1975. Amendment No.2 extended the expressway further to the east and redesignated land at Sandymoor intended for industrial use to residential. The Runcorn Development Corporation merged with Warrington Development Corporation on 1 April 1981 and was wound up on 30 September 1989.

Much of the architecture of the new town was innovative, especially the Southgate development designed by Sir James Stirling and built between 1970 and 1977. Stirling's housing development was beset with problems and it was demolished in the early 1990s. In 2002, the Castlefields Partnership (made up of English Partnerships and Halton Borough Council) was created to comprehensively redevelop the Castlefields estate, including the demolition of over 700 deck access flats.

== Governance ==
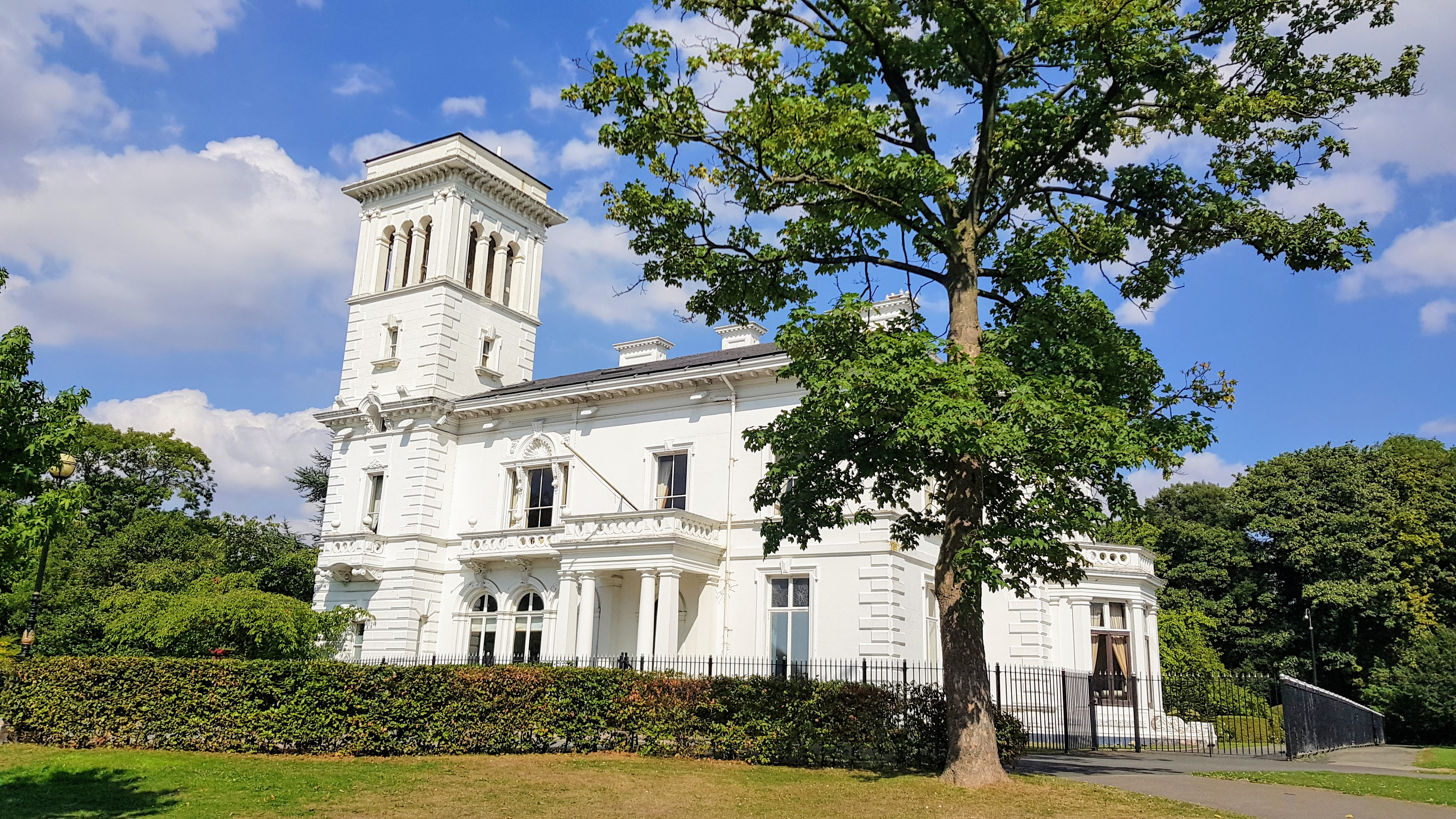
Runcorn Town Hall, formerly Halton Grange

Runcorn is in the local authority district of the Borough of Halton. It is administered by Halton Borough Council, a unitary authority which has its main meeting place at Runcorn Town Hall. The council is a member of the Liverpool City Region Combined Authority, led by the directly elected Mayor of the Liverpool City Region. Runcorn is an unparished area with the exception of Sandymoor civil parish and part of the Whitehouse Industrial Estate which is in the Preston Brook civil parish.

=== Administrative history ===
At the time of the Domesday survey of 1086, Runcorn was in the hundred of Tunendune. The hundreds of Cheshire were reorganised in the 12th century, and Runcorn became part of the Bucklow Hundred. Runcorn was an ancient parish. It was subdivided into 20 townships:

- Acton Grange
- Aston Grange
- Aston-by-Sutton
- Clifton
- Daresbury
- Dutton (part)
- Halton
- Hatton
- Keckwick
- Moore
- Newton by Daresbury
- Norton
- Preston on the Hill
- Runcorn
- Stockham
- Sutton
- Thelwall
- Walton Inferior
- Walton Superior
- Weston

Coat of arms granted to Runcorn Urban District Council in 1956

The Runcorn township covered the town itself plus a rural area to the south, including the separate hamlet of Higher Runcorn and an area of heath called Runcorn Heath. From the 17th century onwards, parishes were gradually given various civil functions under the poor laws, in addition to their original ecclesiastical functions. In some cases, including Runcorn, the civil functions were exercised by each township separately rather than the parish as a whole. In 1866, the legal definition of 'parish' was changed to be the areas used for administering the poor laws, and so the townships also became civil parishes, which therefore diverged from the ecclesiastical parish.

In 1852 a body of improvement commissioners was established to administer the Runcorn township and adjoining parts of Halton township (which were subsequently transferred to Runcorn township in 1883). Such commissioners' districts were reconstituted as urban districts under the Local Government Act 1894. In 1932, Runcorn Urban District Council bought Halton Grange, a large house which had been completed in 1856, to serve as its headquarters and renamed it Runcorn Town Hall.

Runcorn Urban District was enlarged on three occasions. In 1936, it took in areas including Weston and the fringes of Halton, including the area around Halton Grange. In 1955, there were minor adjustments to the boundaries with neighbouring parishes. And in 1967, it took in Halton and Norton, plus parts of other neighbouring parishes, to bring all the areas which had been designated for the new town in 1964 into the urban district. In 1956, the urban district council was granted a coat of arms with the Latin motto Navem mercibus implere ("fill the ships with goods"), a classical quotation from Juvenal.

Runcorn Urban District was abolished in 1974 under the Local Government Act 1972 when it merged with the Municipal Borough of Widnes and parts of Runcorn Rural District and Whiston Rural District to form the Borough of Halton under Halton Borough Council and Cheshire County Council. In 1998, Halton Borough Council took over the county council's functions in the borough, making it a unitary authority. Halton remains part of the ceremonial county of Cheshire. In April 2014, Halton Borough Council joined five other local authorities in Merseyside to form the Liverpool City Region.

=== Westminster representation ===
Runcorn is in the Runcorn and Helsby constituency for representation in the House of Commons. The seat was held by Mike Amesbury of the Labour Party from its creation for the 2024 general election. It changed hands when Sarah Pochin of Reform UK won the 2025 by-election triggered by Amesbury's resignation after his conviction for assault.

From 1997 to 2024, Runcorn was split between the two constituencies of Weaver Vale and Halton. Prior to their abolition, those seats were held by Mike Amesbury and Derek Twigg respectively, both of the Labour Party. While Halton was a safe Labour seat since its creation in 1983, Weaver Vale was a marginal seat and switched between the Labour and Conservative parties several times since its creation in 1997.

Before the Reform Act 1832, Runcorn was in the constituency of Cheshire which was represented by two Members of Parliament. Following the Reform Act, the town was placed in the North Cheshire constituency and from 1868 in the Mid Cheshire constituency. From 1885 to 1950 the town was in the constituency of Northwich. The constituency of Runcorn was created by a 1948 Act of Parliament and Dennis Vosper was the first to be elected to the seat in 1950. In 1964, he was succeeded by Mark Carlisle who held the seat until the constituency of Runcorn was abolished in 1983 and split between the constituencies of Halton and Warrington South.

== Geography ==
=== Topography ===
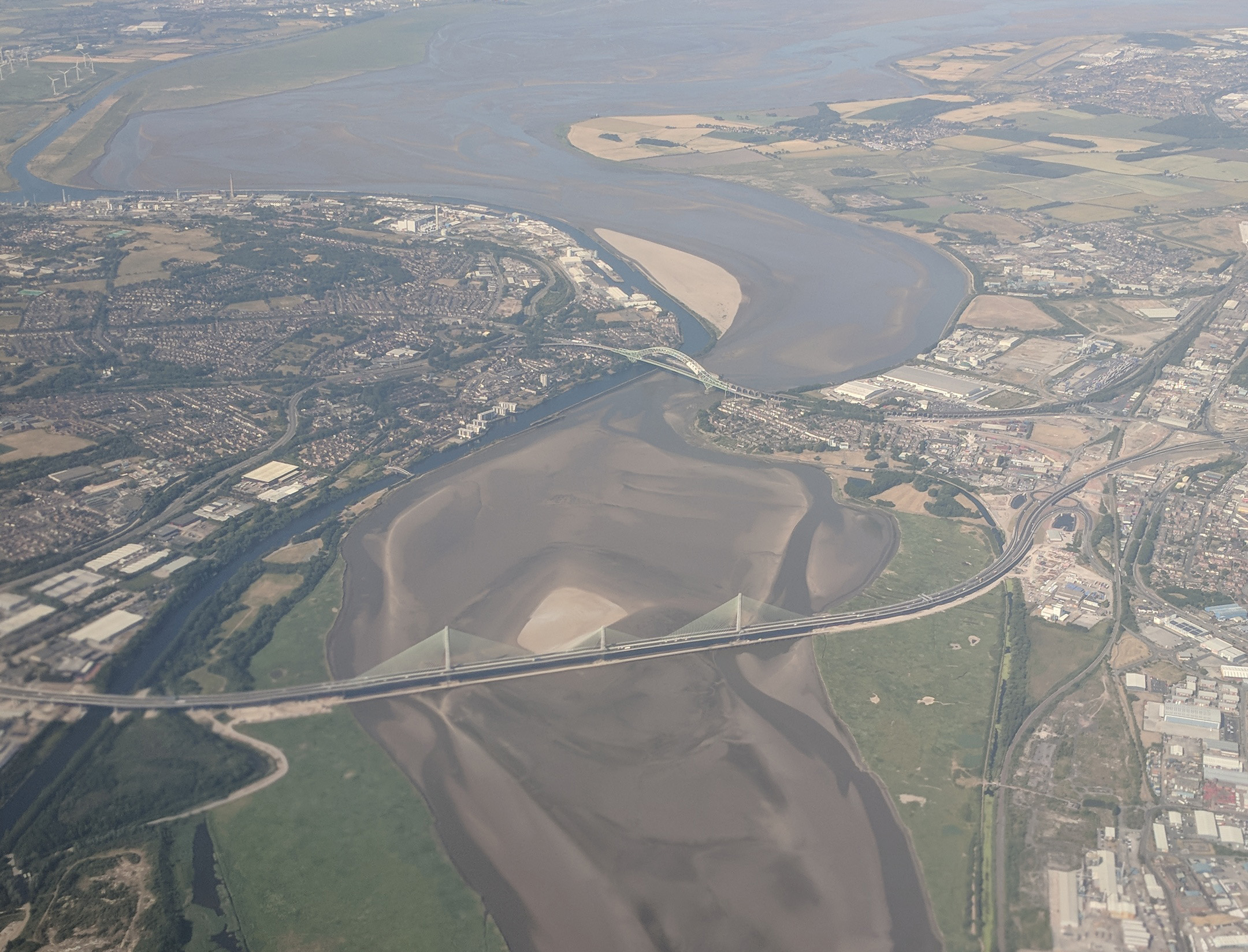
Aerial view of the Runcorn Gap

Runcorn is on a spur projecting into the River Mersey, which flows to the north and then to the west of the town. On the river's north bank is another spur forming the West Bank area of Widnes; together these form Runcorn Gap, a narrowing of the River Mersey. The town is bounded to the southwest by the Weaver Navigation; to the south by the Chester–Manchester and Crewe–Liverpool railway lines; and to the east by the West Coast Main Line until the village of Moore. A series of valleys is formed by high points at Runcorn Hill (75m AOD), Halton Castle (75m AOD), Windmill Hill (70m AOD) and Keckwick Hill (75m AOD).

Runcorn Gap is crossed by three bridges: Runcorn Railway Bridge (which carries the Liverpool branch of the West Coast Main Line), the Silver Jubilee Bridge and the Mersey Gateway which carries the A533. A system of dual carriageways called 'expressways' form a figure of 8 around the town. The Central Expressway runs through the centre of the town in a north–south direction and is the main through-road. It connects to the M56 motorway which cuts into the south of the town.

To the west of the Central Expressway lies the Old Town of Runcorn, Higher Runcorn, Weston, Weston Point and Clifton (formerly Rocksavage), and the new town estates of Halton Brook and Halton Lodge. To the east are the formerly separate villages of Halton and Norton, and the new town estates of Castlefields, Palacefields, Windmill Hill, Murdishaw, Brookvale, Hallwood Park, Beechwood and Sandymoor. The density of housing is generally high, but there are open green areas, in particular heathland on Runcorn Hill and the extensive Town Park created as part of the new town. Housing is typically situated within the expressways and industry outside.

=== Geology ===
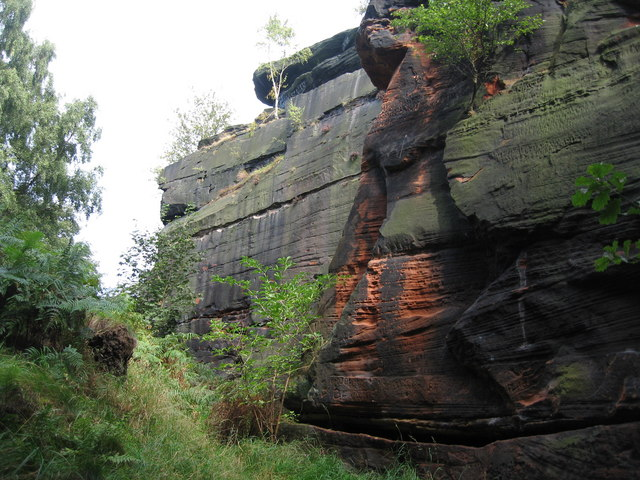
The former sandstone quarry at Runcorn Hill

The Runcorn area drains into the River Mersey to the north and the River Weaver to the south.

The bedrock geology of the River Mersey and the northern and western fringes of Runcorn is Sherwood Sandstone and pebbly sandstone. To the south there is a transition to siltstone, sandstone and predominantly Mercia Mudstone. The primary sedimentary rock is New Red Sandstone.

The superficial geology is varied with pockets of sand and diamicton along the lower-lying land adjacent to the Mersey and through Runcorn. Sand and gravel becomes common on the southern fringes of the town and elsewhere there are small pockets of clay, silt, sand and gravel.

=== Ecology ===
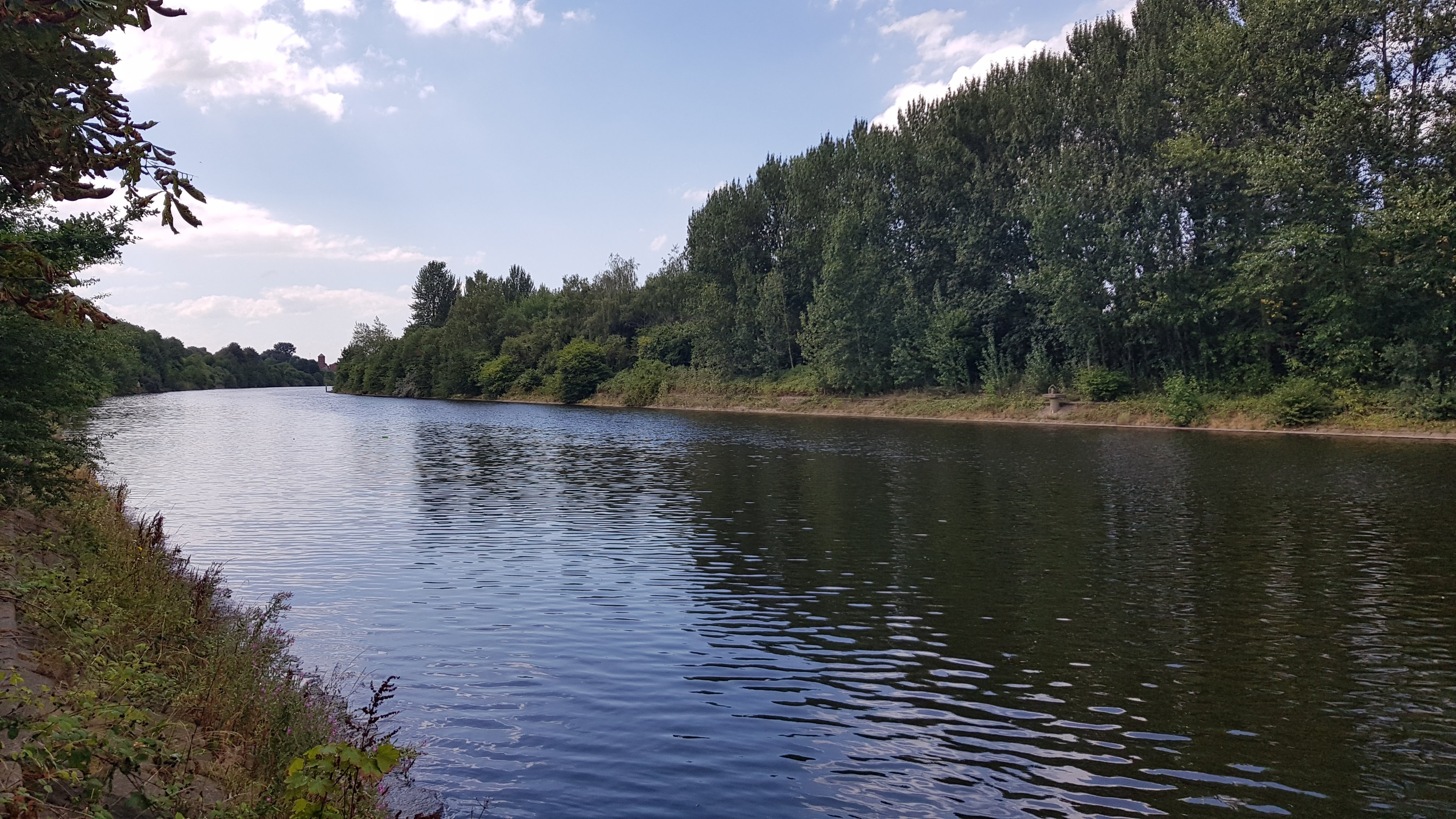
Wigg Island local nature reserve across the Manchester Ship Canal

There are two Sites of Special Scientific Interest within the town: Floodbrook Clough and the Mersey Estuary. Floodbrook Clough in Beechwood is an Ancient Semi-Natural Woodland and one of the best examples in Cheshire of clough woodland on keuper marl.

There are five Local Nature Reserves designated under the National Parks and Access to the Countryside Act 1949: Runcorn Hill, Dorchester Park, Oxmoor Woods, Wigg Island and Murdishaw Valley.

== Demography ==
=== Population growth ===
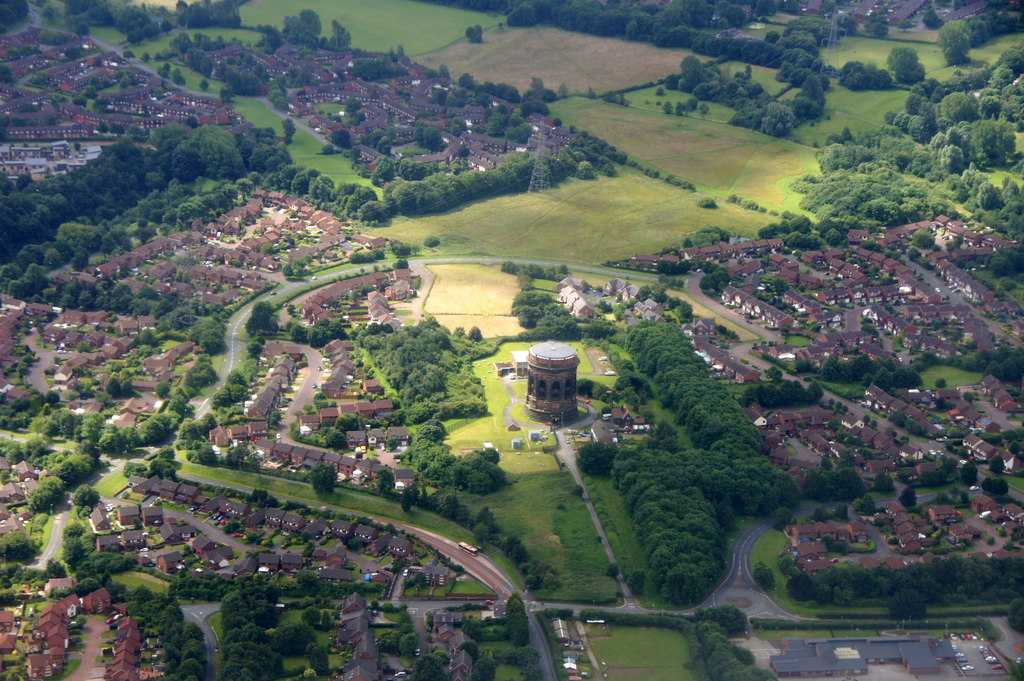
Housing developments in the east of the town with Norton Water Tower in the centre.

Early census statistics for the town include only the areas known now as the Old Town and Higher Runcorn. In 1936, Runcorn Urban District grew to incorporate the neighbouring village of Weston. The present statistical boundaries of Runcorn were defined in the Runcorn New Town (Designation) Order 1964 which greatly expanded the town to the east.

The population of Runcorn in 1664 has been estimated as 305.

Population growth of Runcorn since 1801
Year	Population	Change as %
1801	1,379	—
1811	2,060	+49.4%
1821	3,103	+50.6%
1831	5,035	+62.3%
1841	6,951	+38.1%
1851	8,688	+25.0%
1861	10,063	+15.8%
1871	12,066	+19.9%
1881	15,126	+25.4%
1891	20,020	+32.4%
1901	16,491	−17.6%
1911	17,353	+5.2%
1921	18,476	+6.5%
1931	18,127	−1.9%
1939	21,718	+19.8%
1951	23,931	+10.2%
1961	26,035	+8.8%
1971	35,999	+38.3%
1981	64,196	+78.3%
1991	64,952	+1.2%
2001	60,320	−7.1%
2011	61,789	+2.4%
2021	61,145	+0.5%

=== Religion ===
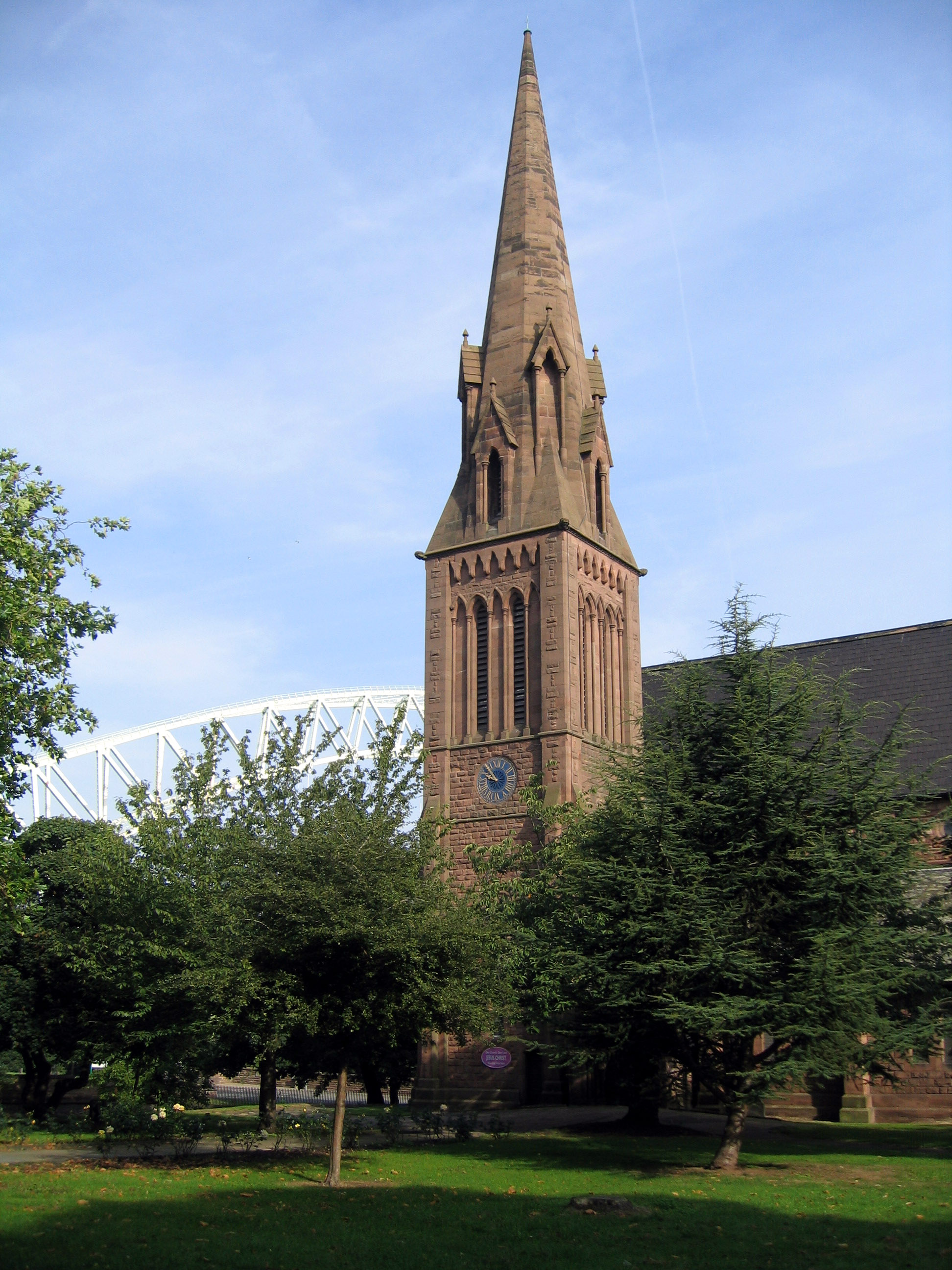
All Saints' Parish Church

In the 2021 census, 52.5% said they were Christian, down from 70.1% in 2011. 41.5% said they had "no religion" and 4.6% made no religious claims. Those stating their religions as Buddhist, Hindu, Jewish, Muslim, Sikh or other amounted to 1.3%.

The town's Anglican churches are part of the Diocese of Chester and the Deanery of Frodsham. The parish church is All Saints Church, and there are 10 other Anglican churches in the town. Five Catholic churches can be found in Runcorn and are administered by the Diocese of Shrewsbury.

There are two Methodist chapels and several shared churches. Wicksten Drive Christian Centre is shared between Anglicans and Methodists. Hallwood Ecumenical Parish in Beechwood and Palace Fields consists of two churches, both recognised by the Church of England, the Methodist Church and the United Reformed Church. There is also a Pentecostal church, two independent evangelical churches, a Church of Jesus Christ of Latter-day Saints chapel, a spiritualist church, and a Jehovah's Witnesses Kingdom Hall.

In 2013, the former Waterloo Hotel was converted into a Buddhist temple by Wat Phra Singh. As of May 2014, there are five resident monks.

=== Ethnicity ===
In the 2021 census, of Runcorn's 61,145 residents, 96.6% identified as White. Mixed/multiple ethnic groups made up 1.5%; Asian/Asian British/Asian Welsh 1.0%; Black/Black British/Black Welsh/Caribbean/African 0.4%; and Other ethnic group 0.6%. 97.4% had English as a first language.

== Economy ==
In 2020, the GVA for the Runcorn Built-up Area Sub-division was £2.86 billion.

Runcorn has a higher proportion of people working in manufacturing, logistics, and wholesale and retail than the average for England. Chemical manufacturing has been the town's dominant sector since the 19th century, but the local economy has increasingly diversified into other advanced manufacturing sectors, such as aerospace and automotive, as well as services and logistics.

The main industrial areas of the town are Astmoor, Manor Park, Whitehouse, the Heath and Weston Point. Sci-Tech Daresbury is to the southeast of the town. The main retail and leisure area is Shopping City in the centre of the town with a smaller district centre at the old town.

Employment by industry in 2011
Industry	Runcorn (Resident Jobs)	Runcorn (%)	Halton (%)	England (%)	Runcorn – England Difference
C Manufacturing	3,829	13.7	12.5	8.8	4.9
H Transport and storage	2,087	7.4	6.9	5.0	2.4
G Wholesale and retail trade; repair of motor vehicles and motor cycles	5,069	18.1	18.7	15.9	2.2
N Administrative and support service activities	1,579	5.6	5.3	4.9	0.7
E Water supply; sewerage, waste management and remediation activities	334	1.2	1.6	0.7	0.5
J Information and communication	1,247	4.4	3.9	4.1	0.3
O Public administration and defence; compulsory social security	1,721	6.1	6.5	5.9	0.2
D Electricity, gas, steam and air conditioning supply	194	0.7	0.8	0.6	0.1
Q Human health and social work activities	3,460	12.3	12.0	12.4	−0.1
B Mining and quarrying	40	0.1	0.2	0.2	−0.1
L Real estate activities	314	1.1	1.2	1.5	−0.4
I Accommodation and food service activities	1,388	5.0	4.6	5.6	−0.6
A Agriculture, forestry and fishing	44	0.2	0.2	0.8	−0.6
F Construction	1,881	6.7	7.4	7.7	−1.0
R, S, T, U Other	988	3.5	3.8	5.0	−1.5
M Professional, scientific and technical activities	1,305	4.7	4.5	6.7	−2.0
K Financial and insurance activities	555	2.0	2.4	4.4	−2.4
P Education	1,993	7.1	7.7	9.9	−2.8

=== Manufacturing and chemicals ===
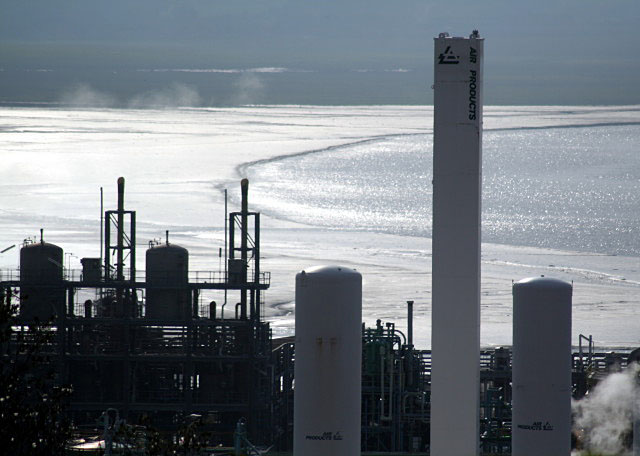
Chemical works at Weston Point, Runcorn

The town's chemical industry was dominated for many years by ICI's Chlor Chemical division. But since 2001, Inovyn (a wholly owned subsidiary of Ineos) has operated the extensive chemical works in the west of the town, employing 750 people in 2020. In Runcorn, Invoyn manufactures chlorine, caustic soda and chlorinated derivatives. It also produces salt, made from brine transported by pipeline from the saltfields of central Cheshire, and sulphuric acid. Several other chemical manufacturers also have a presence at the site, including Koura (formerly Mexichem Fluor), Industrial Chemicals, Packed Chlorine Limited, VYNOVA and Runcorn MCP Ltd (a joint venture between INOVYN and VYNOVA). The chlorine produced at INOVYN's Runcorn plant purifies 98% of UK drinking water, and the site is considered to be of strategic national importance to the UK. The site includes two independently owned power stations; the 810 MW natural gas fired Rocksavage Power Station and the Runcorn Energy Recovery Facility operated by Viridor which also supplies heat to the Inovyn facility. ICI's other former site in Runcorn comprising offices and laboratories is now the Heath Business and Technical Park, which provides office, laboratory, conference, and leisure facilities.

Other large employers include advanced manufacturing firms Sigmatex (manufacturer of carbon fibre), Héroux-Devtek (manufacturer of aircraft landing gear), Whitford (manufacturer of speciality coatings), Teva (manufacturer of pharmaceuticals) and Fresenius Kabi (manufacturer of medical and pharmaceutical products). Drinks manufacturer Diageo has maintained a packaging plant at Runcorn since 1970 which packages Guinness, Pimm's, Kilkenny and Smirnoff Ice for distribution in Great Britain.

Sci-Tech Daresbury is a National Science and Innovation Campus to the south east of Runcorn. The campus offers lab space, offices and workshops to rent. It is home to Europe's largest supercomputer and the Virtual Engineering Centre. The site also houses Daresbury Laboratory, which employs over 300 staff specialising in accelerator science, bio-medicine, physics, chemistry, materials, engineering, and computational science.

=== Logistics ===
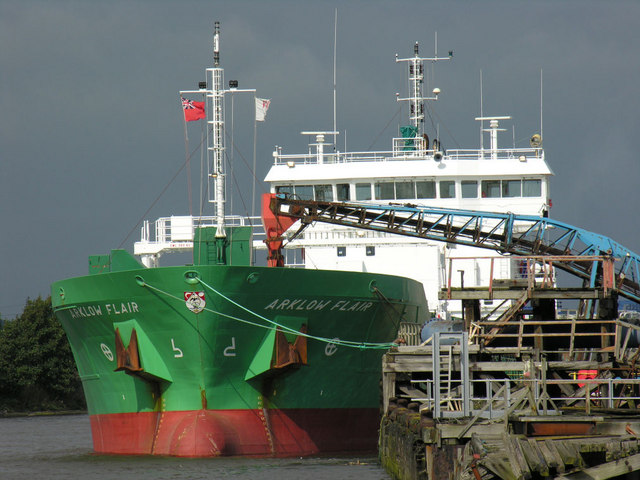
Salt loading at Runcorn Docks

Runcorn's position between Liverpool and Manchester airports and its links to the rail, motorway, and canal networks have made it a centre for logistics. There are two ports in the west of the town on the Manchester Ship Canal. Runcorn Docks is owned by the Manchester Ship Canal Company, which is part of the Peel Ports Group. Weston Point Docks is operated by FLX Logistics.

There are several large logistics depots across Runcorn, including Eddie Stobart Group's road haulage site and driver training school in Manor Park, and the Downton haulage depot at the Whitehouse Industrial Estate.

=== Services ===
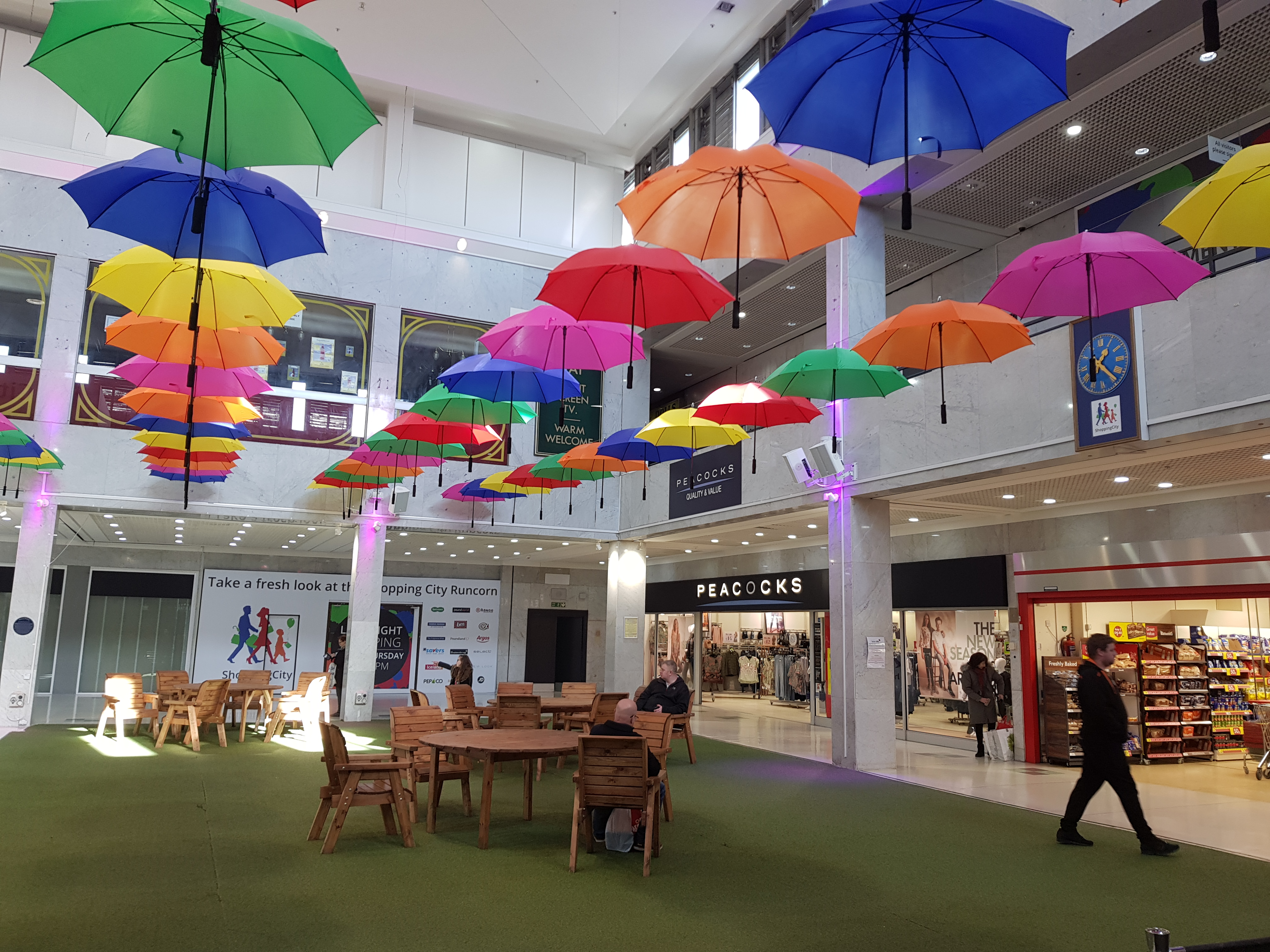
Town Square in Runcorn Shopping City

There has been a shift in employment from manufacturing to service industries. In 1991, 34% worked in the manufacturing sector and 61% were in the service sector. By 2004, 17% were in manufacturing jobs and 78% were in service jobs. This trend in the local region is demonstrated in this chart which shows the regional "gross value added" of Halton and Warrington at current basic prices, with figures in millions of pounds.

Year	Regional Gross Value Added^{d}	Agriculture^{a}	Industry^{b}	Services^{c}
1995	3,636	14	1,361	2,261
2000	4,768	10	1,433	3,324
2003	5,774	18	1,399	4,356

1. includes hunting and forestry
2. includes energy and construction
3. includes financial intermediation services indirectly measured
4. Components may not sum to totals due to rounding

Runcorn has two shopping centres. The original shopping area was in the older part of the town on High Street, Regent Street and Church Street. This centre continues to exist, but with the coming of the new town, has declined. In the centre of the new town, Runcorn Shopping City is an enclosed shopping mall with two attached bus stations. Adjacent to it is Trident Retail Park, containing shopping outlets and formerly contained a cinema and nearby is a large Asda superstore that opened in 1989.

== Transport ==
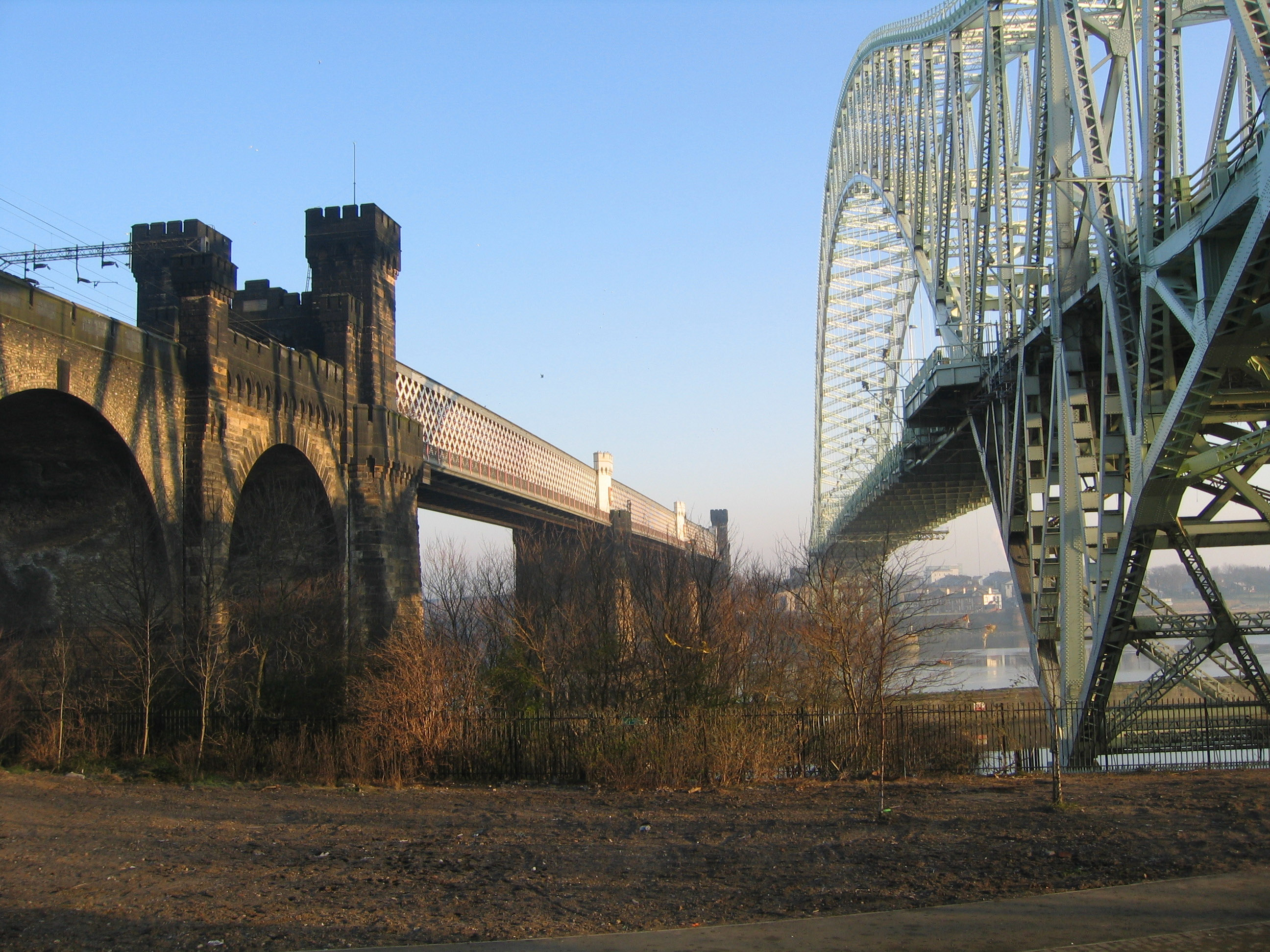
Runcorn Railway Bridge (left) and the Silver Jubilee Bridge (right)

The Runcorn New Town Masterplan created three distinct types of road: busways, expressways and local roads. In addition, there is a network of dedicated cycleways in the town.

The Runcorn Busway was the world's first bus rapid transit system. First conceived in the Runcorn New Town Masterplan in 1966, it opened for services in 1971 and all 22 km (14 mi) were operational by 1980. It is a road network for use by buses only and, unlike guided busways or bus lanes, it is a totally separate road system, not running alongside (or down the middle of) existing roads. It was designed so that most residents would be no more than five minutes' walking distance, or 500 yards (460 m), from a bus stop. The central station is at Runcorn Shopping City, where buses arrive on dedicated raised busways to two enclosed stations. Professor Arthur Ling, Runcorn Development Corporation's Master Planner, claimed to have invented the concept while sketching on the back of an envelope. As of 2025, bus services are provided by Arriva North West, Anthony's Travel, Howards Travel, Ashcroft Travel, Halton Community Transport and Warringtons Own Buses. Two coach companies operate from the town; Selwyns Travel and Anthony's Travel.

The expressways form a ring road around the town in a figure of eight and are intended to keep all through traffic off the local roads. This system links north to Widnes and Liverpool by the A533 over the Mersey Gateway bridge, east to Warrington by the A56, south to Northwich and north Cheshire by the A533, and west by the A557 to the M56 and to Frodsham. The M56 links to the M6 and, to the north of Widnes, the A557 links to the M62.

There are two railway stations. Runcorn, in the old town, is on the Liverpool branch of the West Coast Main Line and managed by Avanti West Coast, which provides services between Liverpool Lime Street and London Euston. West Midlands Trains run a service between Liverpool and Birmingham New Street that calls at the station. Runcorn East station, in the new town's Murdishaw district, is managed by Transport for Wales, and provides services to Warrington, Manchester, Chester and North Wales.

Runcorn is 8 mi (13 km) from Liverpool John Lennon Airport and 22 mi (35 km) from Manchester Airport.

== Landmarks ==
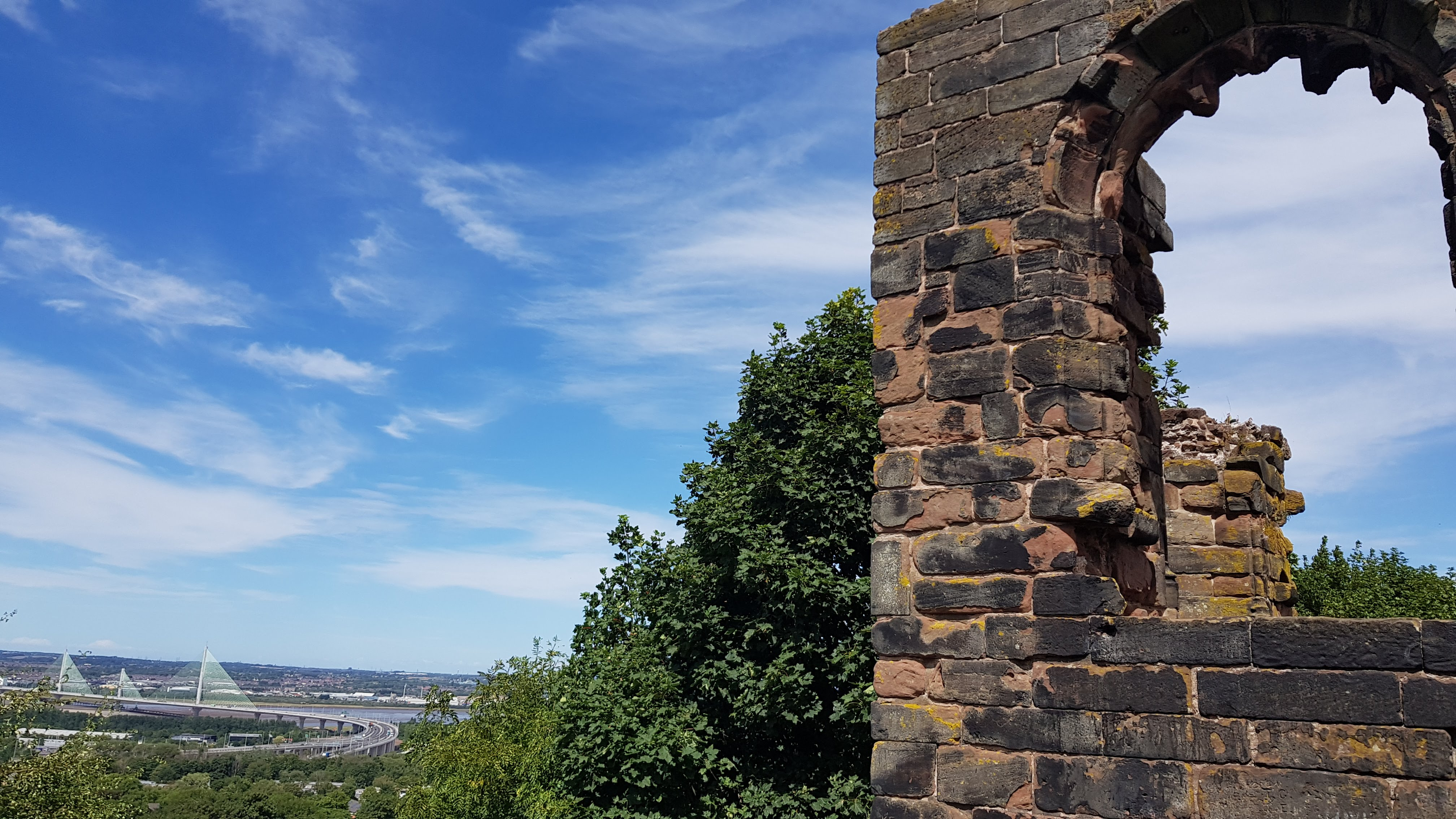
Halton Castle overlooking the Mersey Gateway Bridge

There are two Grade I listed buildings and scheduled monuments in Runcorn: Halton Castle and Norton Priory. Halton Castle is one of two remaining Norman castles in Cheshire, built in 1071 and reconstructed in local sandstone in the 13th century. The castle was slighted following the Civil War and the gatehouse converted to a courthouse in 1737, now The Castle public house and a Grade II* listed building in its own right. Norton Priory, now a museum, is the most excavated monastic site in Europe, consisting of the ruins of an Abbey, 12th century undercroft and 18th century Walled Garden. Norton Priory and Halton Castle are managed by Norton Priory Museum Trust Limited.

Most Grade II* listed buildings in the town are around the base of Halton Castle, including Seneschal's House (1598), Halton Old Hall (1693), Chesshyre Library (1730) and Halton Vicarage (1739). Hallwood (1710), a former mansion house, is also Grade II* listed and its former stable block is Grade II. But both have been derelict since the Tricorn public house closed in 2017. The town's 19th century Anglican churches are also listed buildings, including the Grade II* All Saints (1849) and St John's (1897), and the Grade II Holy Trinity (1838), Christ Church (1841) and St Mary's (1851).

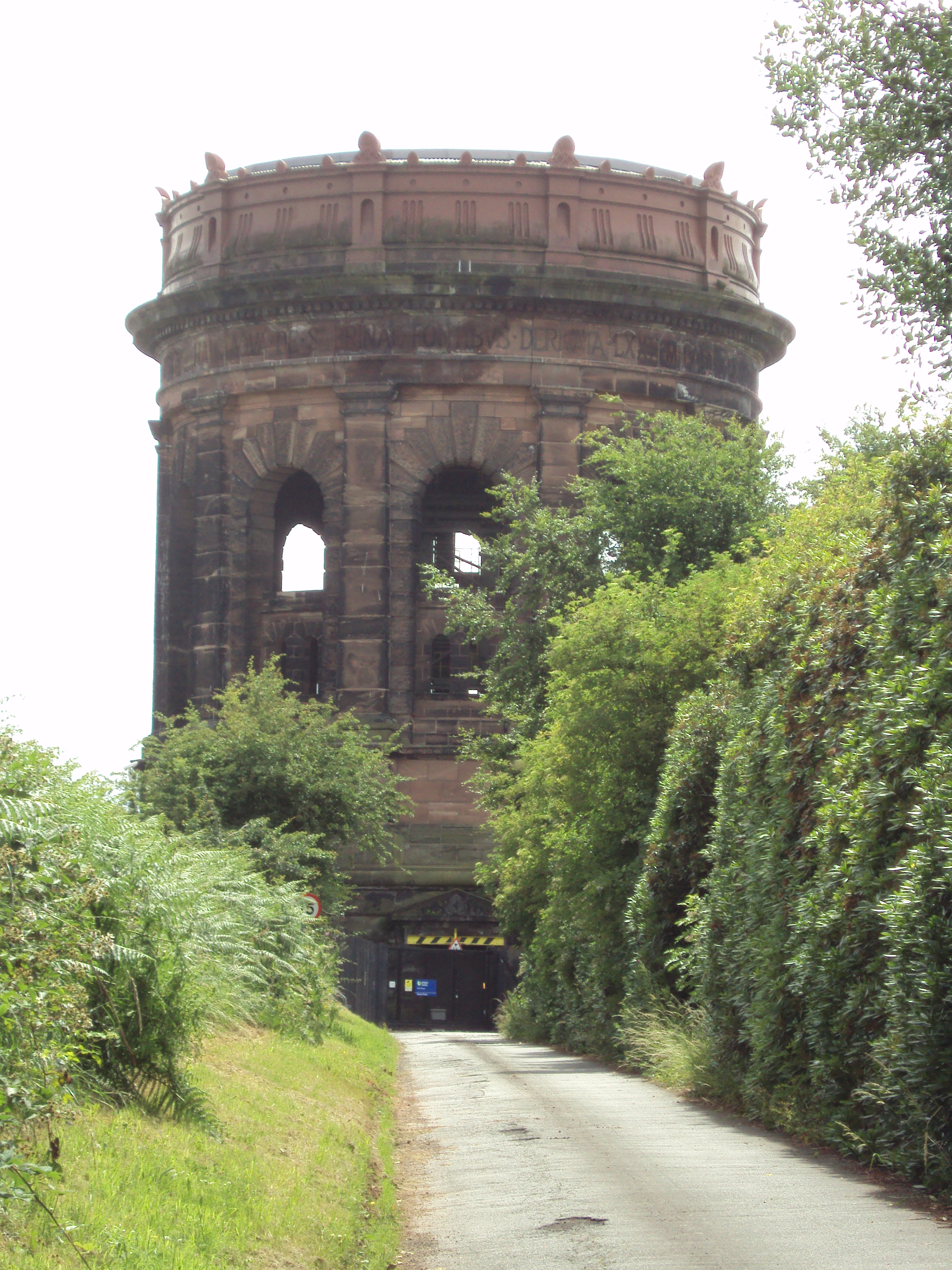
Norton Water Tower

The Runcorn home of the Duke of Bridgewater, Bridgewater House, is a prominent landmark and Grade II listed building on the banks of the Manchester Ship Canal where a flight of locks from his canal once stood. The home of a later industrialist, Thomas Johnson, became Runcorn Town Hall, a Grade II listed Italianate building with similarities to Osborne House on the Isle of Wight.

The landmarks largest in scale are the three bridges which span the River Mersey and the Manchester Ship Canal at Runcorn. Runcorn Railway Bridge and the Silver Jubilee Bridge are Grade II* and II listed buildings respectively while the Mersey Gateway Bridge was officially opened in 2018 by Queen Elizabeth II and the Duchess of Sussex. Norton Water Tower is another prominent Grade II listed landmark at 112 ft (34 m) high.

Runcorn War Memorial is Grade II listed and commemorates those who died in the First and Second World Wars, as well as those killed in later conflicts. The garden contains a statue of Thomas Alfred Jones who was awarded the Victoria Cross in the First World War. There is a memorial in Halton Village commemorating residents who served in the Boer War.

Runcorn Shopping City, at the heart of the New Town, was designed by Fred Roche CBE and at the time of its construction was the largest covered shopping centre in Europe. It was opened by Queen Elizabeth II in 1972.

== Culture ==
=== Theatre and cinema ===
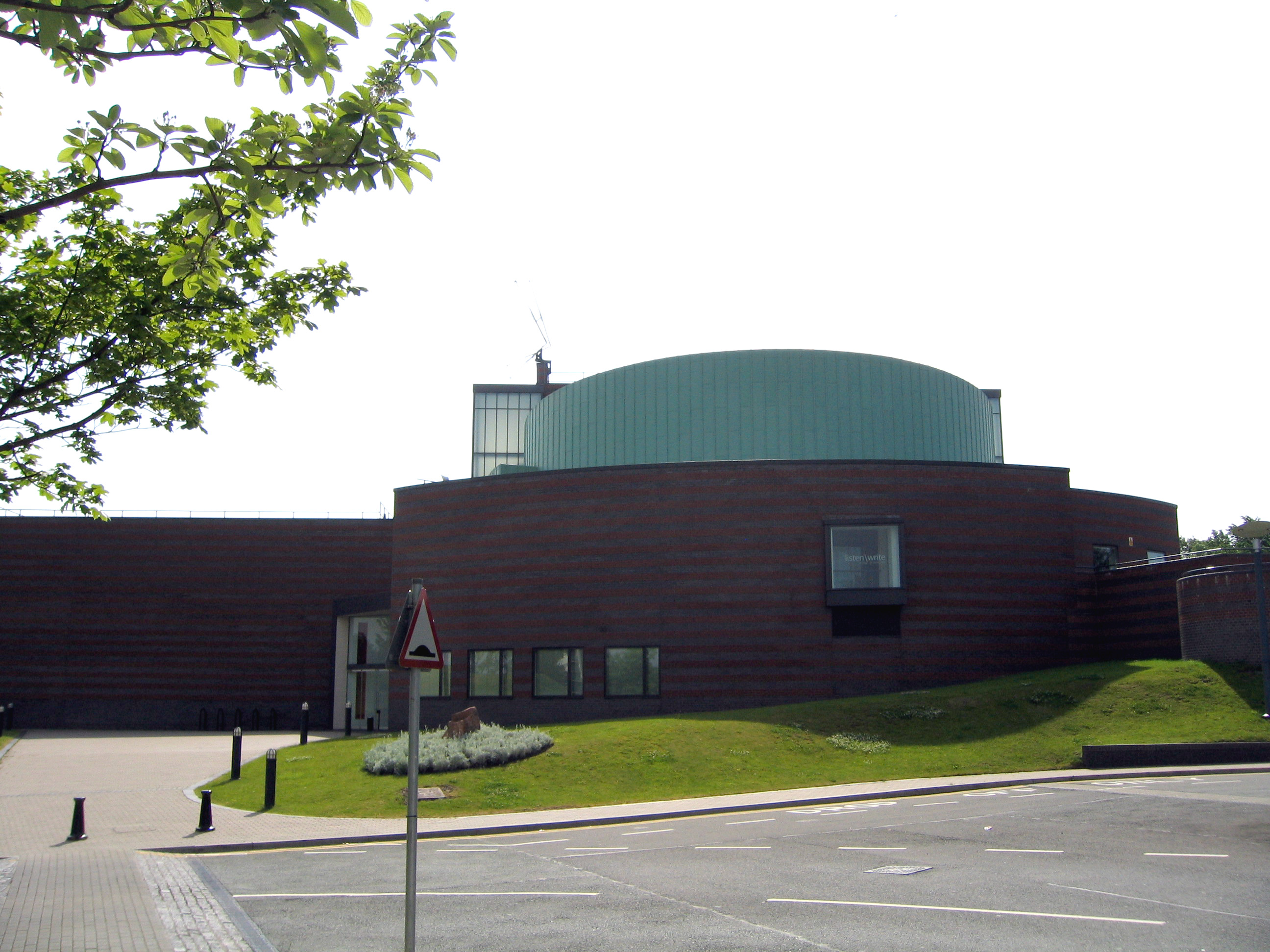
The Brindley Theatre in 2006

The Brindley is a theatre and arts centre which opened in 2004. It is in the old town and named after James Brindley, engineer of the adjacent Bridgewater Canal. It contains a proscenium theatre seating 420 and a multi-purpose theatre seating 108, The Studio, which doubles as a cinema. There is an exhibition space for art installations, a small café and multi-purpose rooms. The centre is owned and administered by Halton Borough Council, which runs community events in the building. In 2007, it won 'Best Arts Project in the UK' at the National Lottery Awards. A multiplex cinema was run by Cineworld at Trident Retail Park until its closure in 2023.

=== Media ===
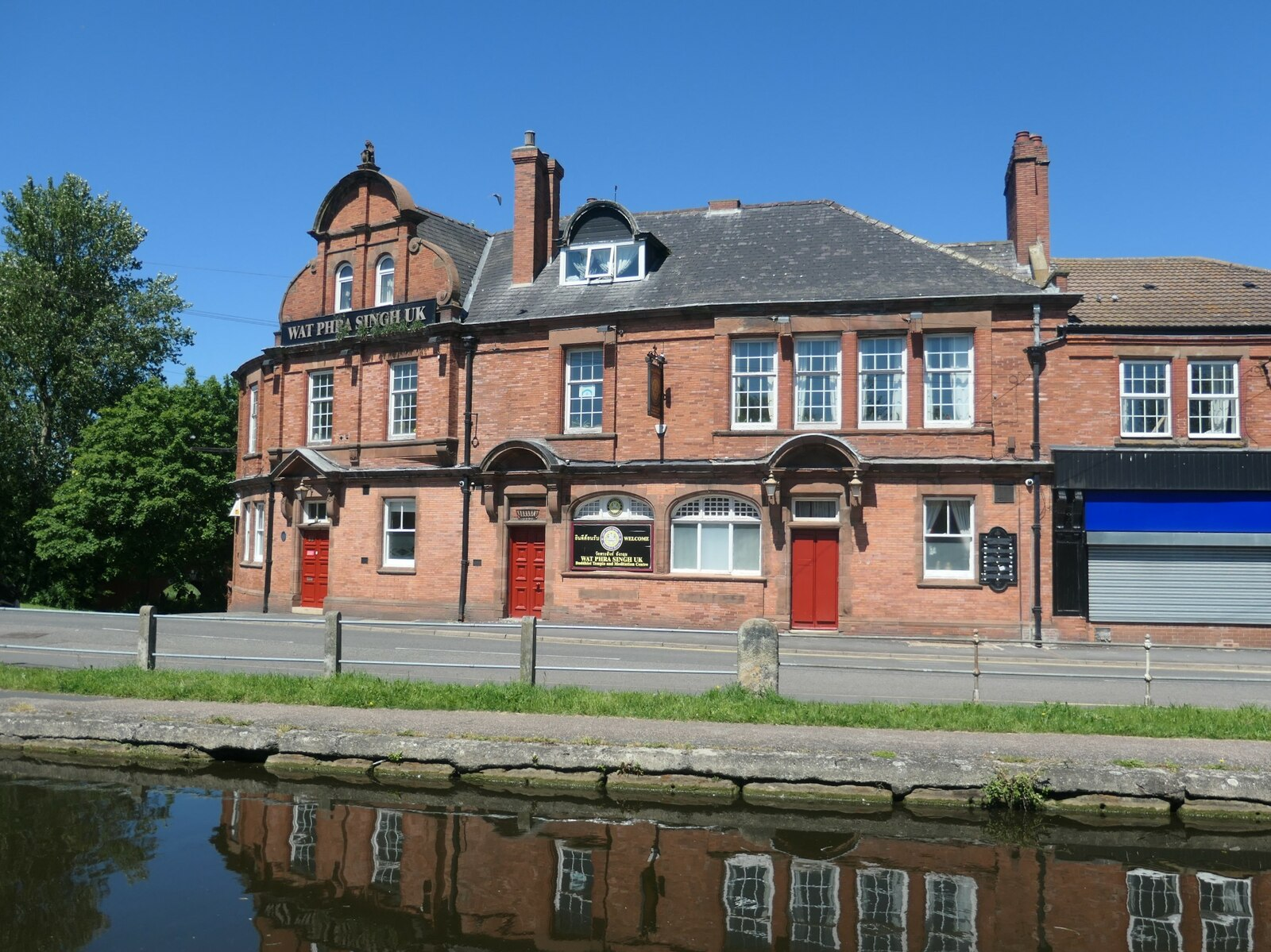
The former Waterloo Hotel, setting of The Archer in Two Pints of Lager and a Packet of Crisps and now a Buddhist temple.

Runcorn is served by two weekly newspapers: the Runcorn & Widnes Weekly News, published by Trinity Mirror North West & North Wales and hosted online by the Liverpool Echo, and the Runcorn and Widnes World, published by Newsquest. The town is also home to Halton Community Radio, a volunteer-run radio station that broadcasts over the Runcorn and Widnes area. It launched in 2008 with a five-year licence to broadcast. The station has stopped broadcasting as of 2025.

The BBC situation comedy Two Pints of Lager and a Packet of Crisps was set in Runcorn and included external shots of the former Waterloo Hotel (known in the programme as The Archer), the Silver Jubilee Bridge and Halton Castle. Drop Dead Gorgeous, a drama on BBC Three, was also set in Runcorn. The first two series of the BBC police drama Merseybeat featured sequences of the town and areas of Runcorn old town featured in The Five TV crime drama series on Sky1. Norton Priory has been used as a location in historical dramas, sitcoms and children's programmes, including Little Birds, Bone Detectives (Channel 4), Island at War, Casanova and Young Dracula. The Silver Jubilee Bridge featured in the Netflix series Stay Close. Runcorn was a setting in the Netflix series The Last Kingdom, but no scenes were filmed in the town.

=== Literature ===
The Runcorn Ferry is a monologue by Marriott Edgar and popularised by Stanley Holloway celebrating the ancient river crossing which existed from the 12th century until the construction of the Transporter Bridge in 1905. It includes the lines:

Per tuppence per person per trip ... Per trip or per part of per trip.

== Community facilities ==
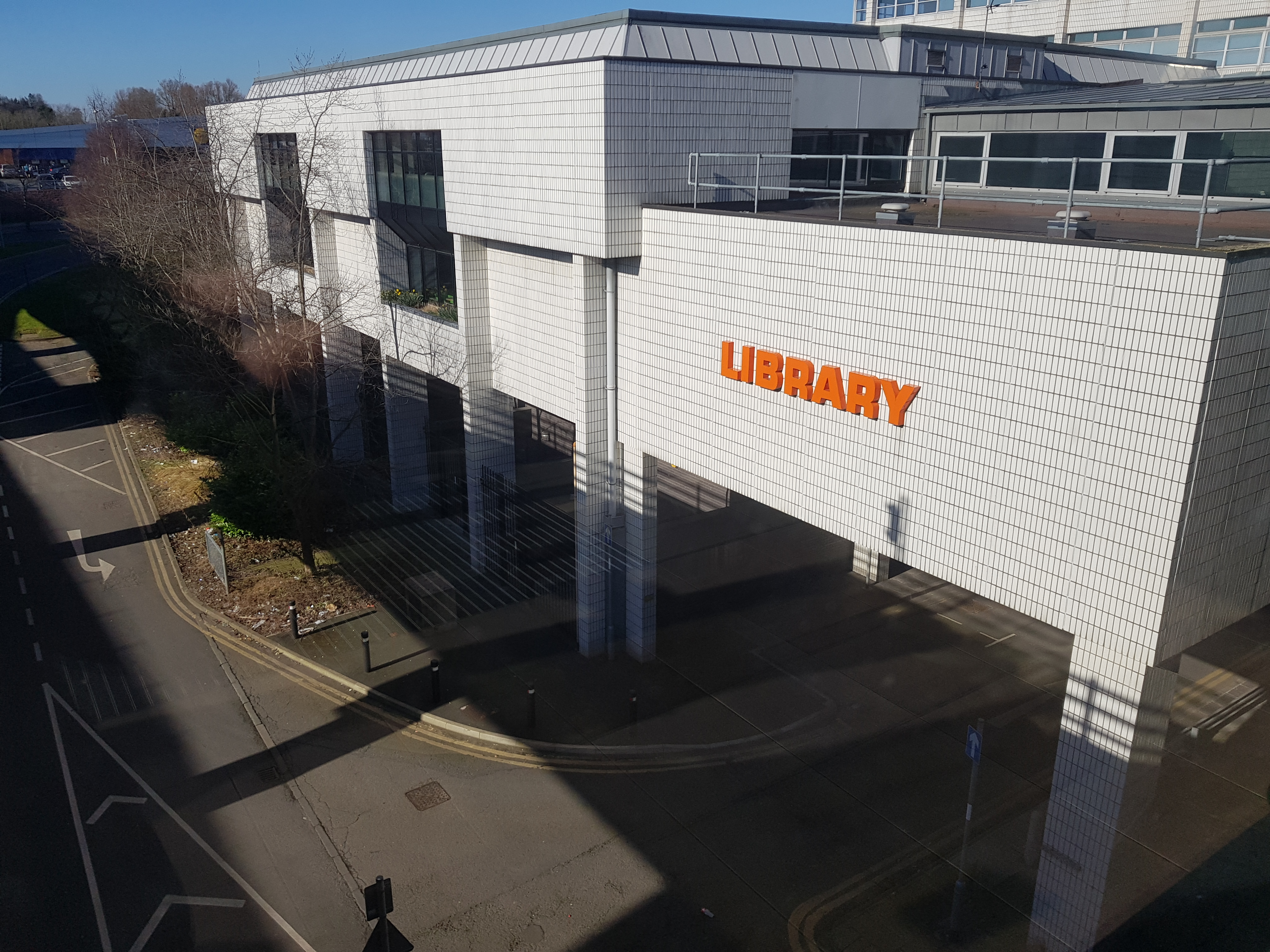
Halton Lea Library

The main library is at Runcorn Shopping City with a branch library in the old town centre. A Council 'one stop shop' called Halton Direct Link is based next to the main library.

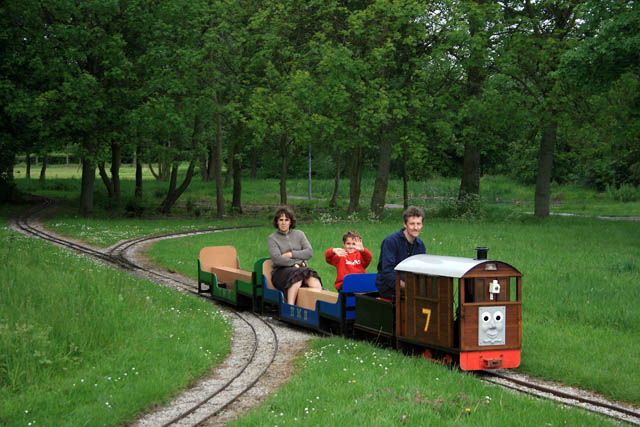
Halton Miniature Railway

Open areas in Runcorn form part of Mersey Forest, one of Britain's community forests. In addition to smaller local parks and allotments, there are four large parks in Runcorn:

- Town Park forms the centre of the eastern part of the New Town. It is accessible from all of the surrounding communities and links them to Shopping City. There is a privately operated dry ski slope in the park in addition to a volunteer-run 7 1/4" gauge miniature railway, first opened in 1979, which runs through the park for almost a mile.
- Phoenix Park adjoins Town Park to the north and includes a cafe, rock climbing wall, skate park and BMX track. There is a pavilion, walking routes along the Bridgewater Canal, woodland walks, a lake, picnic benches and a children's playground. Footpaths lead to Norton Priory.
- Runcorn Hill Park and Local Nature Reserve is in the centre of the western part of the town, partly on a dis-used nineteenth-century quarry. It holds a Green Flag Award and incorporates natural woodland and heathland with more formal landscaping, playing fields, a bandstand, model boating lake, sporting facilities and cafe. A Chirotherium dinosaur footprint discovered in the quarry can be viewed in the cafe.
- Wigg Island is a large park and nature reserve to the north on the banks of the Mersey and Manchester Ship Canal. The community park was opened on 19 April 2002 by the Mayor of Halton and Bill Oddie. The island is named after Charles Wigg. It covers 23 hectares of a former industrial site and includes several bird watching hides. It is reached via The Old Quay Bridge, a Grade II listed swing bridge built in 1894.

There are three privately run swimming pools at Beechwood Community Centre, INARA club and Holiday Inn Runcorn. The local authority runs two leisure centres and swimming pools at Brookvale Recreation Centre in Runcorn and Halton Leisure Centre in Widnes in addition to outdoor sporting facilities in its parks.

Runcorn's hospital is Halton General Hospital, which is administered by the Warrington and Halton Teaching Hospitals NHS Foundation Trust. It has an Urgent Care Centre but acute medical services are provided by Warrington Hospital. The Cheshire and Merseyside Treatment Centre, a purpose-built hospital for orthopaedic surgery, is on the same site. Halton Haven Hospice is in the Murdishaw area of the town. The body responsible for planning health services in Runcorn, including primary care, is the Halton Clinical Commissioning Group.

Cheshire Constabulary operate a police station adjacent to Runcorn Shopping City in the centre of the New Town and Cheshire Fire and Rescue Service maintains a 24-hour fire station.

== Sports ==
=== Football ===
The town has two senior football teams, Runcorn Linnets FC and Runcorn Town FC. It also has a Sunday League and a Junior League, and an Open Age Women's Team, Runcorn Ladies FC.

Runcorn Ladies FC were established in 2012, and played in the Liverpool Open Age Women's Division, finishing in an impressive 7th position in their very first season. The chairman and coaching team decided to agree a merge with Runcorn Linnets, two years later, and thus Runcorn Linnets Ladies were formed.

Runcorn Linnets were formed as a trust-based team in 2006 from the now defunct Runcorn F.C. Halton. It has existed in various guises since 1918, and its performance peaked in 1982 when it won the Alliance Premier League, then the highest division below the Football League.

Runcorn Town was formed in 1970 as Mond Rangers FC with the club changing their name in 2005 in order to "try and bring a more professional look to the club in general, and increase support from both businesses and individuals in the local community." After finishing in third place in the West Cheshire League at the end of the 2009/10 season, the club were elected to join the North West Counties League at their AGM, the highest level that they have ever played at.

=== Rugby ===
In the late 19th century, before the 1895 schism, rugby union was played at the now defunct Runcorn RFC. When the rugby football schism occurred in 1895, Runcorn became founder members of the Northern Rugby Football Union (now Rugby Football League). Runcorn finished bottom of the league in the 1914–15 season and did not recommence playing in the aftermath of the First World War.

Rugby league in the town is now represented by Runcorn Highfield ARLFC.

=== Other sports ===
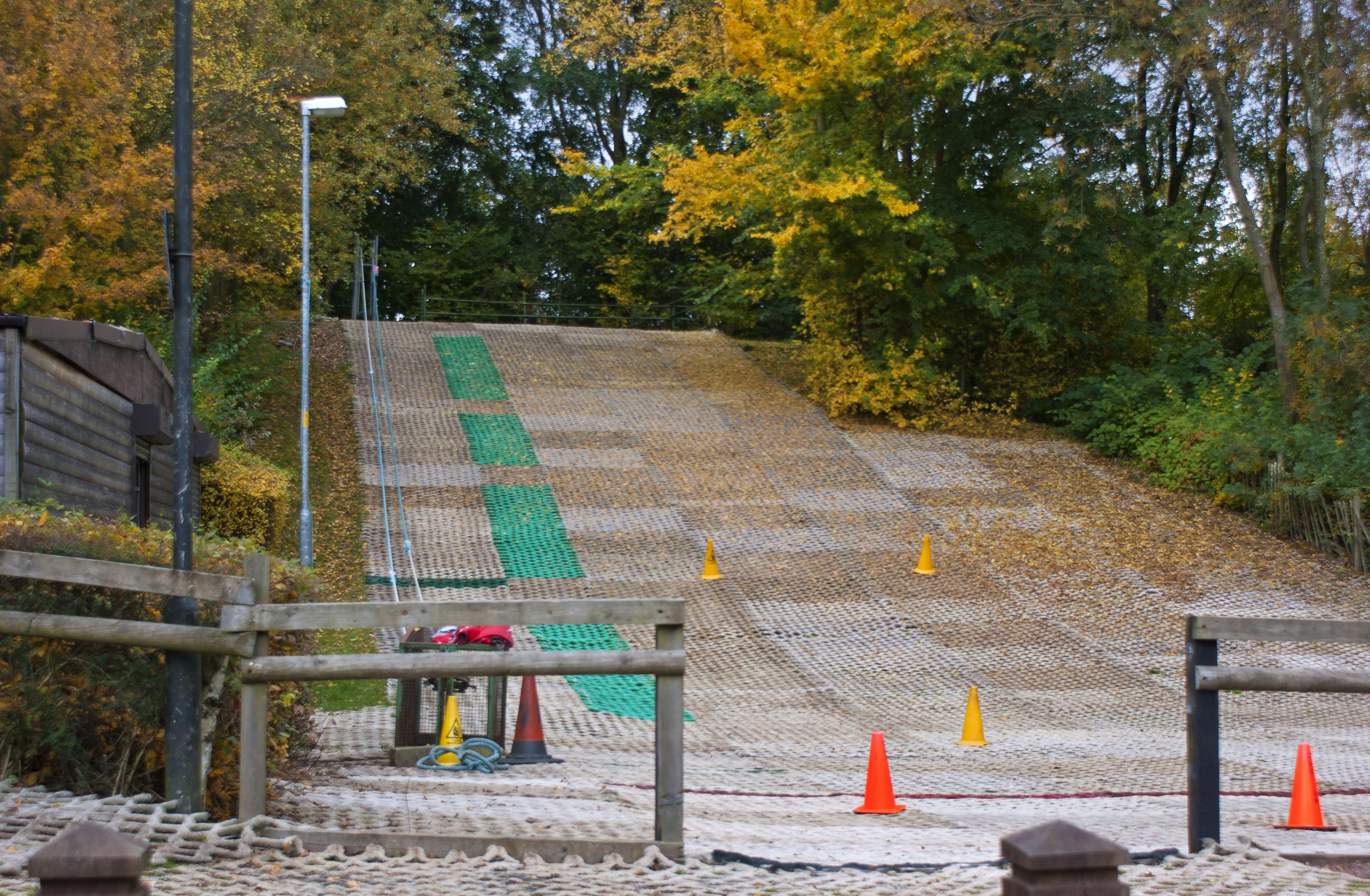
The nursery slope at Runcorn Ski Centre

Runcorn Sports Club in Higher Runcorn hosts several clubs, including Runcorn Cricket Club, Hockey Club, Running Club and Subscription Bowling Club.

Runcorn Rowing Club is sited on the River Weaver Navigation near Clifton Village and also houses Runcorn Canoe Club.

Weston Angling Club Runcorn is a private fishing club that owns Sandymoor Pool in the east of the town.

There is an 18-hole golf course at Runcorn Golf Club in Clifton Road. Nearby is Heath Tennis Club, which uses facilities at the Heath School.

Runcorn Ski Centre in Town Park consists of three dry ski slopes: an 85-metre main slope, a 45-metre extended nursery slope, and a 25-metre nursery slope. The centre runs both skiing and snowboarding lessons.

Runcorn had a professional wrestling school and promotion called the Runcorn Wrestling Academy (RWA) from 2005 until 2020, when it closed following allegations of sexual harassment during the Speaking Out movement.

== Notable people ==
=== Public service ===
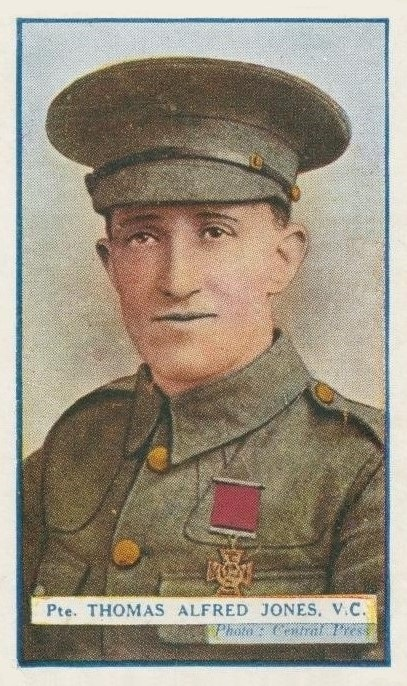
Thomas Alfred Jones VC, 1917

- The Barony of Halton (1071–1413) was a succession of 15 barons whose seat was Halton Castle
- Richard Brooke (died 1569), soldier, bought the manor of Norton from Henry VIII in 1545
- John Savage, 2nd Earl Rivers (c. 1603–1654), politician and royalist
- Sir Henry Brooke, 1st Baronet (1611–1664), soldier and politician
- Sir John Chesshyre (1662–1738), lawyer, the king's first Serjeant-at-law
- Thomas Alcock (1709–1798), Vicar of Runcorn, writer, cider maker.
- Thomas Hazlehurst (1816–1876), Methodist who paid for the local construction of 12 chapels and 3 schools
- Sir John Rigby (1834–1903), judge, politician, and MP for Wisbech
- Thomas Alfred Jones (1880–1956), awarded the Victoria Cross and Distinguished Conduct Medal during WWI

=== Arts and entertainment ===
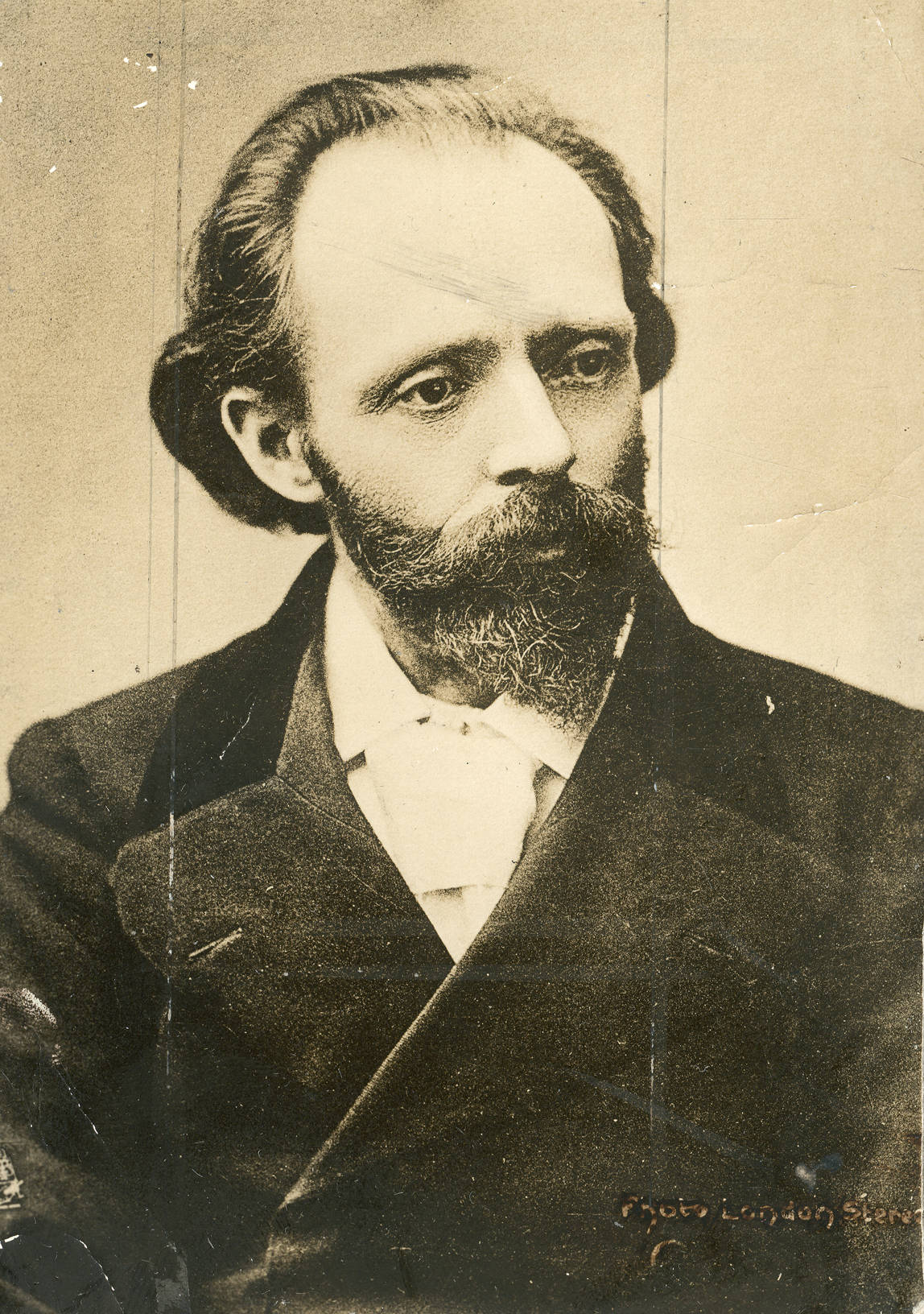
Hall Caine, 1922

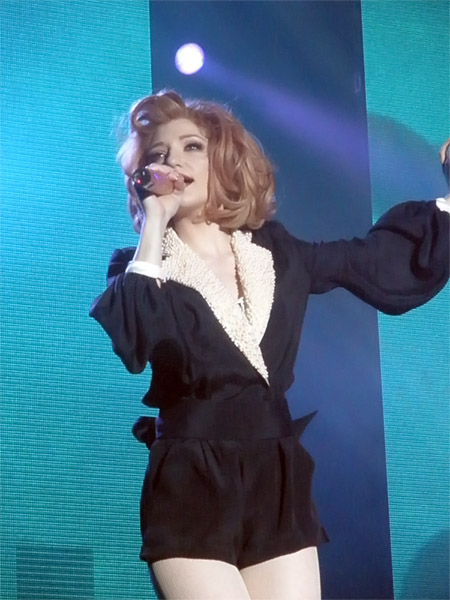
Nicola Roberts, 2009

- Elizabeth Jocelin (1595–1622), writer, wrote The Mother's Legacie to her Unborne Childe.
- Francis William Bourdillon (1852–1921), poet, translator, bibliophile and scholar
- Sir Hall Caine (1853–1931), novelist, dramatist, short story writer, poet and critic. World War I allied propagandist.
- Alistair Taylor (1935–2004) assistant to Brian Epstein and General Manager of Apple Corps
- Anna Keaveney (1949–2004), actress, played Marie Jackson in Brookside (TV series)
- Martin Roscoe (born 1952), classical pianist
- Phil Collins (born 1970), artist, known for video art, often featuring teenagers
- Pete Edmunds (born c. 1972), actor, voice actor, photographer, and artist
- Melanie C (born 1974), singer.
- Kym Marsh (born 1976), singer, TV presenter and actress
- Raymond Waring (born 1977), actor, grew up locally
- Susan Nickson (born 1982), TV writer, screenwriter and executive producer.
- Lee Scott (born 1985), rapper, author, producer and co-founder of record label Blah Records.
- Nicola Roberts (born 1985), singer and member of girl band Girls Aloud, grew up locally
- John Bishop (born 1966), actor and comedian.

=== Business, industry and science ===
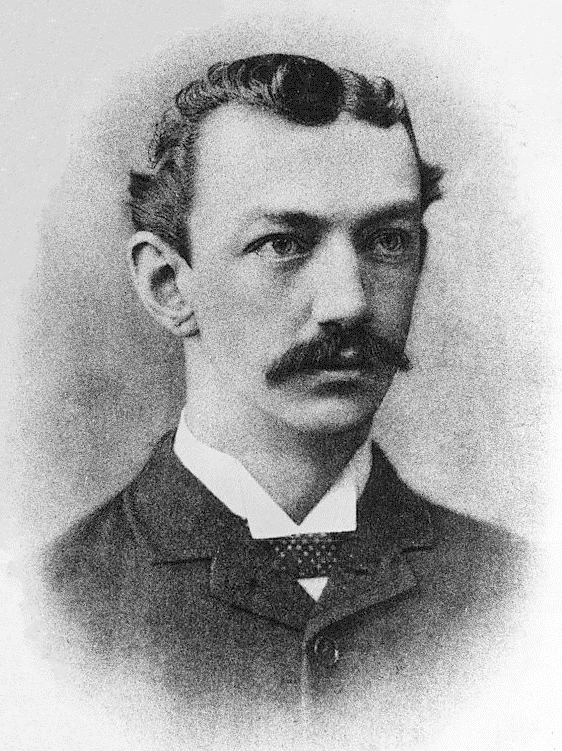
Hamilton Castner, 1890s

- Nathan Alcock (1707–1779), physician
- Thomas Hazlehurst (1779–1842), founder of soap and alkali manufacturer Hazlehurst & Sons
- Charles Wigg (1824–1899), manufacturer of chemicals at Wigg Works, which later became Wigg Island
- William Allen Whitworth (1840–1905), mathematician and priest in the Church of England
- Hamilton Castner (1858–1899), American industrial chemist, formed the Castner-Kellner Alkali Company in Runcorn, which operates the Castner–Kellner process
- Sir William Edward Dudley (1868–1938), president of the Co-operative Wholesale Society
- Sir William Coates (1882–1963), businessman, worked principally for Imperial Chemical Industries (ICI).
- Wilson Baker (1900–2002), organic chemist and academic
- John Riley Holt (1918–2009), Professor at Liverpool University, helped develop the atom bomb
- Sir Peter Baxendell (1925–2025), businessman, an oil-man who worked for Shell plc from 1946 to 1985
- Ian Gibbons (1946–2013), biochemist and molecular biology researcher, worked for Theranos

=== Sports ===
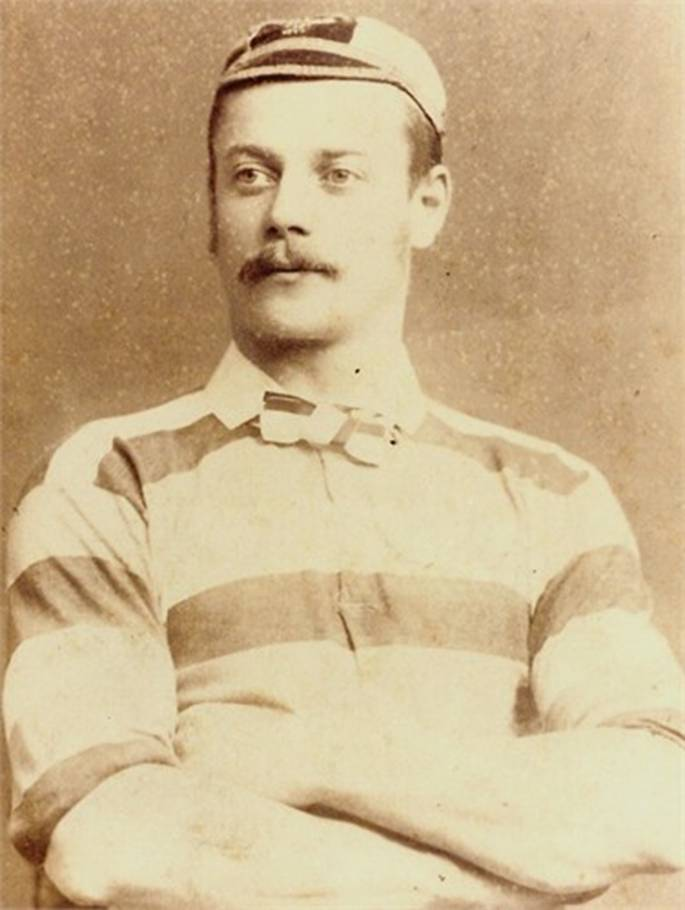
Harry Speakman, 1888

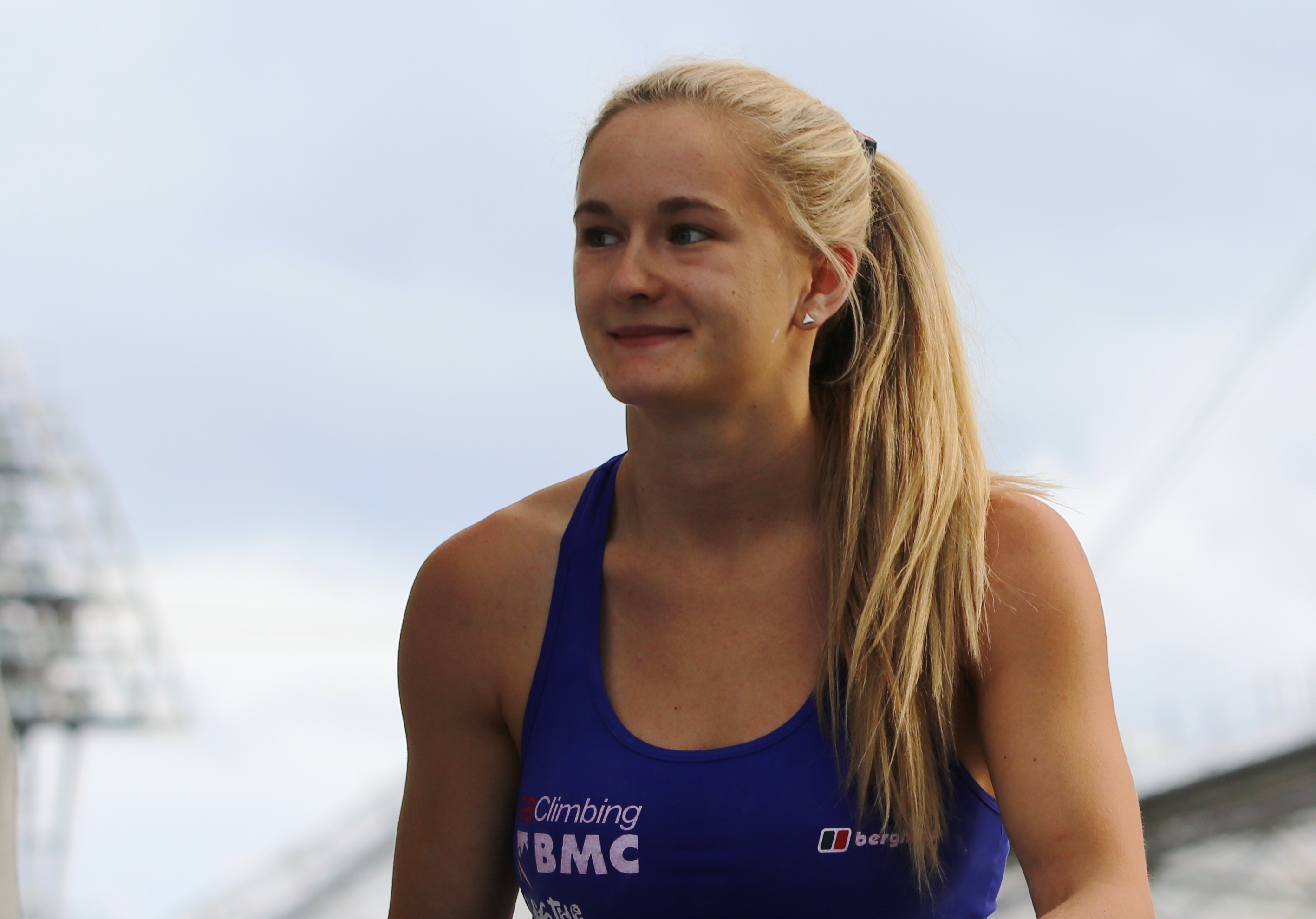
Shauna Coxsey, 2017

- Harry Speakman (1864–1915), rugby player, he toured New Zealand and Australia for the British & Irish Lions
- Jack Fish (1878–1940), rugby league player, played 321 games for Warrington Wolves
- Alf Peacock (1891 – dod unknown), rugby league player, played 485 games including 367 for Warrington Wolves
- Ernie Shaw (1894–1973) rugby league player, played 365 games, including 259 for St Helens R.F.C.
- Robert Done (1904–1982), footballer, played over 200 games, including 147 for Liverpool F.C.
- Bridget Duke-Wooley (1915–1976), alpine skier, competed in the 1948 Winter Olympics
- Ray Dutton (born 1945), rugby league player, played 480 games, including 398 for Widnes Vikings
- Graham Abel (born 1960), footballer, played over 500 games including 296 for Chester City F.C.
- Ian White (born 1970), darts player, competes in Professional Darts Corporation events
- Robin Reid (born 1971), boxer, bronze medallist at the 1992 Summer Olympics
- Kieron Durkan (1973–2018), footballer, played 275 games; raised locally
- Mike Jackson (born 1973), footballer, played 554 games including 245 for Preston North End F.C.
- Kenny Lunt (born 1979), footballer, played 619 games including 373 for Crewe Alexandra F.C.
- Lorna Webb (born 1983), professional cyclist
- Scott Brown (born 1985), footballer, played 388 games, including 106 for Accrington Stanley F.C.
- Jimmy McNulty (born 1985), footballer, played 406 games, now manager of Rochdale A.F.C.
- Shauna Coxsey (born 1993), professional rock climber, has won the IFSC Climbing World Cup
- Ted Chapelhow (born 1995), rugby league player, played 143 games
- Luke Littler (born 2007), darts player, competes in Professional Darts Corporation events

== See also ==
- List of listed buildings in Runcorn
- List of schools in Halton
