= Preston Brook railway station =

Former railway station in England

Preston Brook
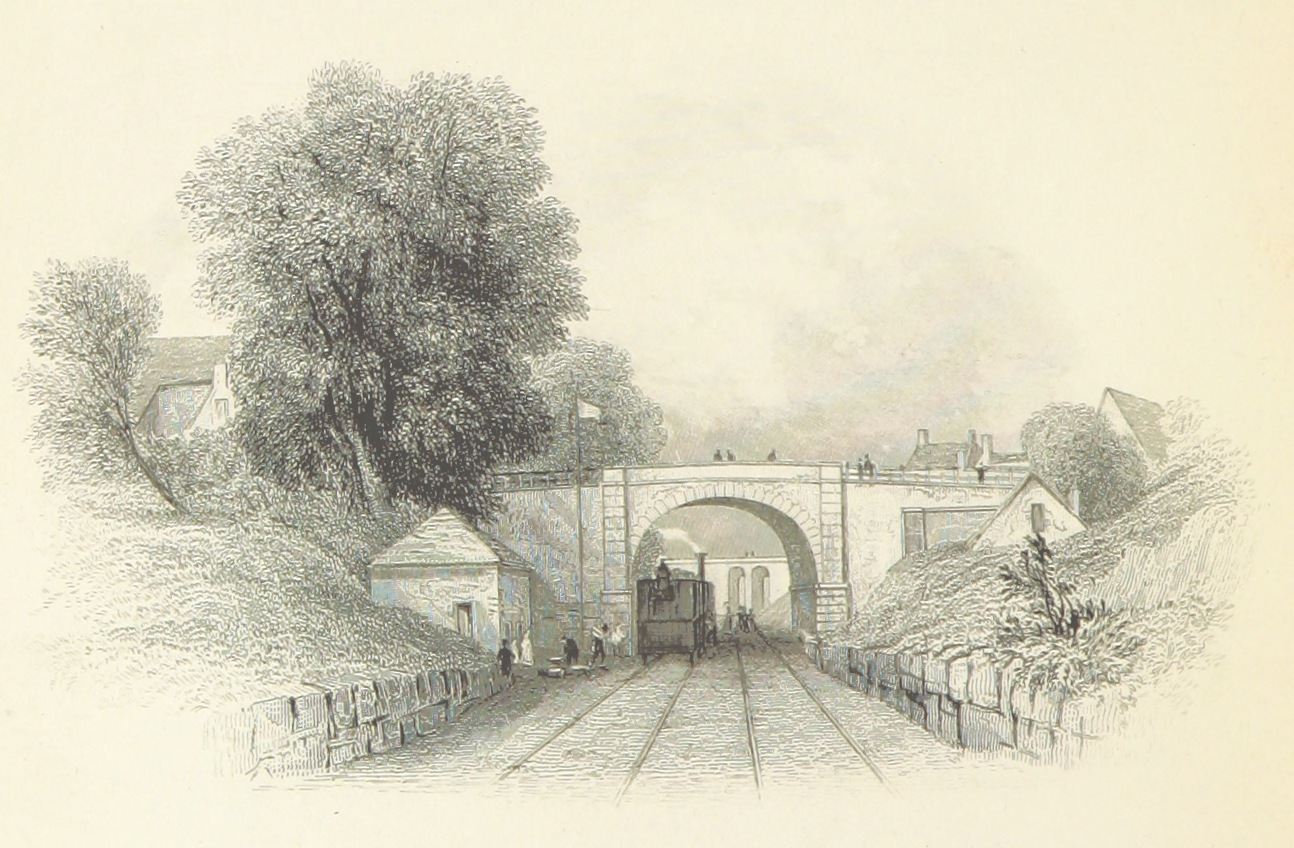
- Preston Brook railway station in 1839

General information
- Location: Halton; England
- Coordinates: 53.3203°N 2.6508°W
- Grid reference: SJ 567 806
- Platforms: 2

Other information
- Status: Disused

History
- Original company: Grand Junction Railway
- Pre-grouping: London and North Western Railway
- Post-grouping: London, Midland and Scottish Railway

Key dates
- 4 July 1837: Opened
- 1 March 1948: Closed to regular passenger services
- April 1952: Closed to rail staff
- 1 September 1958: Closed to goods
Location

Preston Brook railway station was a station on the Grand Junction Railway serving the villages of Preston Brook and Preston on the Hill in what was then Cheshire, England. It opened on 4 July 1837 when the line opened.

The station is located in a cutting on the south side of the Warrington to Chester turnpike (which is now Chester Road, the A56). The road crossed the railway on an over-bridge, with a ramp down to the station building on the down, western, side of the tracks. Initially there were no platforms and a single storey hipped roof building.

By 1898 the station had platforms and the main building on the down platform had been enlarged, this platform was still accessed via a ramp. On the up platform there were some buildings, probably a shelter, and steps down from the road. (Note: Down trains usually headed away from the major conurbation, usually London, some railway companies ran 'up' to their headquarters location, in this case 'up' trains were going to Crewe and 'down' trains to Warrington Bank Quay.)

In the early days there were two mixed trains in each direction, times changed from year to year. (Note: Mixed trains at this time meant a mixture of first and second class carriages and that the train probably stopped at every station, by contrast first class trains has only first class carriages and stopped at only first class stations)

The station closed to passengers and parcels on 1 March 1948 but it continued in use for railway workers until 1963. April 1952

Goods facilities were a little remote from the station being approximately 500 yards (460 m) south of the station, they consisted of a goods shed and several trans-shipment sidings between the mainline and the associated Manchester Ship Canal Company's Bridgewater siding to the east. The goods yard was equipped for general goods and livestock with a 1½ ton crane. The goods yard closed on 1 September 1958.

The line is still open, other than a station house, no substantive remains exist as of 2016.

Preceding station	Historical railways	Following station
Acton Bridge	London and North Western Railway; Grand Junction Railway	Moore
