= All Saints' Church, Daresbury =

Coordinates: 53.3406°N 2.6312°W

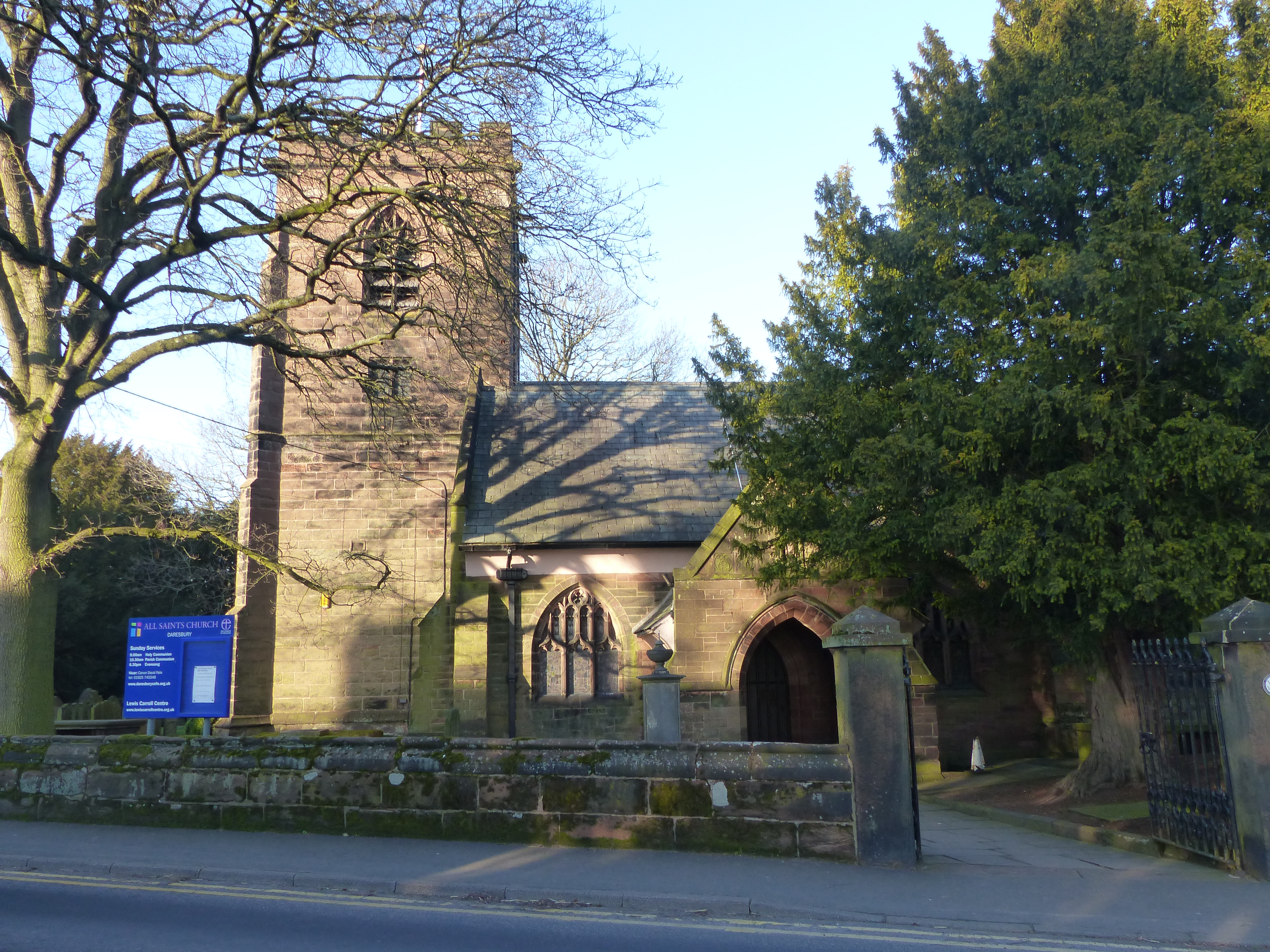
- All Saints' Church from the south

- Location in Cheshire
- OS grid reference: SJ 580,828
- Location: Daresbury, Cheshire
- Country: England
- Denomination: Church of England
- Churchmanship: Liberal Catholic
- Website: www.daresburycofe.org.uk

History
- Status: Parish church

Architecture
- Functional status: Active
- Heritage designation: Grade II*
- Designated: 8 January 1970
- Architect: Paley and Austin
- Architectural type: Church
- Style: Gothic, Gothic Revival
- Completed: 1872; 154 years ago

Specifications
- Materials: Red sandstone, slate roof

Administration
- Province: York
- Diocese: Chester
- Archdeaconry: Chester
- Deanery: Great Budworth
- Parish: All Saints, Daresbury

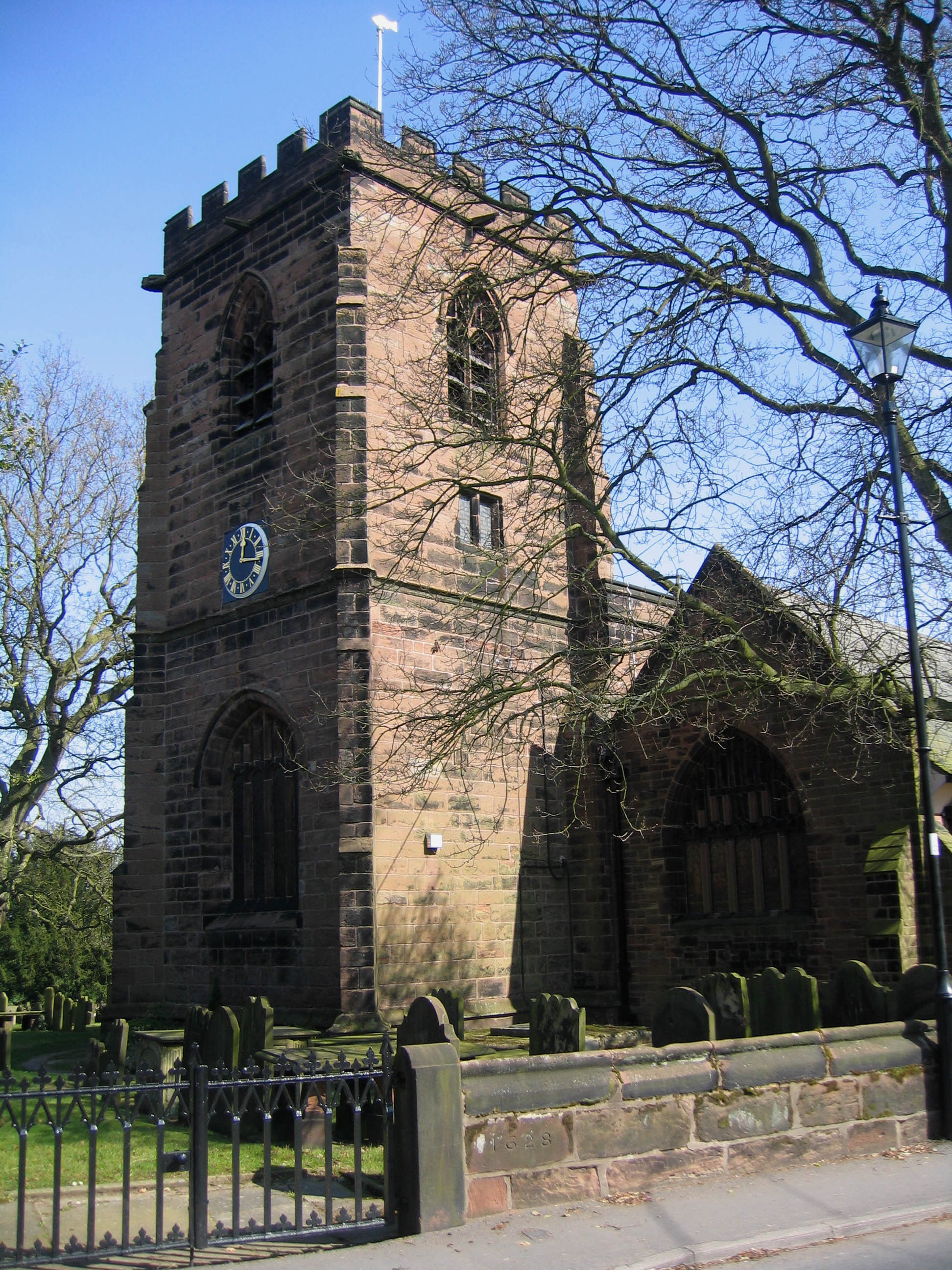
Tower

All Saints' Church is in the village of Daresbury, Cheshire, England. It is known for its association with Lewis Carroll who is commemorated in its stained glass windows depicting characters from Alice's Adventures in Wonderland. It is recorded in the National Heritage List for England as a designated Grade II* listed building. The church is an active Church of England parish church in the diocese of Chester, the archdeaconry of Chester and the deanery of Great Budworth. The author Lewis Carroll was born in All Saints' Vicarage in 1832 when his father, Charles Dodgson, was perpetual curate at the church. This was commemorated in March 2012 when the Lewis Carroll Centre, attached to the church, was opened.

== History ==
In the 12th century a chapelry was founded on the site of the present church as a daughter house of Norton Priory. It was a chapel of ease within the parish of Runcorn. After the Reformation the patronage of the Runcorn parish passed into the hands of Christ Church, Oxford. It is likely that the stone tower was built shortly after this time. Over the years there were frequent disputes between the worshippers at Daresbury and the mother church at Runcorn relating to financial matters.

Other than the tower, the church was largely rebuilt between 1870 and 1872 by the Lancaster architects Paley and Austin. They lengthened the church, extended the clerestory to the east, and added a new north porch and vestry, for £6,000 (equivalent to £590,000 in 2025). During the restoration an old rood loft and screen were destroyed. Richards identified this as of "pure Welsh type" and its loss as "nothing short of a major calamity". Daresbury became a parish separate from Runcorn in February 1880. Families who have been associated with the church over the centuries are those of Greenall, Rylands, Chadwick, Heron, Milner, Houghton, and Okell. The tower was restored in 1872 by Sir Gilbert Greenall.

== Architecture ==
=== Exterior ===
The church is built in red sandstone with a slate roof. The architectural style of the body of the church is Perpendicular. (Note: Brandwood et al note that this is a relatively early example of the use of the Perpendicular style in the Gothic Revival. They also state that it is "faithful to a church of the late 15th century".) The plan of the church consists of a five-bay nave with north and south aisles, a tower at the west at the end of the nave, and entrances opposite each other in the north and south aisles. The tower has corner buttresses and is crenellated. On its top is a weather vane in the shape of a fish. The west window is plain with four lights and the belfry windows are also plain with two lights. The date 1110 is carved on the south side. It is thought that this date was originally 1550 but that the number had weathered and it was mistaken by restorers. At the east end of the south aisle is the Daniell Chapel. The chapel had formerly been called the Chadwick Chapel but its name was changed to the Daniell chapel to commemorate one of Cheshire's ancient families who had connections with Daresbury.

=== Interior ===
Inside the church, the arcades are carried on plain octagonal columns. The pulpit is Jacobean with carvings of heads of angels which Richards considers to be possibly the most elaborate of their kind in the county. It also includes a carving similar to the griffin in Alice's Adventures. The font dates from the 19th century and was the gift of Miss Elizabeth Wood. Its elaborate wooden cover was given by Lady Greenall. There is a Green Man carved in the re-used Jacobean rood screen behind the altar. The oak bench ends are carved with "inventive tracery-work". In the belfry is a board with an acrostic on the name "Daresbury".

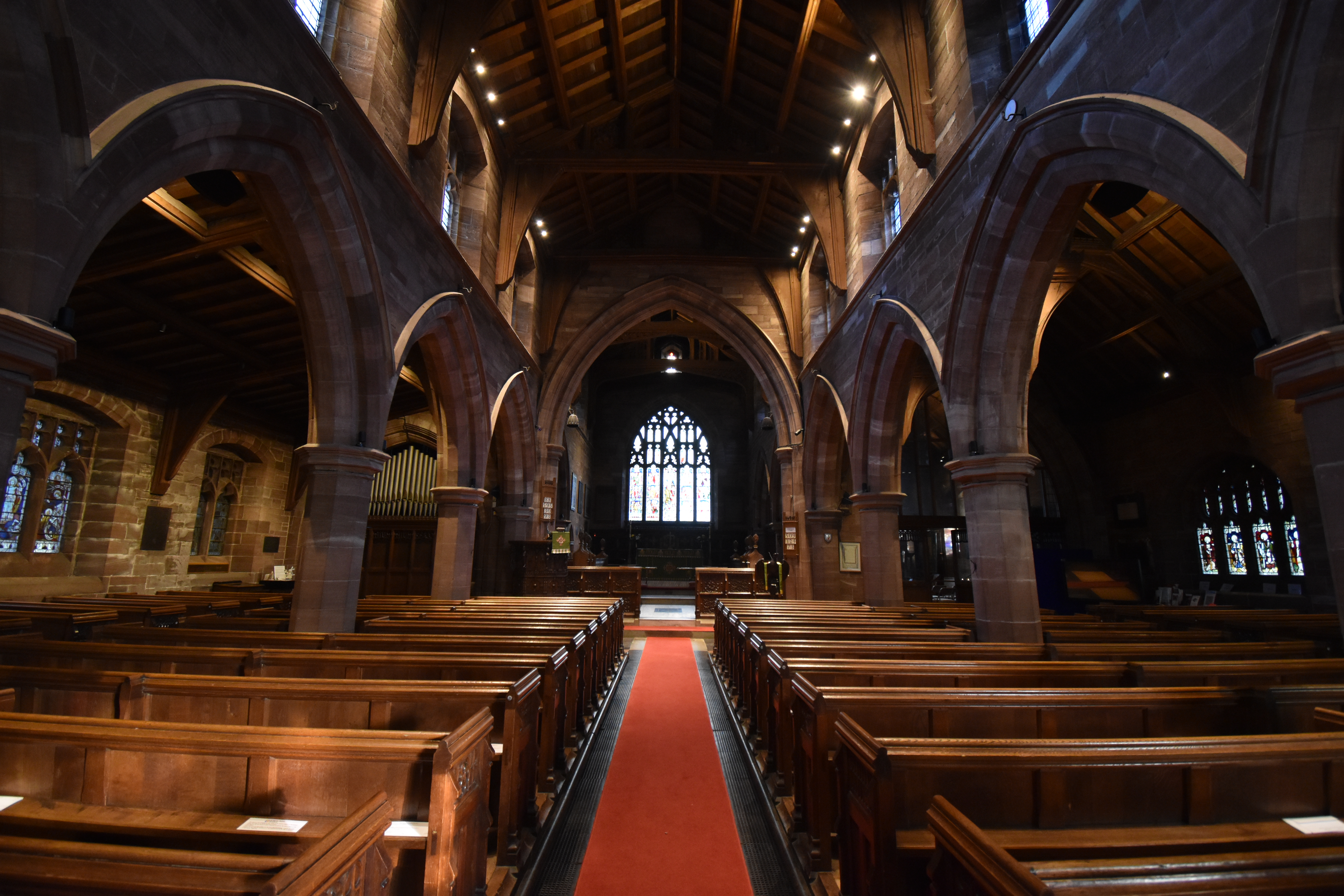
Interior

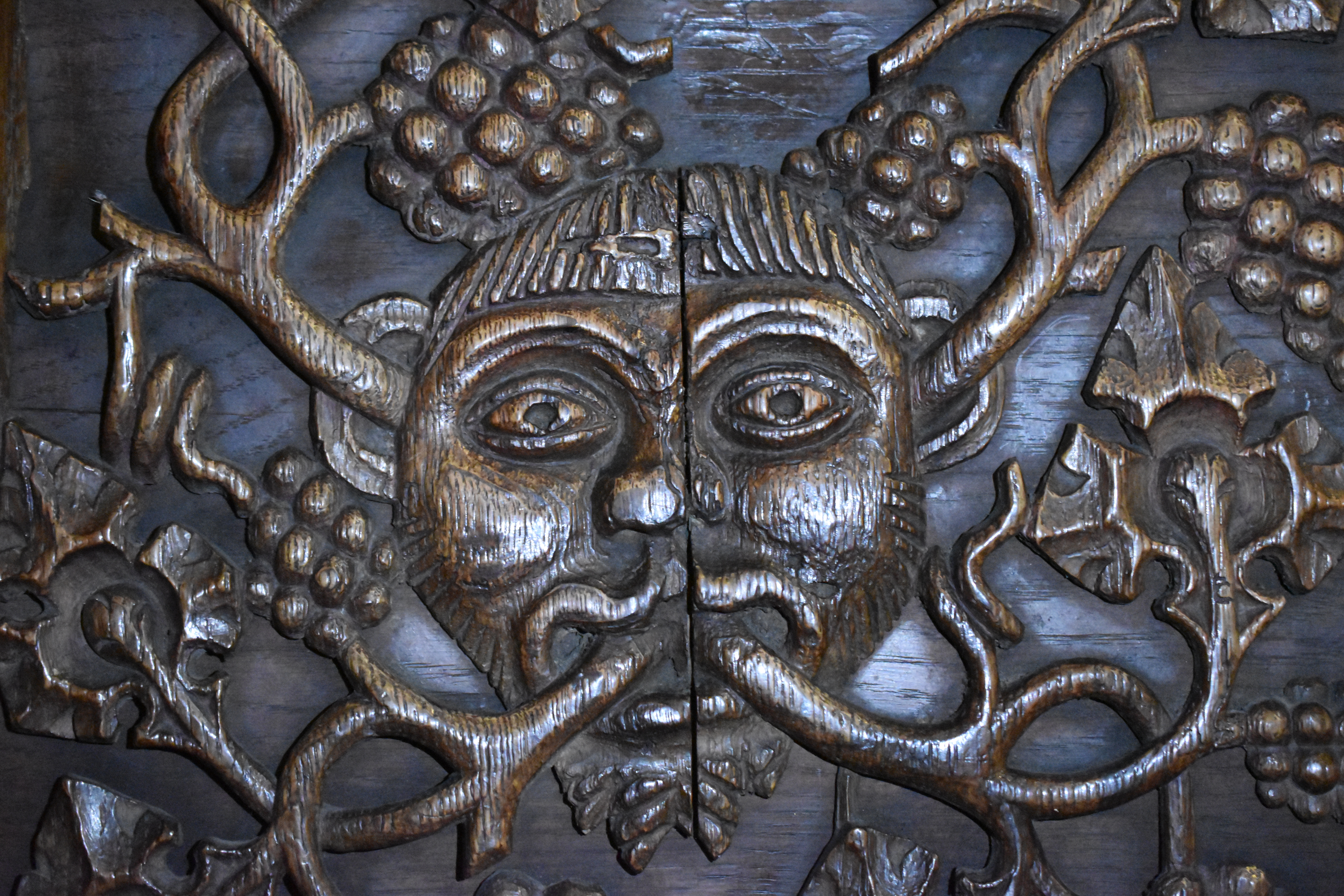
The green man

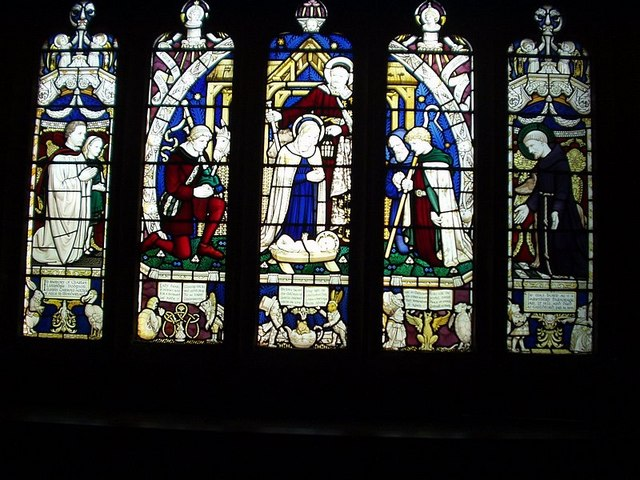
The Nativity window commemorating Lewis Carroll

The stained glass in the windows of the south aisle depicts the eleven apostles without Judas Iscariot. They were donated in the middle of the 19th century by the Stubbs family, industrialists in Warrington. The east window of the Daniell chapel includes characters from Alice's Adventures in Wonderland. The window was erected in 1935, following a memorial fund to celebrate the centenary of Carroll's birth. It was designed by Geoffrey Webb and dedicated on 30 June 1935 by Herbert Gresford Jones, Bishop of Warrington. The upper panels depict a nativity scene surmounted by eight angels, and the leftmost panel shows Lewis Carroll himself accompanied by Alice Liddell. The windows incorporate symbolic panels relating to Carroll's life, including the Cheshire wheatsheaf, the arms of Rugby School and Christ Church, Oxford, and mathematical instruments. Across the base of the window are five panels which include characters from the Alice books together with words from Carroll's poem Christmas Greetings. The characters are based on the illustrations by John Tenniel. On the south wall are windows designed by Trena Cox depicting The Flight into Egypt and The Annunciation which were donated to the church in 1960 in memory of the Broome family of Preston-on-the-Hill.

On the south wall of the church is a memorial by John Gibson which was preserved from the old church. It commemorates Sarah, wife of Henry Byrom of Liverpool, who died in 1833. Elsewhere in the church are memorials to Radulphus Starkie who died in the 17th century, to Rebecca Rutter, who died in 1725, and a memorial by E. Ashworth to Henry Byrom, who died in 1804. In the chancel is a memorial to George Heron, a canon of Chester Cathedral who baptised Lewis Carroll. Also in the chancel are two brasses to members of the Greenall family who died in 1861 and 1867. In the Daniell chapel are memorials to members of the Chadwick family of Daresbury Hall. The two-manual organ was built by Jardine and restored in 2002 by A. J. Carter. There is a ring of eight bells, all of which were cast by John Warner and Sons in 1913. The parish registers date from 1617, and the churchwardens' accounts from 1663.

== External features ==
The churchyard contains a 16th-century font in which, amongst many others, Lewis Carroll was baptised. Also in the churchyard are the war graves of two soldiers and a Royal Navy schoolmaster of World War I.

== Lewis Carroll Centre ==
The centre consists of a semicircular sandstone structure with tall windows attached to the north of the church and approached through the north door. On the walls are descriptive panels giving information about Charles Dodgson, Lewis Carroll, and other members of the family. Hanging in the room is the meeting bell that formerly called canal people to worship in the floating mission church at Preston Brook on the nearby Bridgewater Canal. The centre also serves as a meeting room for schools and other groups. The church and centre are open every day, and there is no admission charge.

== Gallery ==
Panels depicting characters from Alice

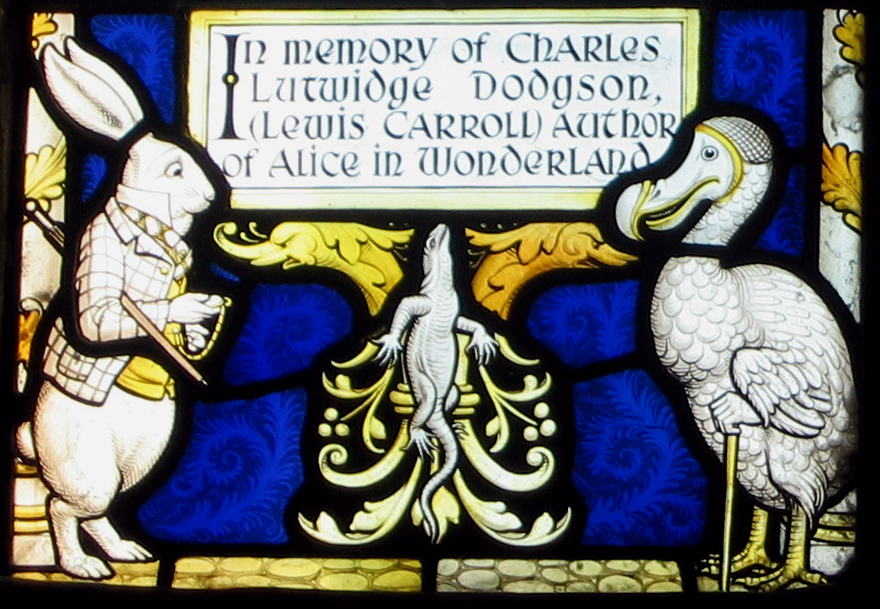

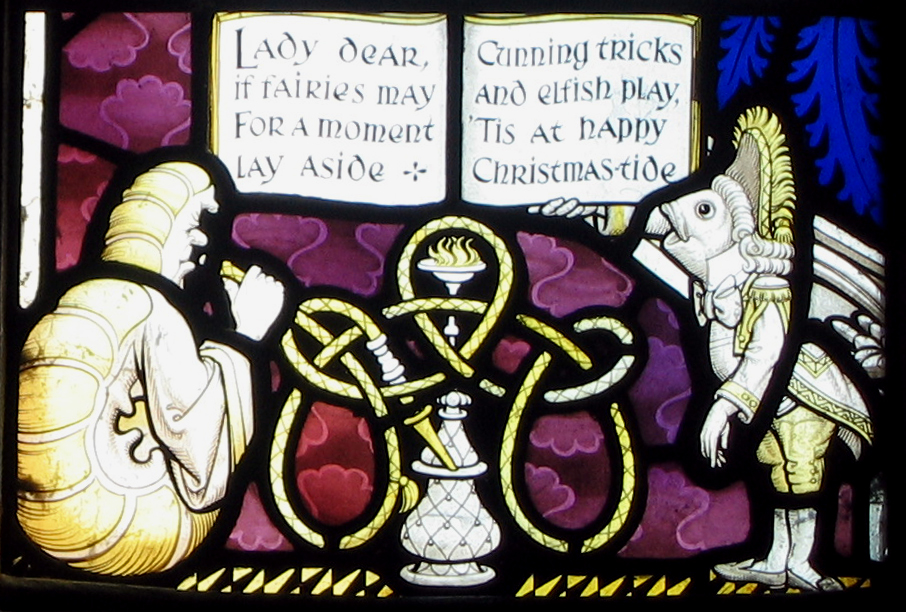

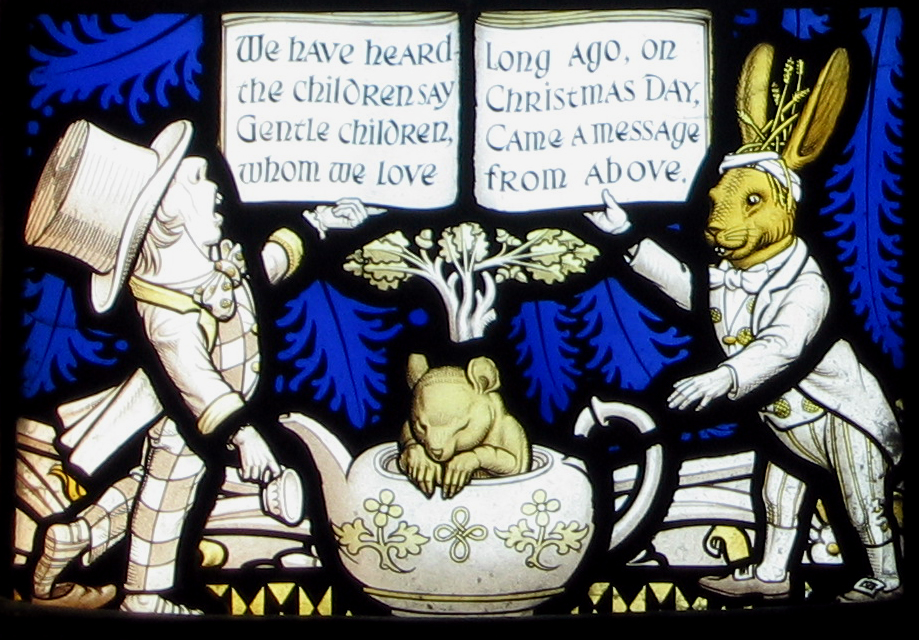

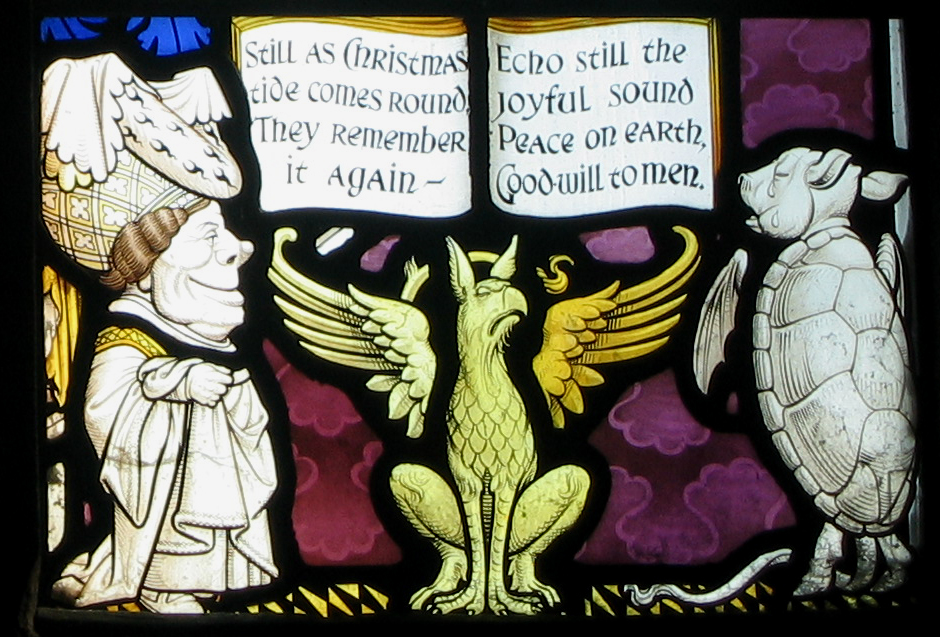

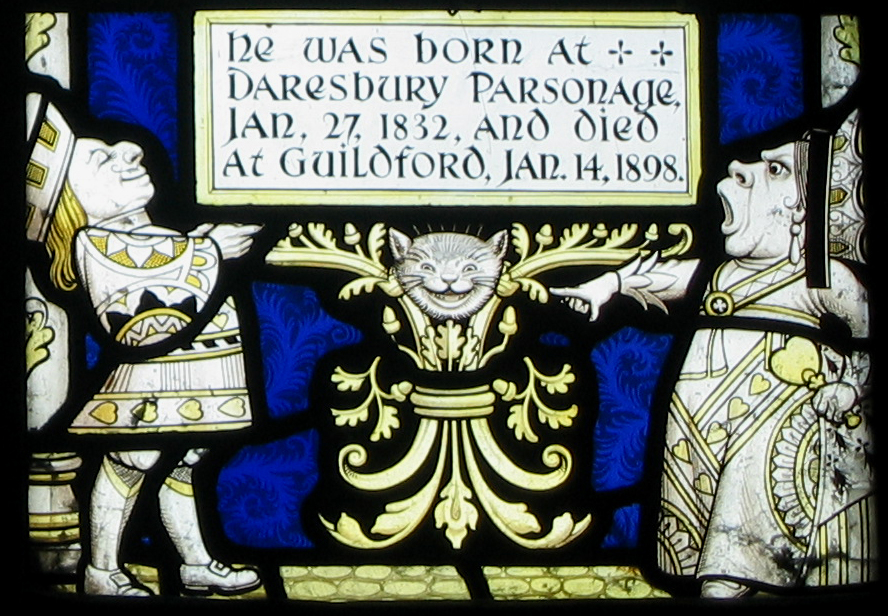

== See also ==
- Grade I and II* listed buildings in Halton (borough)
- Listed buildings in Runcorn (rural area)
- List of ecclesiastical works by Paley and Austin
