= Daresbury =

Village in Cheshire, England

Coordinates: 53.3402°N 2.6332°W

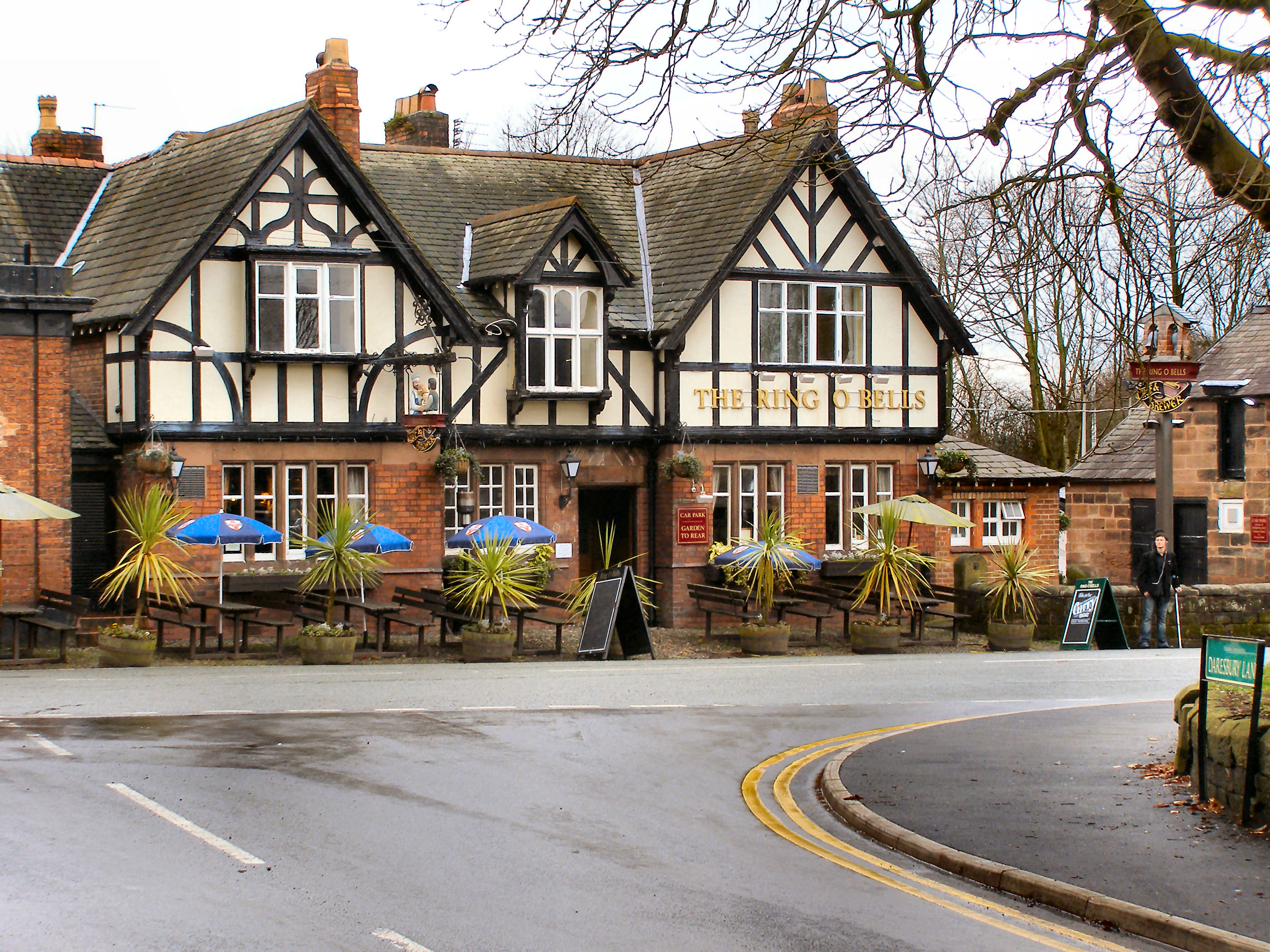
- 'The Ring 'O' Bells' public house, Daresbury

- Location within Cheshire
- Population: 246 (2011 census)
- OS grid reference: SJ5881
- Unitary authority: Borough of Halton
- Ceremonial county: Cheshire
- Region: North West
- Country: England
- Sovereign state: United Kingdom
- Post town: Warrington
- Postcode district: WA4
- Dialling code: 01925
- Police: Cheshire
- Fire: Cheshire
- Ambulance: North West
- UK Parliament: Runcorn and Helsby

Daresbury (/ˈdɑːrzbəri/ DARZ-bə-ree) is a village and civil parish in the Borough of Halton, Cheshire, England. At the 2011 census, it had a population of 246.

== History ==
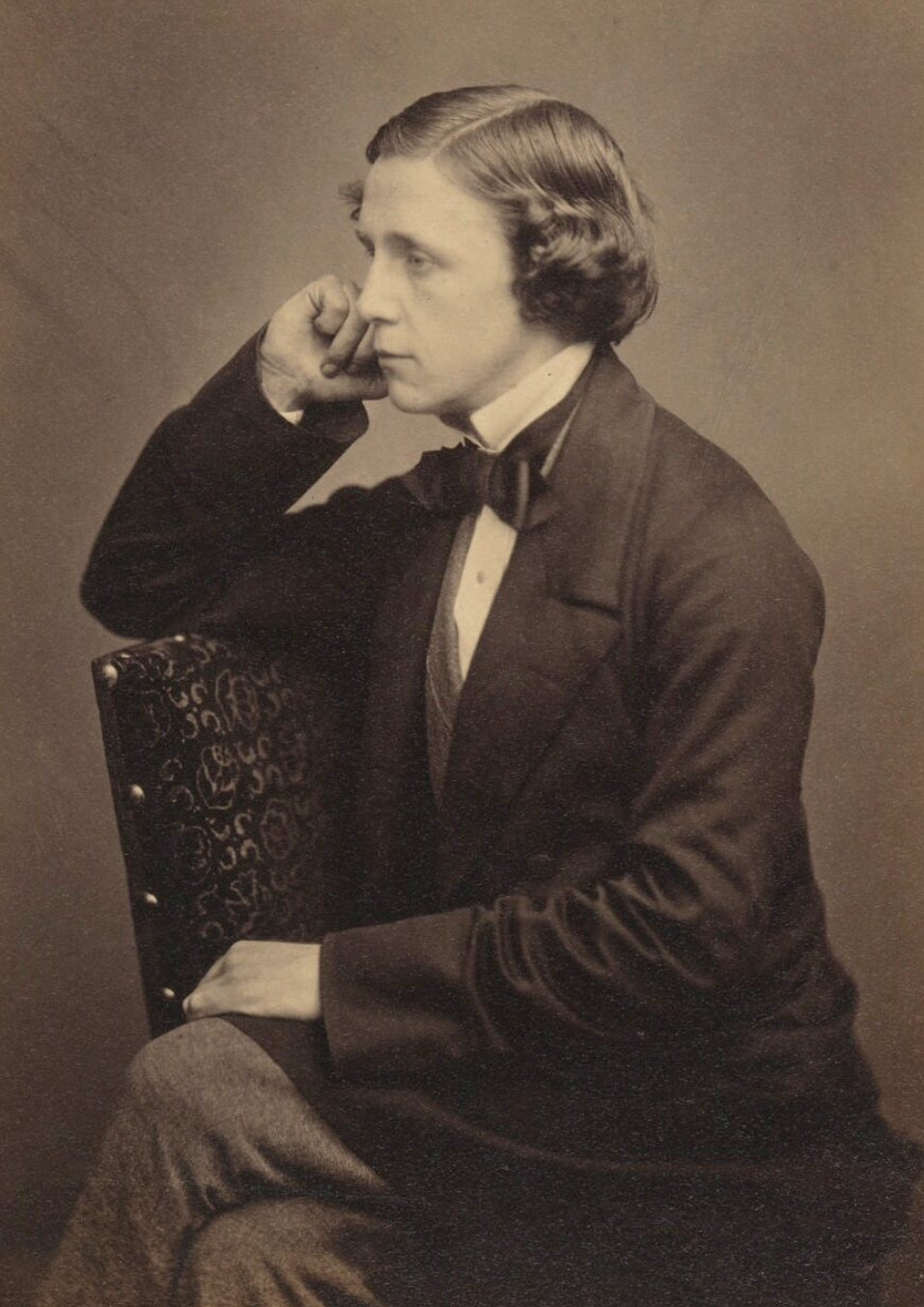
Lewis Carroll, 1857

The name means "Deor's fortification", derived from an Old English personal name and the word burh (a fortified place).

The population was recorded over time at 134 in the census of 1801, 157 in 1851, 153 in 1901, 235 in 1951 and reaching 216 by 2001.

Opened in 1850 on the Birkenhead Railway, the area was served by Daresbury railway station in the nearby village of Moore. The station closed to passengers in 1952 and to goods in 1965, although the line through the station site remains in use.

Daresbury was the birthplace of Alice's Adventures in Wonderland author Lewis Carroll, in All Saints' Vicarage. The village has a Lewis Carroll Visitor Centre and in the parish church of All Saints, a Lewis Carroll window, which includes an image of the Cheshire Cat.

== Landmarks ==
Built in 1759, Daresbury Hall is a former Georgian country house which has been used as a private dwelling, military hospital and residential home. A designated Grade II* listed building since 1952, it is on the Heritage at Risk Register due to being in very poor condition. A major fire in June 2016 destroyed much of the building, which has since been secured with scaffold and mothballed in a roofless condition.

== Governance ==
Daresbury was a township and chapelry in Runcorn parish of Bucklow Hundred, which became a civil parish in 1866. The village was administered as part of Runcorn Rural Sanitary District from 1875, then from 1894 Runcorn Rural District. Local government reorganisation on 1 April 1974 transferred the area to the Borough of Halton.

Daresbury is also an electoral ward. However, the boundary of the ward is different from (and larger than) the parish boundary, and includes the parishes of Moore, Sandymoor and Preston Brook. The total ward population in 2011 was 5,401. Daresbury is represented nationally by the Runcorn and Helsby parliamentary constituency.

== Economy ==
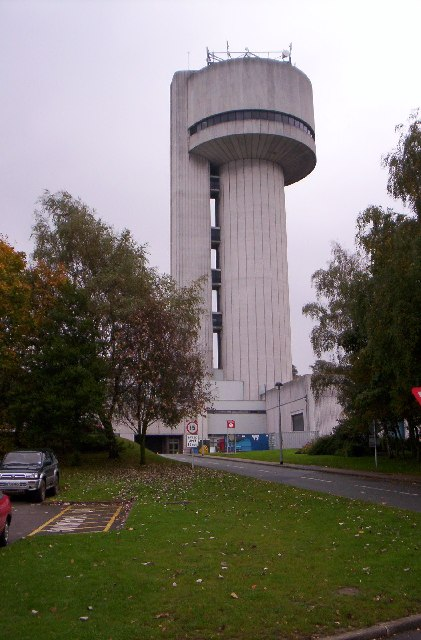
The Tower at Daresbury Laboratory

Near the village is the Science and Technology Facilities Council's Sci-Tech Daresbury science and innovation campus, which includes the Daresbury Laboratory and the Cockcroft Institute. The Synchrotron Radiation Source (SRS) facility at Daresbury Laboratory was in operation between 1981 and 2008.

Daresbury Park is to the south west of the village, at junction 11 of the M56 motorway. The 225 acres (91 ha) site provides office and warehouse space for several businesses and includes the Daresbury Park Hotel.

== Transport ==
The village of Daresbury lies to the east of the realigned A56 road. The B5356 Daresbury Lane heads eastwards from the village towards Hatton and Stretton, while the A558 Daresbury Expressway heads westwards towards Runcorn and crosses the Bridgewater Canal.

== Community and culture ==
In 2006, the annual Creamfields dance festival was held in Daresbury after relocating from the disused Liverpool airport site it had occupied for the six previous years. This saw 40,000 revellers partying from 3pm-6am to a line-up that included live performances from the Prodigy and Zutons, as well as DJ sets from the likes of Sasha, Paul Oakenfold, 2 Many DJ's, Green Velvet and DJ Shadow. The festival has since been an annual event at the site.

== See also ==
- Listed buildings in Runcorn (rural area)
