= St John the Evangelist's Church, Weston =

Church in Runcorn

Coordinates: 53.3190°N 2.73885°W

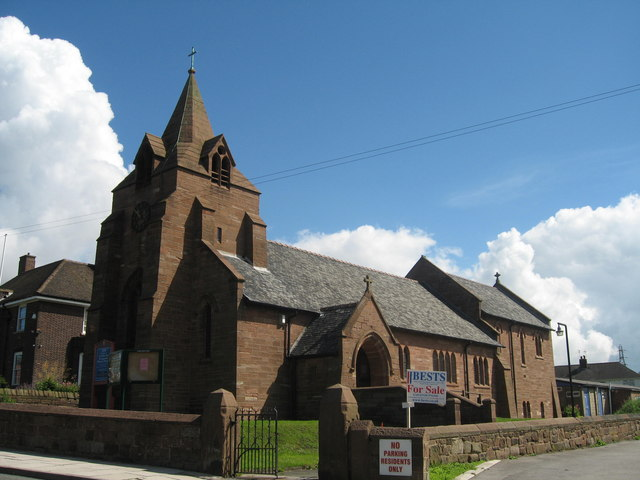
- St John's Church from the southwest

- Location in Cheshire
- OS grid reference: SJ 509,805
- Location: Weston, Runcorn, Cheshire
- Country: England
- Denomination: Anglican
- Website: St John's, Weston

History
- Status: Parish church
- Dedication: Saint John the Evangelist

Architecture
- Functional status: Active
- Heritage designation: Grade II*
- Designated: 5 April 1990
- Architect: Douglas and Fordham
- Architectural type: Church
- Style: Gothic Revival
- Groundbreaking: 1897
- Completed: 1900; 126 years ago

Specifications
- Length: 88.5 ft (27.0 m)
- Materials: Red {{br list sandstone ashlar | Welsh slate roofs}}

Administration
- Province: York
- Diocese: Chester
- Archdeaconry: Chester
- Deanery: Frodsham
- Parish: St John, Weston, Runcorn

St John the Evangelist's Church is in Weston, once a separate village and now part of the town of Runcorn, Cheshire, England. The church is recorded in the National Heritage List for England as a designated Grade II* listed building. It is an active Anglican parish church in the diocese of Chester, the archdeaconry of Chester and the deanery of Frodsham. Its design has been described as "bold and original".

== History ==
The church was built between 1897 and 1898 to a design by Douglas and Fordham at a cost of over £5,000 (equivalent to £560,000 in 2025). It was initially a chapel of ease to Runcorn parish church. To raise funds to build the church, its choirboys wrote thousands of letters to choristers and choirboys of churches and cathedrals throughout the country. This initiative aroused the interest of many people, and over 5,000 donations were received from people in all walks of life. Because of this, it is sometimes known as "the choirboys' church". The tower was added in 1900 at a cost of approximately £700 (equivalent to £70,000 in 2025). A clock costing about £60 made by J. B. Joyce of Whitchurch was added to the tower in 1901. St John's became a separate parish in 1931. In 1998 an automated winding system was added to the clock, also made by Messrs. Joyce, costing £3,250.

== Architecture ==
=== Exterior ===
The church is built from local red sandstone with Welsh slate roofs. Its plan consists of an embraced west tower, a four-bay nave with a narrow north aisle, a south porch approached by a flight of steps, and a chancel which is higher than the nave. The organ chamber is to the north of the chancel and underneath the chancel are vestries. It has a "very short, very powerful west tower with short broach spire", with one set of lucarnes. The church has two massive west buttresses and a shallow buttress to the south. On the west side is a two-light window above which is a clock face. On each side are two-light bell openings.

=== Interior ===
The stone pulpit is polygonal and includes a panel depicting the Crucifixion. The font is also in stone and is octagonal. In the south wall are two stained glass windows. The one to the west depicts Isaiah in a single panel and was made by L. A. Pownall of Falmouth. The other window has four panels depicting Joshua, Saint George, Saint Alban and Gideon; it was made by Percy Bacon of London. The east window depicts the Crucifixion and is by C. E. Kempe. Only one of the windows in the north wall contains stained glass. It depicts two angels; the designer and maker are unknown. The west wall contains a window to the memory of Rev Frank Cartwright, vicar from 1963 to 1968. It contains motifs relating to the Diocese of Worcester where Rev Cartwright was trained, including a figure of Wulfstan of Worcester, and the Diocese of Chester, including a figure of Saint Werburgh. The organ was built by A. Young in 1898 and rebuilt by the Jardine Organ Company in 1981. In the vestry is a framed letter from Robert Baden-Powell, posted from South Africa on 12 August 1900, congratulating the boys of Weston Village for forming an Anti-Smoking Society.

== See also ==
- Grade I and II* listed buildings in Halton (borough)
- List of listed buildings in Runcorn (urban area)
- List of new churches by John Douglas
