= Daresbury railway station =

Former railway station in England

Daresbury
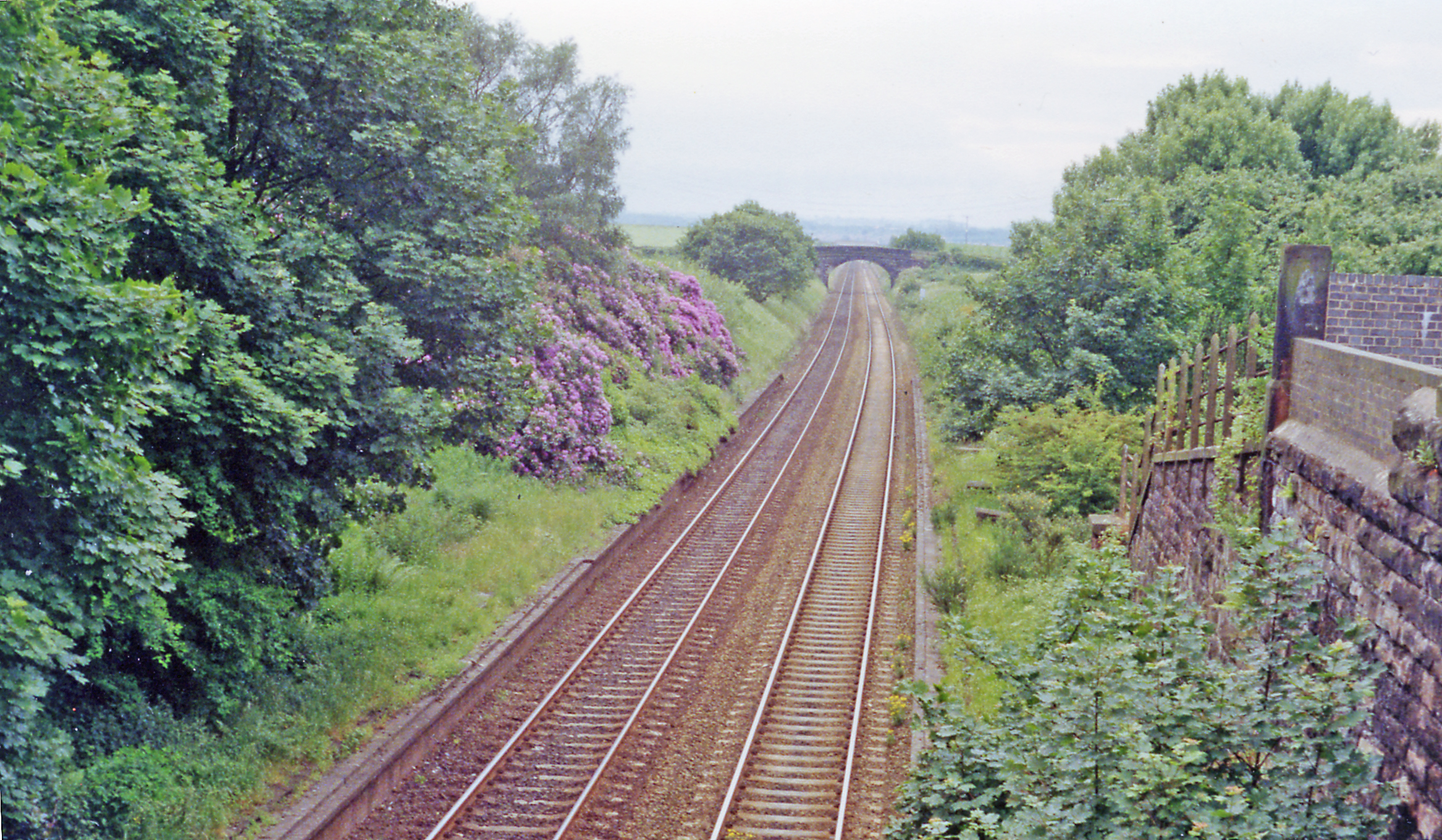
- Site of the station in 1994

General information
- Location: Moore, Halton; England
- Coordinates: 53.3533°N 2.6350°W
- Grid reference: SJ578842
- Platforms: 2

Other information
- Status: Disused

History
- Original company: Birkenhead, Lancashire and Cheshire Junction Railway
- Pre-grouping: Birkenhead Joint Railway
- Post-grouping: Birkenhead Joint Railway

Key dates
- 18 December 1850: Opened as Moore
- April 1861: Renamed Daresbury
- 7 July 1952: Closed
Location

Daresbury railway station was a station in Moore, Cheshire, on the Birkenhead Joint Railway between Runcorn and Warrington.

== History ==
It was named after the village of Daresbury, Cheshire, about a mile away to distinguish it from Moore railway station on the West Coast Main Line. It was open to passengers between 1850 and 1952. It continued to be served by goods trains until full closure in 1965.

== Reopening ==
A proposal to re-open the station was raised by Metro Mayor of the Liverpool City Region Steve Rotheram as part of his re-election plans in March 2024. Rotherham stated that the growth of the nearby industrial and scientific hubs made the station attractive for re-opening.

Preceding station	Historical railways	Following station
Norton	Birkenhead Joint Railway	Warrington Bank Quay
