= Moore railway station =

Former railway station in England

Moore

General information
- Location: Halton; England
- Coordinates: 53.35367°N 2.63975°W
- Grid reference: SJ575842
- Platforms: 2

Other information
- Status: Disused

History
- Original company: Grand Junction Railway
- Pre-grouping: London and North Western Railway
- Post-grouping: London, Midland and Scottish Railway

Key dates
- 4 July 1837: Opened
- 1 January 1917: Station closed
- 1 February 1919: Station reopened
- 1 February 1943: Closed to passengers
- 1952: Closed to rail workers
Location

Moore railway station was a station on the Grand Junction Railway serving the village of Moore in what was then Cheshire, England. It opened on 4 July 1837 when the line opened.

The station is located in Moore cutting on the south side of the road (which is now Runcorn Road) which loops through Moore village passing both this station and Daresbury, also in the village. The road crossed the railway on an over-bridge, with road access down to the station building on the down, western, side of the tracks. In 1865 there was at least one platform at the station.

By 1898 there was evidence of two platforms with a structure on each platform, there was footpath from the over-bridge to the up platform. Although there are no goods facilities recorded at the station in 1904 the map shows a siding with a headshunt into a building labelled Water Works.

The station closed on 1 January 1917 as a temporary war measure and reopened on 1 February 1919 and finally closed to passengers on 1 February 1943, although it was in use by railwaymen until 1952.

No substantive remains exist today.

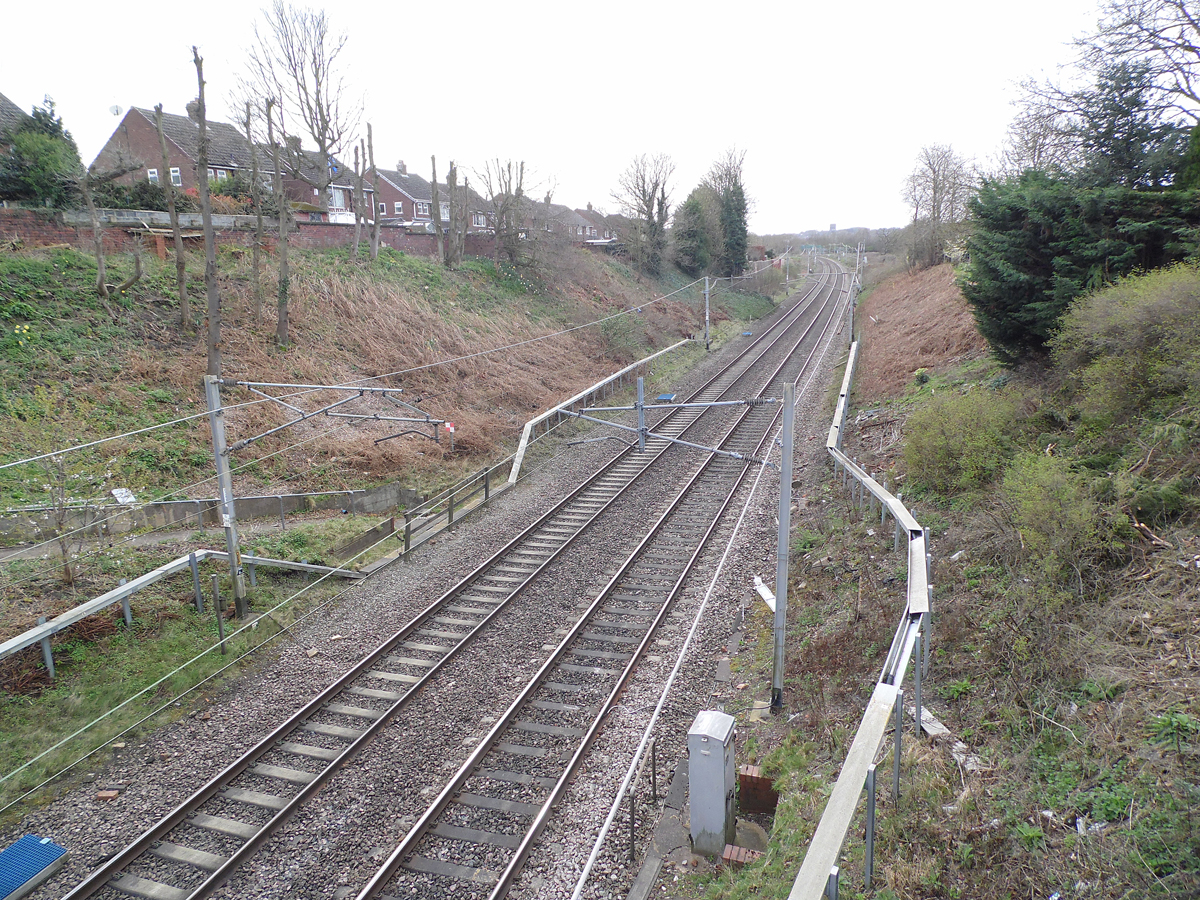
Moore Railway Station site - March 2019

Preceding station	Historical railways	Following station
Preston Brook	London and North Western Railway; Grand Junction Railway	Warrington Bank Quay

== Bibliography ==
- Osborne, E.C.; Osborne, W. (1838). Osborne's guide to the Grand Junction, or Birmingham, Liverpool and Manchester Railway (2nd ed.). London: Simpkin, Marshall and Co.
- Quick, Michael (2023) [2001]. Railway passenger stations in Great Britain: a chronology (PDF). version 5.05. Railway & Canal Historical Society.
- The Railway Clearing House (1970) [1904]. The Railway Clearing House Handbook of Railway Stations 1904 (1970 D&C Reprint ed.). Newton Abbot: David & Charles Reprints. ISBN 0-7153-5120-6.
- Webster, Norman W. (1972). Britain's First Trunk Line:The Grand Junction Railway. Adams & Dart. SBN 239 00105 2.
