= Weston, Runcorn =

Coordinates: 53.320°N 2.739°W

Weston
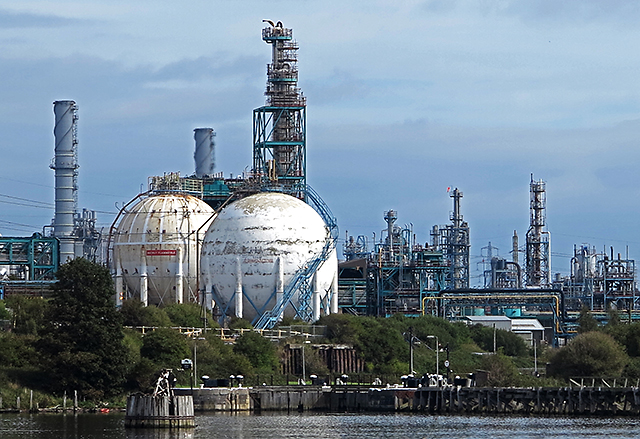
- Rocksavage Works

- Location within Cheshire
- OS grid reference: SJ509806
- Unitary authority: Halton
- Ceremonial county: Cheshire
- Region: North West
- Country: England
- Sovereign state: United Kingdom
- Post town: RUNCORN
- Postcode district: WA7
- Dialling code: 01928
- Police: Cheshire
- Fire: Cheshire
- Ambulance: North West
- UK Parliament: Runcorn and Helsby

Weston or Weston Village is a historic village in the Halton district, in the ceremonial county of Cheshire, England. Formerly a separate village, it is now part of the town of Runcorn.

== History ==
Weston was formerly a township in the parish of Runcorn. In 1866, Weston became a separate civil parish, and on 1 April 1936, the parish was abolished and merged with Runcorn. In 1931, the parish had a population of 3,783.

== Geography ==
Weston overlooks the River Mersey, and the Manchester Ship Canal hugs the bank on the Weston side of the river; the River Weaver joins the Mersey south of Weston. The village is separated from a large Ineos chemical plant by the Weston Point Expressway. The Rocksavage area is named for the house of the same name which was built by the Savage family in the 1560s and fell into ruin in the 18th century.

== Notable buildings ==
The Grade II* listed St John the Evangelist's Church, built of sandstone in 1897, is described by Historic England as "a bold and original design".

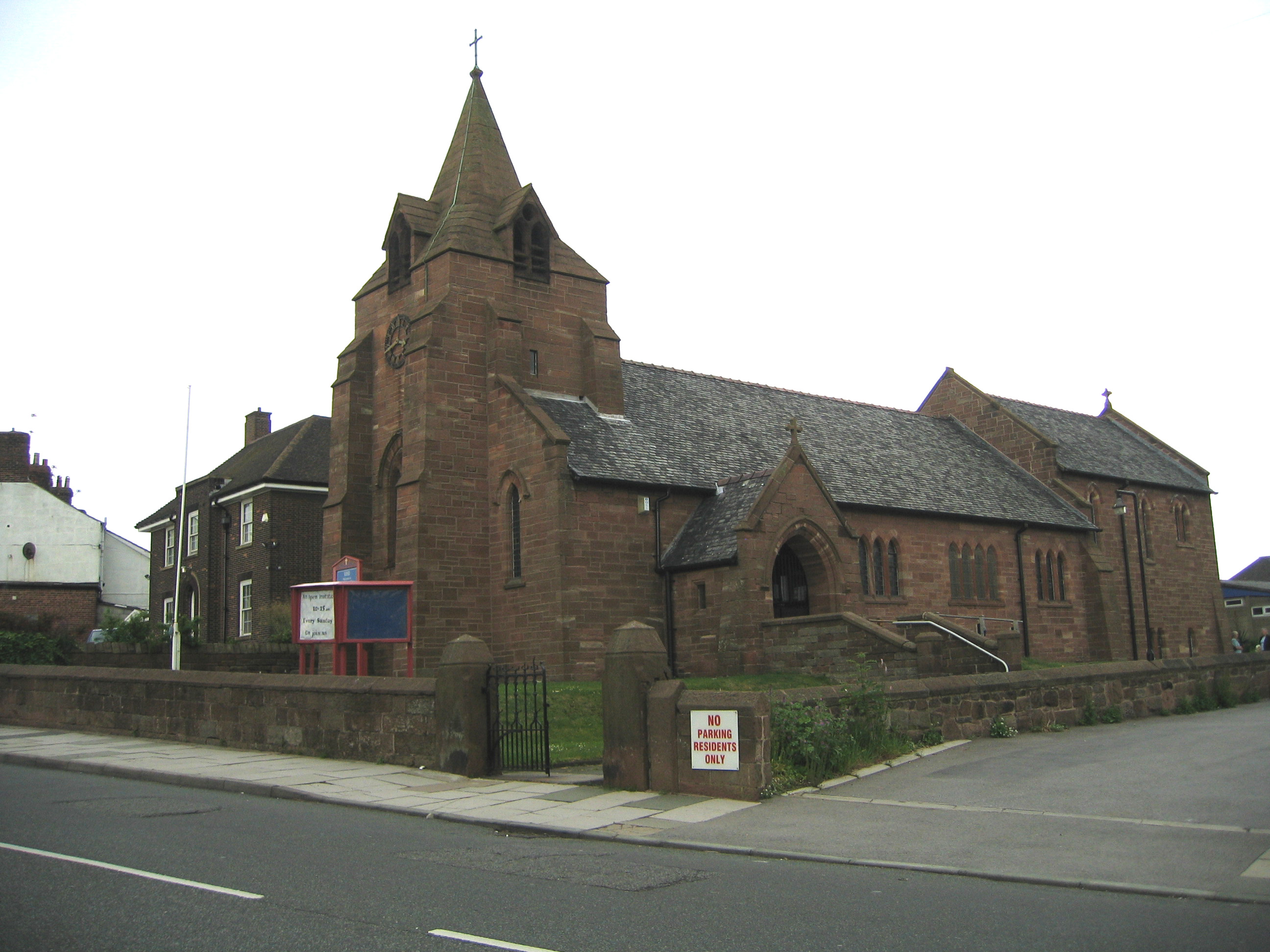
St John the Evangelist's Church

== Industry ==
ICI's Castner-Kellner Works made trichloroethylene and perchloroethylene (tetrachloroethylene) and PVC.

Rocksavage Works, built by ICI from 1938, made chlorinated methane products, and fluorocarbons for aerosol products, under the Arcton trade name. Now owned by Ineos, the works employed 6,000 in its heyday.

Rocksavage Power Station, a gas-fired station opened in 1998, supplies power to the works and the local area.
