= Weston Village =

Weston Village may refer to one of the following places:

- Weston, Ontario, Canada
- Weston, Halton, England
