= Moore Station =

Moore railway station may refer to:

- Moore railway station, England
- Moore Station, Texas
- Moore station (Michigan)
