= Listed buildings in Runcorn (rural area) =

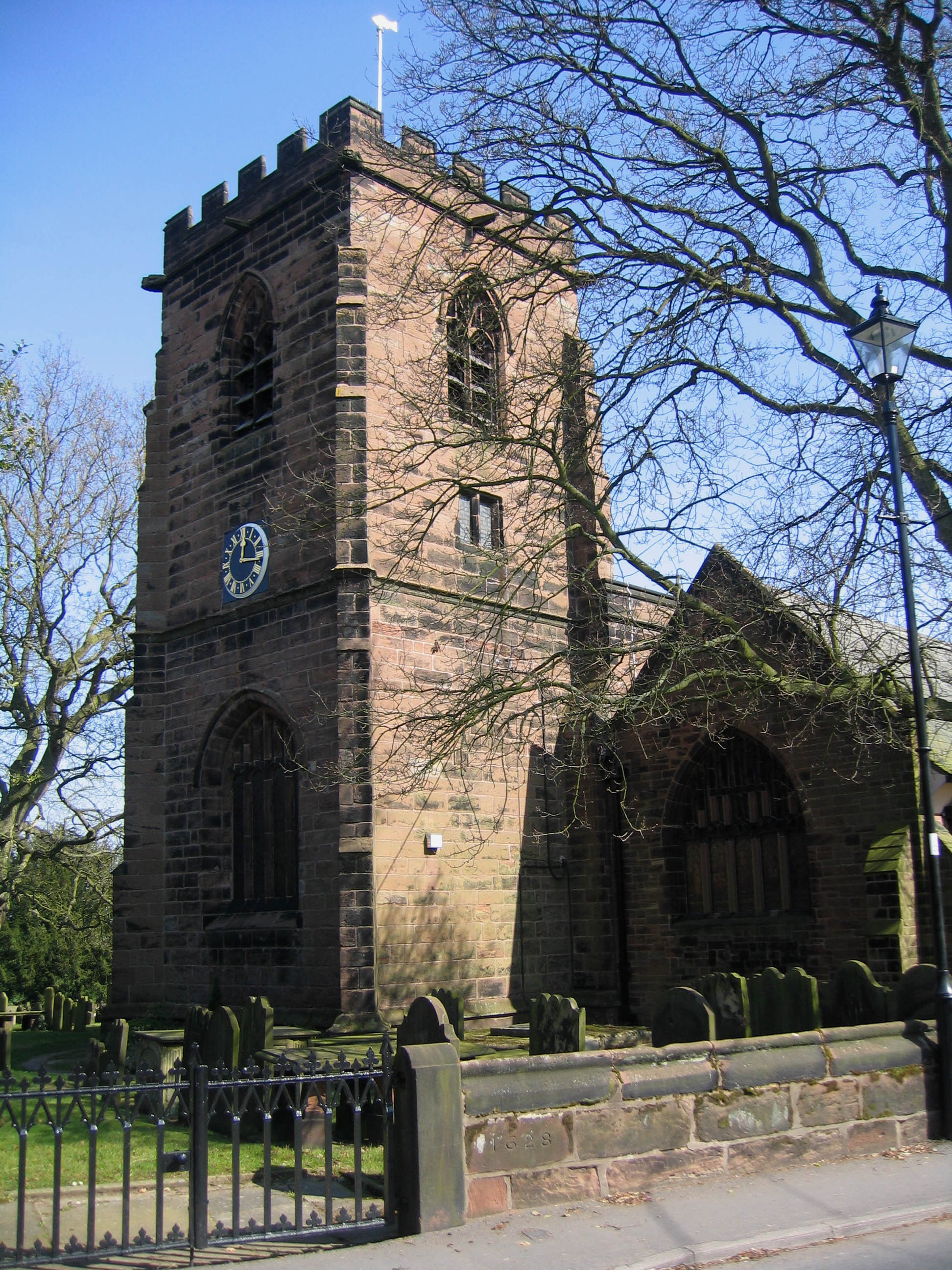
All Saints' Church, Daresbury, listed at Grade II

Runcorn is an industrial town in the borough of Halton, Cheshire, England. This list contains the 27 buildings that are recorded in the National Heritage List for England as designated listed buildings in the part of the borough lying to the south of the River Mersey outside the urban area of Runcorn. The area covered includes the villages of Clifton, Daresbury, Preston Brook, Preston on the Hill, and Moore. Three of the buildings in the area are classified as Grade II*, and the others are at Grade II; there are no buildings in Grade I. In the United Kingdom, the term listed building refers to a building or other structure officially designated as being of special architectural, historical, or cultural significance. These buildings are in three grades: Grade I consists of buildings of outstanding architectural or historical interest; Grade II* includes particularly significant buildings of more than local interest; Grade II consists of buildings of special architectural or historical interest. Buildings in England are listed by the Secretary of State for Culture, Media and Sport on recommendations provided by English Heritage, which also determines the grading.

Although the urban area of Runcorn grew rapidly during the Industrial Revolution, and again with the growth of the New Town during the 1960s and 1970s, the surrounding area, mainly to the west of the town, has experienced only a small growth in population. The villages are small and discrete, and are separated by farmland and woodland. The area covered by the list is crossed by roads, railways, and canals, with which some of the listed buildings are associated. The oldest of these are the canals: the Bridgewater Canal, the Trent and Mersey Canal, the Weaver Navigation and the Manchester Ship Canal. The railways consist of the West Coast Main Line – the section between Crewe and Warrington, and the branch to Liverpool – and the Chester-Manchester Line. The major roads are the M56 motorway and the A6 road, together with sections of the A533, the A557 and the A558 roads.

The ages of the structures on the list range from the ruin of Clifton Hall, built in 1565, to the telephone kiosk in Daresbury, which dates from the 1930s. The three Grade II* listed buildings include the only church in the list and two former mansion houses. The church and one of the mansion houses are in Daresbury, and the other mansion house is in Moore. Daresbury also contains a former sessions house. Moore reflects its rural past with two farmhouses and a number of cottages. Also in the village of Moore are a public house, a former school, and a bridge over the Bridgewater Canal. Preston Brook stands on the junction of the Bridgewater and the Trent and Mersey Canals; other than one listed house, the structures are associated with the canals – a former warehouse, a tunnel entrance, a milepost, and two air shafts. Other listed buildings are in more isolated sites and include another farmhouse, another canal bridge, a swing bridge over the Manchester Ship Canal, and a railway viaduct over the Weaver Navigation and A557 road.

== Key ==
Grade	Criteria
II*	Particularly important buildings of more than special interest
II	Buildings of national importance and special interest
"—" denotes a work that is not listed.

== Listed buildings ==
region:GB-HAL_type:landmark|name	Photograph	Grade	Date	Location	Description
All Saints' Church	Photograph of the church from the south, showing the tower and part of the south aisle, partly obstructed by trees	II*	16th century and 1871	Daresbury; 53.3406°N 2.6312°W	The parish church of Daresbury was rebuilt in 1871, and retains its 16th-century tower. It is built in red sandstone with a slate roof. Lewis Carroll was born in the vicarage; a stained-glass window in the church depicts characters from his books.
Moore Hall	Photograph of the three-storey hall, painted white, framed by trees	II*	Early 18th century	Moore; 53.3542°N 2.6311°W	Built in rendered brick with a slate roof, this former mansion house has five bays and three storeys, rusticated quoins and a cornice at the second-floor level.
Daresbury Hall	Photograph of the Georgian style hall in three storeys, showing three bays with three windows in the central bay and two windows in each of the lateral bays	II*	1759	Daresbury; 53.3380°N 2.6257°W	This former mansion house is built in brown brick with a slate roof in three storeys and three bays. It incorporates a stone plinth and floor bands, rusticated giant pilasters and matching stone quoins.
Clifton Hall	A ruined sandstone wall seen in the distance across a field, including a pair of gateposts on the left.	II	1565	Cholmondeley Road, Clifton; 53.3159°N 2.7141°W	Once the second-largest house in Cheshire, this former Elizabethan mansion is now a ruin and only fragments of sandstone walling remain.
Manor Farm House	A brick and sandstone house near a road, with two gables and a dormer window, all timber framed.	II	1660	129 Runcorn Road, Moore; 53.3536°N 2.6379°W	This former farm house has been heavily restored. It is constructed in sandstone, brick and timber framing, and has a tile roof. It is in two storeys and three bays, and has a west gabled projection.
Village Farm House	A sandstone house behind a pair of ornamental gateposts (which are listed separately)	II	Late 17th century with later alterations	128 Runcorn Road, Moore; 53.3537°N 2.6371°W	Built in stone with a stone-slate roof in two storeys with an attic, this former farm house originally had four bays but the original window openings have been built up and new windows inserted.
Red Lion public house	A cream-coloured public house with window boxes in front of which are picnic-type tables.	II	Late 17th century with later alterations	Runcorn Road, Moore; 53.3533°N 2.6366°W	This public house is built in whitened brick with a slate roof in two storeys with bays. It has an arched entrance with a blank fanlight.
Old Hall Farmhouse	Photograph of brick farmhouse	II	Early 18th century	Runcorn Road, Moore; 53.3535°N 2.6359°W	Built in brick with a slate roof, this former farmhouse has two bays and two storeys plus an attic, stone quoins and a stone plinth.
Black Jane farm house	A symmetrical Georgian style, brick-built farmhouse in five bays with a short wing on each side.	II	1729	Newton Lane, Daresbury; 53.3228°N 2.6060°W	This farm house is constructed in brown brick with a slate roof. It has two storeys and five bays with later additions. It includes stone flush quoins and a timber doorcase.
Old Farm House Cottages	A brick building by a road, asymmetrical with a blue door at the front of the right-hand cottage.	II	1758	110–112 Runcorn Road, Moore; 53.3535°N 2.6355°W	Built in brown brick with a slate roof, this pair of cottages is in two storeys plus an attic with three bays. The original door to No. 112 has been replaced by a window that matches the others.
George Gleave's bridge	The bridge spans the canal with a footpath on the left and trees on each flank.	II	c. 1772	Near Daresbury; 53.33705°N 2.64651°W	This is an accommodation bridge connecting two fields, crossing the Bridgewater Canal. It is built in red brick with ashlar sandstone dressings and consists of a single-span segmental arch.
Moore bridge	The bridge crosses the canal with a wide footpath on the left and long boats visible through the arch.	II	c. 1772	Moore; 53.3544°N 2.6319°W	This is a road bridge over the Bridgewater Canal built in red brick with a stone carriageway and parapet. It is steeply humped and is wide enough for only one vehicle.
Former warehouse	A brick building by the canal with three storeys and a loading bay on the left protruding towards the canal.	II	c. 1772	Preston Brook; 53.3185°N 2.6485°W	Standing alongside the Bridgewater Canal, this former warehouse is built in brick with a slate roof. It has been converted into residential use. It has three storeys with seven widely spaced window bays on the east side and four additional gabled loading bays on the west.
Preston Brook Tunnel north entrance	The canal enters the tunnel through and arch and on the right a road curves towards the left to cross the bridge.	II	c. 1777	Preston Brook; 53.3144°N 2.6463°W	This is the entrance to the tunnel linking the south end of the Bridgewater Canal with the Trent and Mersey Canal. It is built in red brick with stone dressings.
Canal air shaft (north)	A cylindrical brick structure almost surrounded by vegetation.	II	c. 1777	Preston Brook; 53.3139°N 2.6460°W	Located towards the northern end of the tunnel carrying the Trent and Mersey Canal, this is the top of an air shaft. It is circular, built in blue brick, 6 feet (2 m) in diameter, and 6 feet (2 m) high.
Canal air shaft (south)	A cylindrical brick structure standing by a footpath.	II	c. 1777	Preston Brook; 53.3112°N 2.6446°W	Towards the southern end of the tunnel carrying the Trent and Mersey Canal, the top of this air shaft is circular, built in blue brick, 6 feet (2 m) in diameter, and 9 feet (3 m) high.
Ivy Cottage	A brick house with four sash windows and a green front door.	II	Mid-18th century	106 Runcorn Road, Moore; 53.3536°N 2.6348°W	The house is constructed of brown brick with a slate roof in two storeys with three bays. It has a stone doorcase with Tuscan columns, and an open pediment with an arched blank tympanum.
The Pebbles	A brick house with four sash windows and one window bricked up.	II	Mid-18th century	109 Runcorn Road, Moore; 53.3533°N 2.6358°W	This house is built in brown brick with a concrete tile roof in two storeys with three bays. It has a stone doorcase with Tuscan columns, and an open pediment with an arched blank tympanum. The opening for the centre window in the first floor is blank.
Brook House	A long cottage in two storeys with tall chimneys and windows with intricate white-painted tracery.	II	Late 18th century	Preston Brook; 53.3215°N 2.6504°W	In Gothic style, this cottage is built in whitened brick with a slate roof. It is in two storeys with four bays, plus one bay added to the south. The windows have lozenge glazing.
Roselea and Briardene	Cottages in two storeys by the road behind a hedge, with a single tall central chimney.	II	Late 18th century	Moss Lane, Moore; 53.3562°N 2.6373°W	This pair of cottages is built in brown brick in two storeys with four bays. It has a roof of "very large" slates, and the original three-light horizontal-sliding sash windows are still present.
Canal mile post	A black post supports a plaque which says on the left "Shardlow 92 miles" and on the right "Preston Brook".	II	1819	Preston Brook; 53.313°N 2.646°W	This is the mile post near the north end of the Trent and Mersey Canal showing the distance to the terminus at Shardlow as "92 miles" (which is 148 km). It is made in cast iron, painted black and white, and consists of a circular post with a moulded head and embossed letters on two convex tablets.
Sessions house	A symmetrical single-storey brick building with a central white tablet almost the height of the building, windows with complex tracery on each side, and, in the front, picnic-type tables and a menu board.	II	1841	Daresbury; 53.3408°N 2.6331°W	This is a former sessions house that is now used by the adjoining public house. It is built in red brick with a slate roof, in one storey with three bays. The middle bay has a plastered recess containing a tablet with a Latin inscription giving the purpose and date of the building.
Sutton Weaver viaduct	A brick arch over a road, with the start of an iron arch on the left.	II	1848–50	Clifton Road, Sutton Weaver; 53.3059°N 2.7014°W	The Chester-Manchester railway line crosses the A557 road and the Weaver Navigation on this viaduct, which has a cast iron span and brick abutments.
Former primary school	A single-storey brick building with a gable on the front, a door on the side and a short wall and a hedge in front.	II	1878	Moss Lane, Moore; 53.3547°N 2.6357°W	This was a primary school built in brown brick with stone dressings and a stone slate roof. It is in a single storey with four bays in an "L" plan. In the front gable is a crest containing three carved birds.
Swing bridge	A metal swing bridge on the left over the canal, a metal pylon in the middle and brick support buildings on the right.	II	c. 1878	Moore Lane, Moore; 53.3630°N 2.6351°W	This swing bridge crosses the Manchester Ship Canal and is operated from the north bank by hydraulic water power. The support buildings are of red brickwork with slate roofs.
Gate piers, gate and side walls	The ornamental gate piers, the metal gate and the sandstone side walls in front of the farmhouse.	II	19th century	128 Runcorn Road, Moore; 53.3536°N 2.6371°W	The gate piers of Village Farm House are made from yellow sandstone. They are in Jacobean Revival style and hold a wrought iron screen with overthrows.
War memorial		II	1920	Daresbury; 53.34112°N 2.63162°W	The war memorial is at an intersection of paths in the churchyard of All Saints' Church. It is in stone and consists of a tall, tapering, octagonal shaft carrying a blind wheel-head cross, each quarter of which is decorated with a carved fleur-de-lis. The base of the shaft is moulded and stands on an octagonal plinth on a base of four octagonal steps. On the plinth and steps are stones plaques with inscriptions and the names of those who were lost in both World Wars.
Telephone kiosk	A telephone kiosk painted bright red with a post box and flowers tubs behind.	II	1935	Chester Road, Daresbury; 53.340636°N 2.632830°W	This type K6 telephone kiosk was designed by Sir Giles Gilbert Scott. It is made in cast iron and is painted red. It is included in the list because of its group value with All Saints' Church and the sessions house.

== See also ==
- List of listed buildings in Runcorn (urban area)
- Grade I listed buildings in Cheshire
- Grade II* listed buildings in Cheshire
