= Holy Trinity Church, Runcorn =

Coordinates: 53.3422°N 2.72817°W

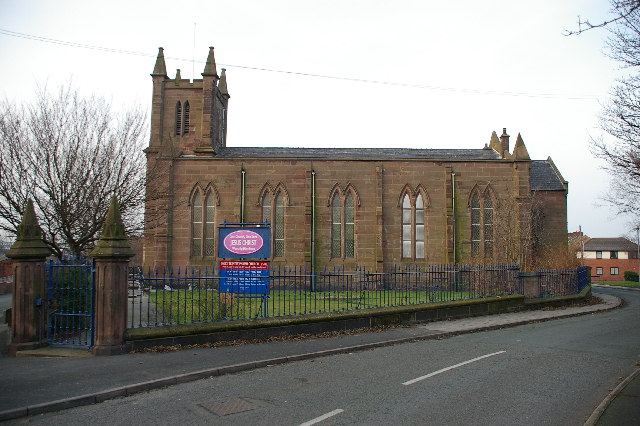
- Holy Trinity Church, Runcorn, from the south

- Location in Cheshire
- OS grid reference: SJ 516 831
- Location: Runcorn, Cheshire
- Country: England
- Denomination: Anglican
- Website: Holy Trinity, Runcorn

History
- Status: Parish church
- Dedication: Holy Trinity

Architecture
- Functional status: Active
- Heritage designation: Grade II
- Designated: 31 October 1983
- Architect: Joseph Hartley
- Architectural type: Church
- Style: Gothic Revival
- Groundbreaking: 1838
- Completed: 1857; 169 years ago

Specifications
- Materials: Red sandstone, slate roof

Administration
- Province: York
- Diocese: Chester
- Archdeaconry: Chester
- Deanery: Frodsham
- Parish: Holy Trinity, Runcorn

Holy Trinity Church is in Runcorn, Cheshire, England. It is an active Anglican parish church in the diocese of Chester, the archdeaconry of Chester and the deanery of Frodsham. Its benefice is combined with that of All Saints, Runcorn. It is recorded in the National Heritage List for England as a designated Grade II listed building.

== History ==
The church was built in 1838 as an evangelical alternative to the parish church of Runcorn. The cost was met by public subscription, with John and Thomas Johnson, soap and alkali manufacturers, being the principal subscribers. It was designed by Joseph Hartley, a local architect, and the church was built by William Rigby, a local builder. The original chancel was short and a longer chancel was added in 1857.

== Architecture ==
=== Exterior ===
The church is built in red sandstone with a slate roof. Its plan consists of a west tower which is partly embraced, a five-bay nave and a chancel. The main entrance is through a door on the west face of the tower. Above this is a three-lancet window and paired louvred bell-openings. The summit has pyramid pinnacles and a crenellated parapet.

=== Interior ===
The reredos is made from marble. The altar and pulpit are oak, the latter being on a stone base. The choir stalls are carved with poppyheads. At the west end of the church is a wooden gallery on round cast iron columns. The stained glass in the east window probably dates from the 1860s, and is probably by William Wailes. The three-manual organ dates from 1908 and its building was assisted by a grant from Andrew Carnegie.

== See also ==
- Listed buildings in Runcorn (urban area)
