= Grade II* listed buildings in Cheshire =

Cheshire shown within England

The county of Cheshire is divided into four unitary authorities: Cheshire West and Chester, Cheshire East, Warrington, and Halton.

As there are 390 Grade II* listed buildings in the county, they have been split into separate lists for each unitary authority.

- Grade II* listed buildings in Cheshire West and Chester
- Grade II* listed buildings in Cheshire East
- Grade II* listed buildings in Warrington
- Grade II* listed buildings in Halton (borough)

== See also ==
- Grade I listed buildings in Cheshire
