= Moore Hall, Cheshire =

Country house in Moore, Cheshire, England

Coordinates: 53.3542°N 2.6311°W

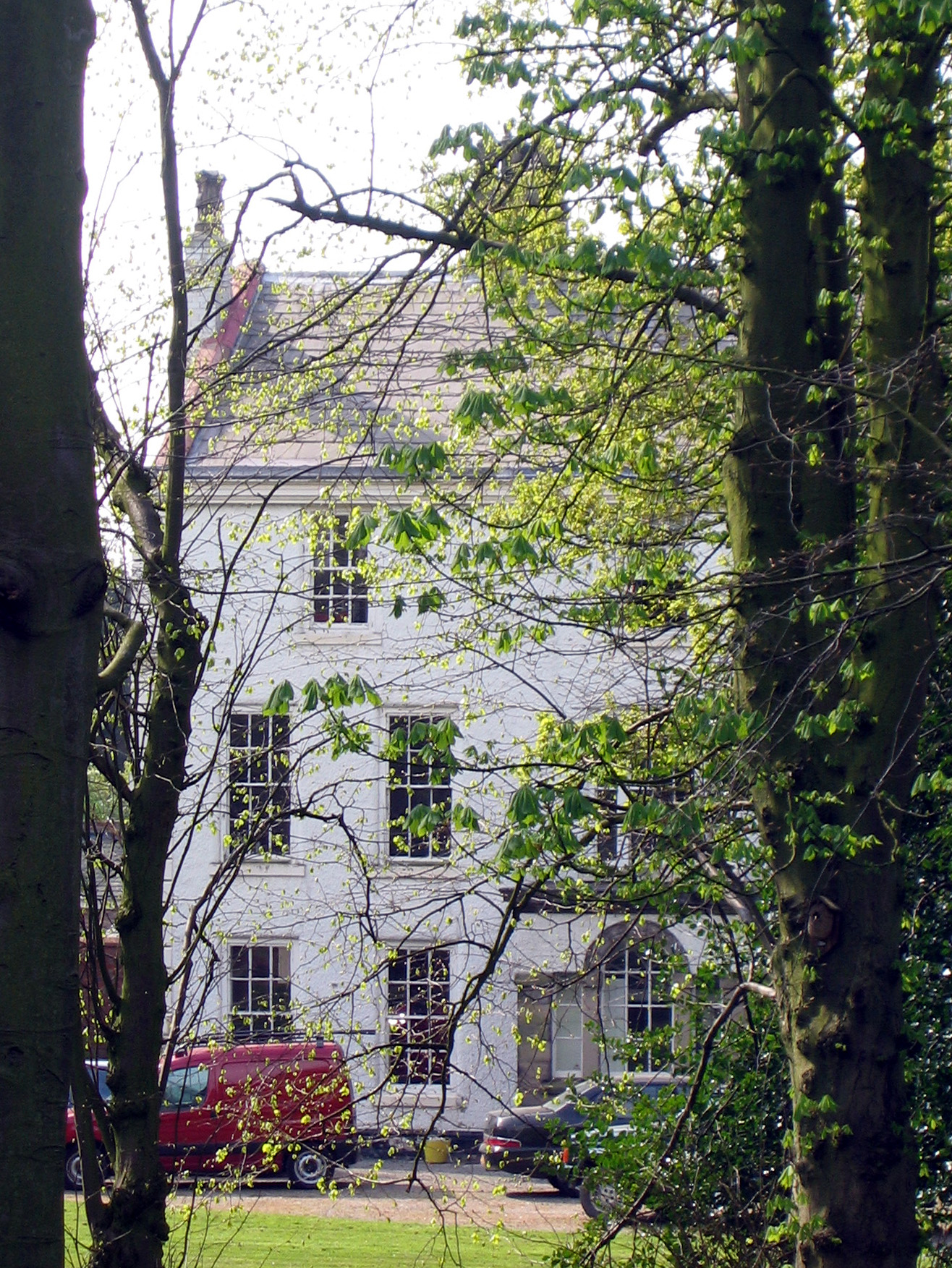
Moore Hall

Moore Hall is a country house located in the village of Moore, Cheshire, England. It was built in the early 18th century, and is constructed in roughcast brick with a slate roof. The house has three storeys, and is in five bays. The porch is a more modern, and is fronted by a Venetian window. The windows are sashes. The house is recorded in the National Heritage List for England as a designated Grade II* listed building.

== See also ==
- Grade I and II* listed buildings in Halton (borough)
- Listed buildings in Runcorn (rural area)
