= Daresbury Hall =

Country house in Cheshire, England

Coordinates: 53.33798°N 2.62575°W

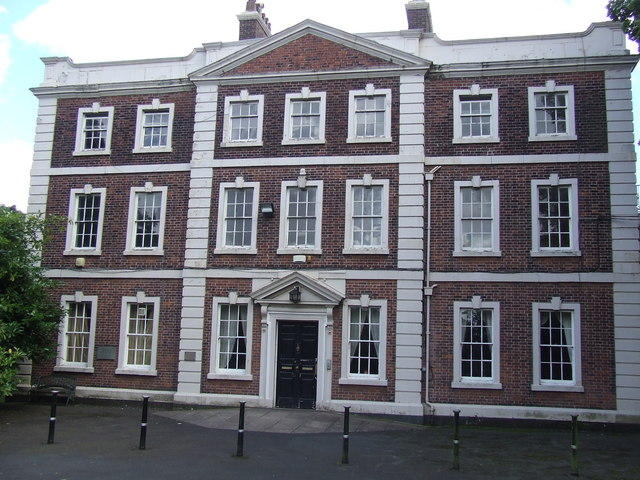
Daresbury Hall (prior to 2016 fire)

Daresbury Hall is a former Georgian country house in the village of Daresbury, Cheshire, England. It was built in 1759 for George Heron. The house is recorded in the National Heritage List for England as a designated Grade II* listed building. The mansion was badly damaged by fire in 2016.

== History ==
Built in 1759 for George Heron, the hall descended in the Heron family until 1850, when it became the property of Samuel Beckett Chadwick. By 1892 it had been acquired by Sir Gilbert Greenall, later Baron Daresbury.

During the Second World War it was used as a military hospital and for some years from 1955 by a charity, now known as Scope, as a residential home for disabled people.

It became semi-derelict after being bought by a millionaire who died before restoration could take place. In April 2015, a large cannabis farm containing six hundred plants with an estimated street value of £750,000 was discovered in an annex at the estate. In 2016 there were plans to partly demolish and convert the house but in June of that year the empty building was badly damaged by fire.

== Description ==
The house is constructed in a Georgian style in brown brick with stone dressings, and has a slate roof. It has three storeys and seven bays with a stone plinth and stone bands between the storeys. Framing the middle three bays are rusticated pilasters, and similar quoins at the corners. All the windows are sash windows. Along the top of the house is a plain parapet, with a pediment above the central three bays.

== See also ==
- Grade I and II* listed buildings in Halton (borough)
- Listed buildings in Runcorn (rural area)
