= All Saints' Church, Runcorn =

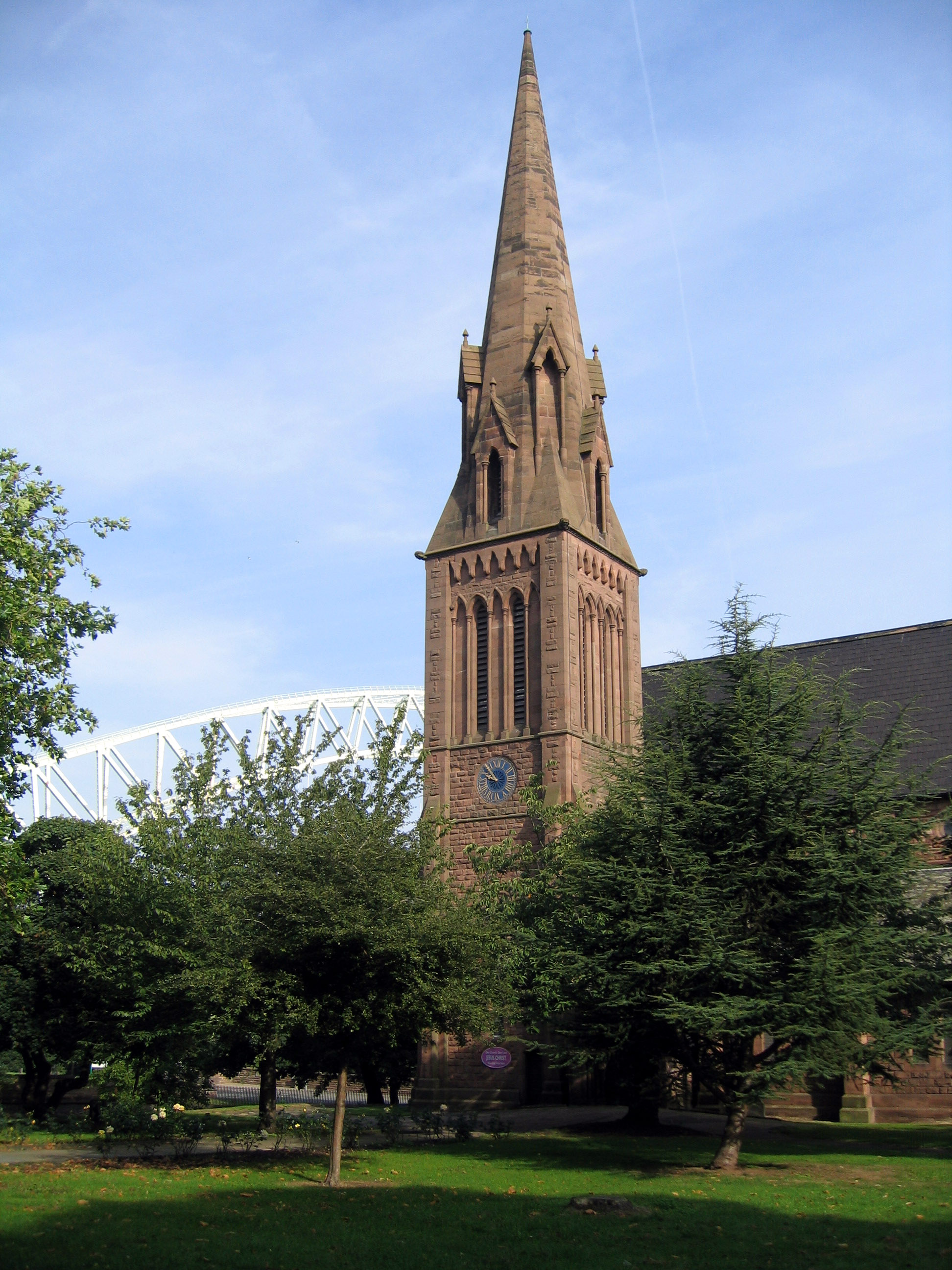
- All Saints' Church, Runcorn

- Location in Cheshire
- 53.3435°N 2.73656°W
- OS grid reference: SJ 511,833
- Location: Runcorn, Cheshire
- Country: England
- Denomination: Anglican
- Website: All Saints with Holy Trinity, Runcorn

History
- Status: Parish church

Architecture
- Functional status: Active
- Heritage designation: Grade II*
- Designated: 7 December 1965
- Architect: Anthony Salvin
- Architectural type: Church
- Style: Gothic Revival (Early English)
- Groundbreaking: 1847
- Completed: 1849; 177 years ago
- Construction cost: £8,052

Specifications
- Capacity: 1,060
- Materials: Sandstone, slate roof

Administration
- Province: York
- Diocese: Chester
- Archdeaconry: Chester
- Deanery: Frodsham
- Parish: Runcorn

Clergy
- Vicar: Rev Karen Andrews

All Saints' Church is the parish church of Runcorn, Cheshire, England, sited on the south bank of the River Mersey overlooking Runcorn Gap. There is a tradition that the first church on the site was founded by Ethelfleda in 915. That was replaced, probably in about 1250, by a medieval church that was altered and extended in the 14th and 15th centuries. By the 19th century the building's structure had deteriorated and become dangerous, and it was replaced by a new church, built between 1847 and 1849 to the designs of Anthony Salvin.

The church is built in local sandstone and is in Early English style with a tall steeple at the southwest corner. Some of the furniture in the church was moved from the previous building, as were some of the memorials, the majority of which are to members of the Brooke family from nearby Norton Priory.

All Saints is an active Anglican parish church in the diocese of Chester, arranging services on Sundays and home groups during the week, in addition to weddings and funerals. The church is designated as a Grade II* listed building.

== History ==
A church has stood on the site of the present structure for centuries. There is a tradition that the first church was founded in 915 by Ethelfleda when she built a castle nearby. Dedicated to St Bertelin, it was probably a simple structure of wood and thatch. Runcorn is not mentioned in the Domesday Book, but there is evidence that Nigel, the first baron of Halton (died 1080), conferred the church with a priest "in the days of the Conqueror". A medieval church was subsequently built on the site, during the 19th-century demolition of which Norman capitals were found in the masonry of its tower. Judging by its Early English style of architecture, the local historian H. F. Starkey estimates that the medieval church was probably built in about 1250. The chancel was rebuilt in the 14th century with Decorated tracery in the east window. During the same century an embattled tower was built at the west end of the church, and this was either rebuilt or increased in size in the following century. A major item of the church furniture was a pre-Reformation rood screen. It was destroyed when the church was rebuilt in the 19th century, although a few fragments were used in the construction of the present choir stalls. The nave of the church measured 52 feet (16 m) by 40 feet (12 m) and the tower was 57 feet (17 m) high. At some time the dedication of the church was changed from St Bertelin to St Bartholomew, and later to All Saints.

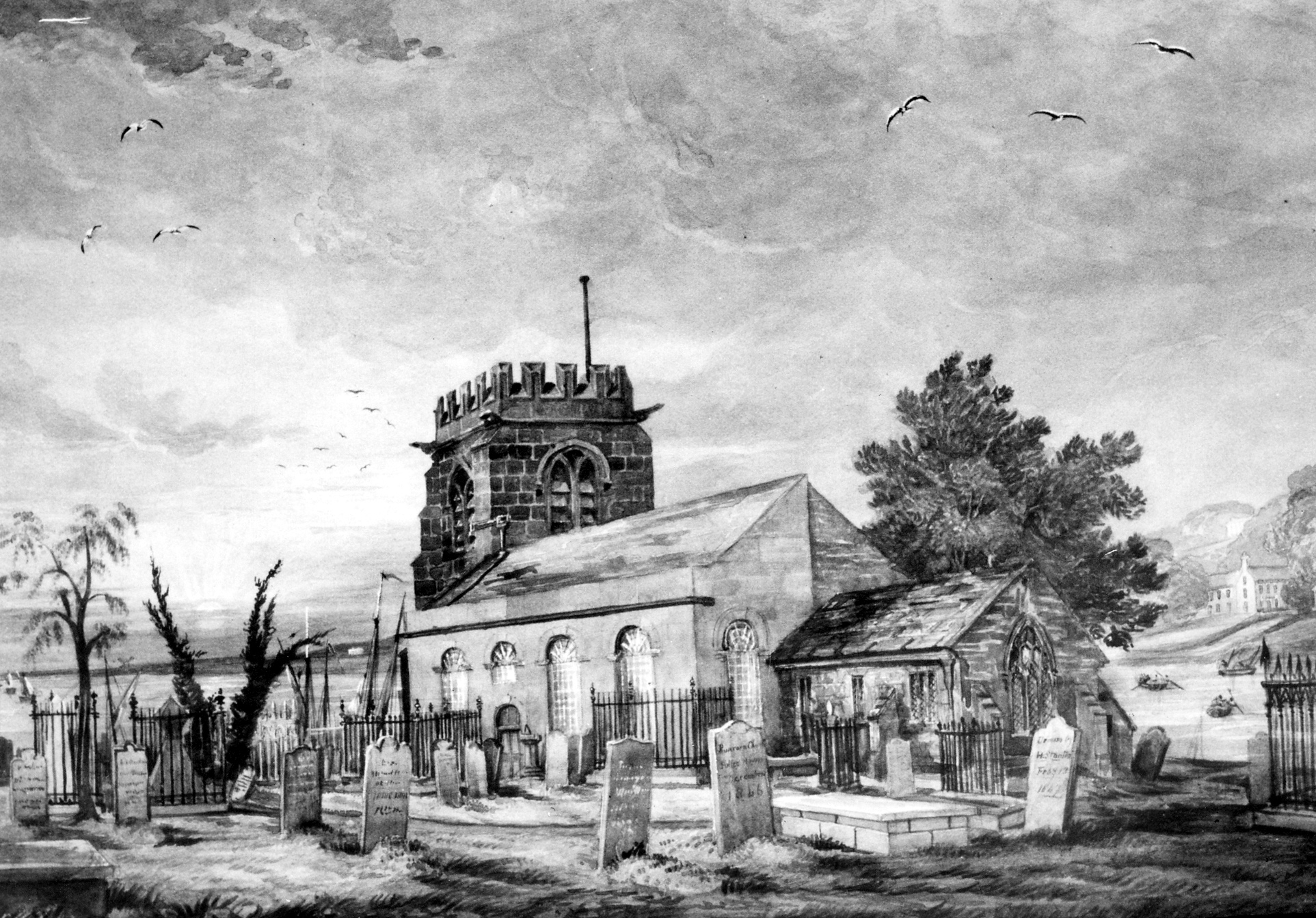
Medieval church in 1846

By the 18th century the south aisle was in a serious state of decay, and in 1740 it was rebuilt in brick. In 1801 a commission reported that the church "was too small to conveniently contain the inhabitants of the parish". It was extended by enlarging the south aisle and by adding galleries to it and to the west end. The former Gothic windows were replaced by round-headed windows. During the first half of the 19th century there was increasing concern about the fabric of the church. The tower was becoming dangerous, and the vestry gave orders "that the bells were not to be rung". In 1817 it was recommended that the height of the tower should be reduced. The south wall of the chancel was leaning and only kept in position by its roof. The south aisle, built only 15 years before, was sinking, and gaps were appearing around the windows. It was concluded that the church should be demolished and replaced. Some temporary repairs were carried out but there was insufficient money available to rebuild the church at that time. In July 1843 it was reported that the church was in a "very dangerous condition", and calls were made for "necessary repairs to be made forthwith". By December of that year architectural reports had been obtained from the architectural firm of Scott and Moffatt, and from Anthony Salvin, both of which concluded that the church was beyond repair. In September 1846 the last sermon was preached from the medieval church, and by November contracts for building a new church were completed.

The new church was designed by Salvin. Its foundation stone was laid at Easter 1847 by Richard Brooke, the eldest son of Sir Richard Brooke of Norton Priory, and the church was consecrated by Dr John Graham, Bishop of Chester on 11 January 1849. The church, which provided seating for 1,600 people, cost £8,052 to build, met by public subscriptions and by the parish rate. The major donors were Miss Orred, the largest land owner in the town, Sir Richard Brooke, the dean and chapter of Christ Church, Oxford, and the Earl of Ellesmere. The stained glass in the chancel windows was donated by Sir Richard Brooke. A clock was installed in the tower in 1851, and three new lancet windows were added to the chancel in 1900. In 1910 a papal bull issued by Pope Boniface IX was found in the churchyard that referred to the dissolution of Norton Priory.

== Architecture ==
=== Exterior ===
The church is built of Runcorn sandstone with a slate roof, and is in Early English style. Its plan consists of a nave of five bays with north and south aisles and a clerestory, a chancel that is lower and narrower than the nave, and a steeple at the southwest corner. The steeple consists of a square tower with an octagonal spire rising to 161 feet (49 m). The steeple has corner buttresses, large louvred lancets at the bell-stage, and two tiers of lucarnes springing from the base of the tower and from the broach. At the corners of the nave and the chancel are buttresses that rise up as spirelets. On the gables of the chancel and the nave are cross finials and pinnacles. There is an organ chamber at the east end of the north aisle, and a war memorial chapel at the east end of the south aisle. The windows along the clerestory are round with inset quatrefoils; all the other windows are lancets.

=== Interior ===
The five-bay arcades are carried on square columns with angled corners and have foliated capitals. The chancel is paved with Minton encaustic tiles. The marble reredos dates from 1888, and the alabaster altar rails from 1900; both were donated by the daughter of Rev John Barclay, a former vicar of the church who died in 1866. Mural tablets, some of which were moved from the old church, commemorate members of the Brooke family and previous vicars of the parish. Also brought from the old church was "a curiously designed table said to have been used as a communion table", two sanctuary chairs (one in Jacobean style), and a chest. In addition, a royal coat of arms of George III, and a benefaction board dating from about 1700 were moved from the old church. The oldest memorial is to two women described as "both good wives" who died in 1672. The next in age is a large tablet to the memory of Thomas Brooke, who died in 1737. Two memorials are by John Bacon; one to Sir Richard Brooke (died 1792) features a putto unveiling an urn and the second, to another Sir Richard Brooke (died 1796), shows a female figure by an urn. The memorial to Thomas Brooke (died 1820) is by B. F. Hardenburg of London. A memorial to another Sir Richard Brooke (died 1865) is a brass in the form of a cross. In the nave are a number of Georgian tablets including one to John Bankes (died 1817), by T. Grindrod. The Rev John Barclay has a memorial by Williams and Clay of Warrington containing his portrait in relief. The stained glass in the chancel includes two windows with depictions of the Annunciation and the Resurrection. In the south aisle is a memorial to J. R. Hughes, who died at sea in 1874; "he is shown in the water wearing nothing but mutton-chop whiskers and a crown proffered by an angel". There is a ring of eight bells cast in 1851 by Charles and George Mears, the tenor weighing 15-3-15 in cwts-qtrs-lbs or around 800 kg, having a diameter of 39 inches (0.99 m) and tuned to the note E.

== External features ==
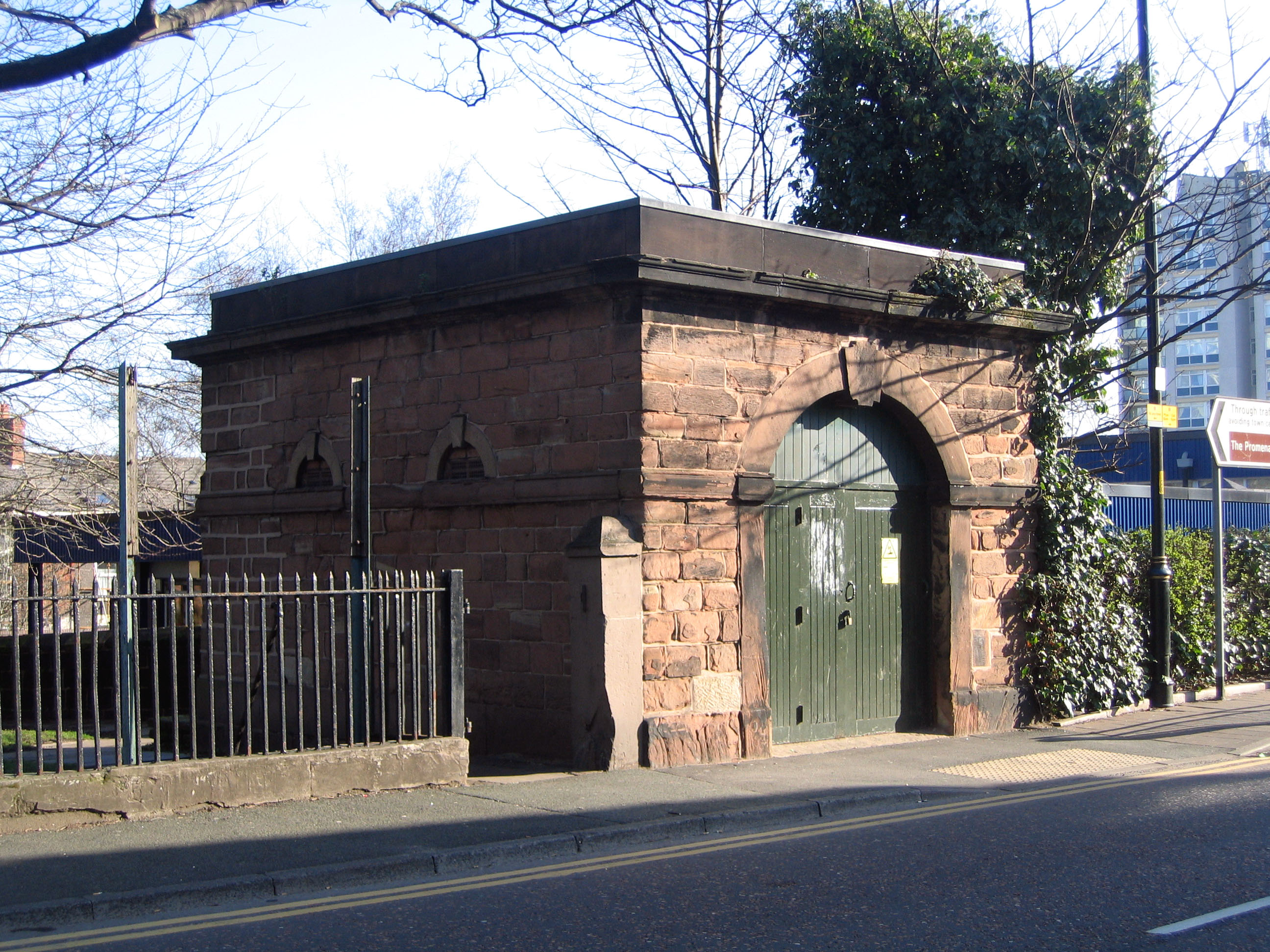
Former hearse house

A former hearse house at the southeast corner of the churchyard dates from about 1833, and has been converted for use as an electricity sub-station. It is a rectangular single-story building of red sandstone with a quarry tile roof. The door opening at the front has a wide semicircular arch with a keystone and springing blocks, above which is a string course and a cornice with moulded eaves. On the west side and at the rear are small vents with semicircular heads and keystones. The hearse house is listed at Grade II.

== Appraisal ==
All Saints' Church is recorded in the National Heritage List for England as a Grade II* listed building, having been designated on 7 December 1965. Grade II* is the middle of the three grades of listing, and is applied to "particularly important buildings of more than special interest". Hartwell et al. in the Buildings of England series comment that the church is "more generous and rounded than many of Salvin's other later churches", and refer specifically to its "high, graceful" steeple.

== Present day ==
The church is an active parish church in the diocese of Chester, the archdeaconry of Chester, and the deanery of Frodsham. Its benefice is combined with that of Holy Trinity, Runcorn to form the benefice of Runcorn All Saints with Holy Trinity. The historic patron of the church is Christ Church, Oxford. All Saints conducts services on alternate Sundays, together with baptisms, thanksgivings, weddings and funerals.

== See also ==
- Grade I and II* listed buildings in Halton (borough)
- Listed buildings in Runcorn (urban area)
- List of new churches by Anthony Salvin
