= Rocksavage Power Station =

Gas-fired power station

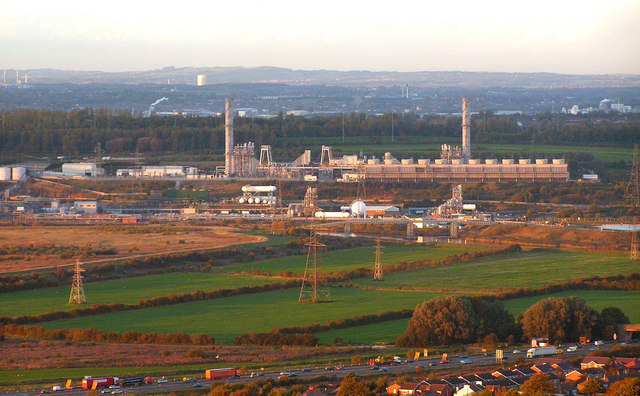
- Rocksavage Power Station in 2006
- Country: England
- Location: Cheshire, North West England
- Coordinates: 53.31544°N 2.72541°W
- Commission date: 1998; 28 years ago
- Operator: Intergen

Thermal power station
- Primary fuel: Natural gas

External links
- Commons: Related media on Commons

Rocksavage Power Station is an 800 MWe gas-fired power station in Runcorn, off the A557, at the junction of the River Weaver and River Mersey, and near junction 12 of the M56.

== History ==
It was opened by Queen Elizabeth II and the Duke of Edinburgh on 31 July 1998, meeting Carlos Riva.It was owned by InterGen, a company that is now owned by Sev.en Global Investments. It cost £375m. The EPC contractor was Bechtel.

The site trades as Rocksavage Power Company Ltd. It sponsors the Runcorn Jets baseball club, the Highfield Male Voice Choir, and the Weston Angling Club. The site has a visitor centre for schoolchildren. The name comes from the nearby ruined Elizabethan mansion, Rocksavage.

== Specification ==
It is a CCGT-type power station that uses natural gas. It has two Alstom 260MWe GT26A gas turbines, with an Alstom heat recovery steam generator each that produces steam for one ABB 280MWe steam turbine. The plant runs at 58% thermal efficiency. 300MWe is used by the Ineos site (previously ICI) at Weston Point that makes hydrofluororcarbons (HFCs), and the other 400MWe is sold by Scottish and Southern Energy (formerly Scottish Hydro) for electricity supply.
