= Moore, Cheshire =

Village in Cheshire, England

Coordinates: 53.354°N 2.633°W

Moore
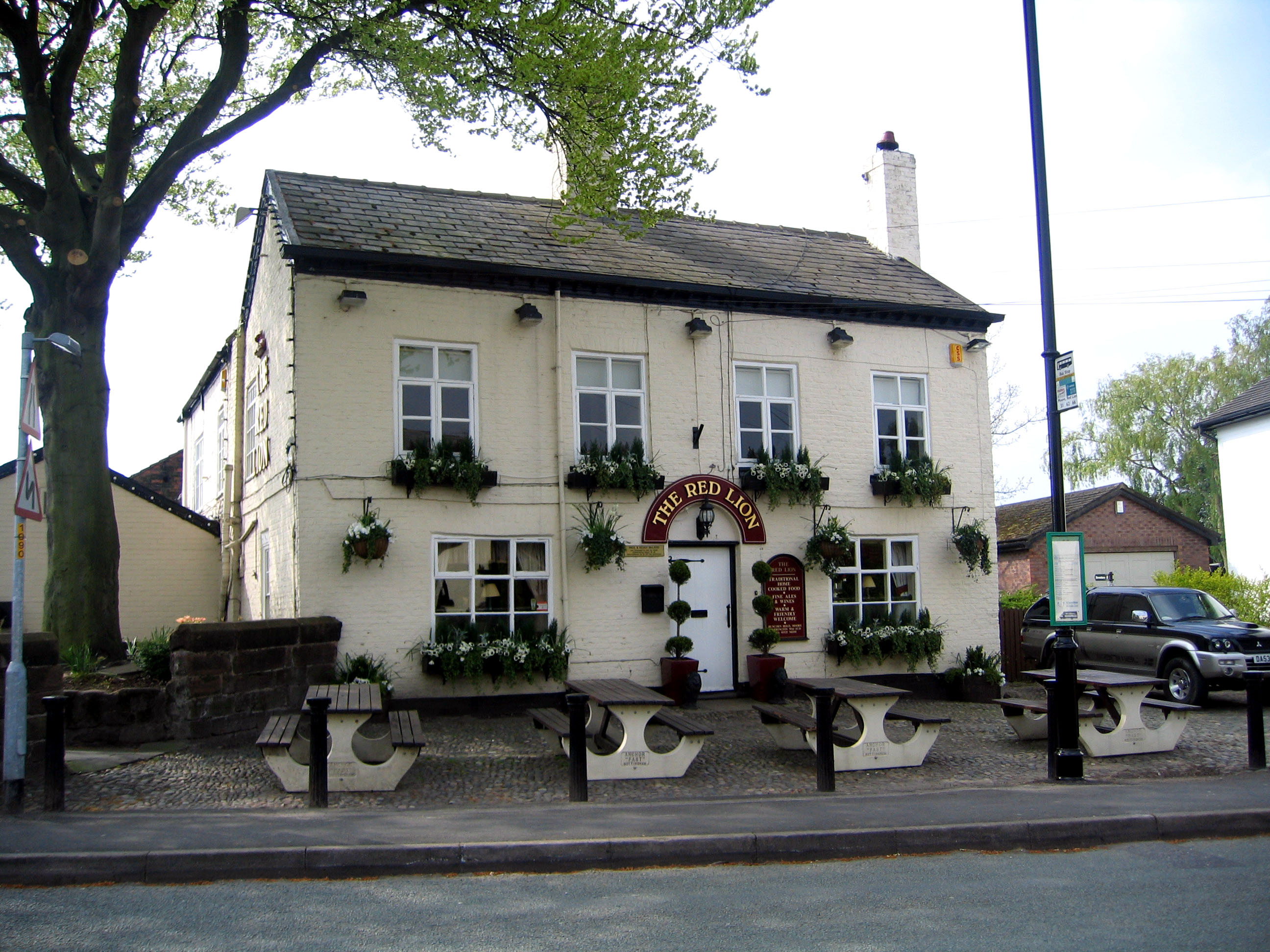
- Red Lion public house, Moore

- Location within Cheshire
- Population: 768 (2011)
- OS grid reference: SJ578843
- Civil parish: Moore
- Unitary authority: Halton
- Ceremonial county: Cheshire
- Region: North West
- Country: England
- Sovereign state: United Kingdom
- Post town: WARRINGTON
- Postcode district: WA4
- Dialling code: 01925
- Police: Cheshire
- Fire: Cheshire
- Ambulance: North West
- UK Parliament: Runcorn and Helsby

Moore is a village and civil parish in the Borough of Halton, Cheshire, England, located midway between Runcorn and Warrington. At the 2011 census, it had a population of 768.

== Toponymy ==
The name 'Moore' comes from the Old English word mor, meaning 'moor, or fen'. The village's earliest recording was as Mora, some time in the 12th century.

== History ==
Moore is the site of a disused railway station named Daresbury. The railway station was opened in 1850 and was located on the south side of Runcorn Road. The station was closed to passengers in 1952 and closed completely in 1965. The platforms and ramps down from the road are still visible from Runcorn Road. The railway station was situated on the Birkenhead Joint Railway close to Warrington and in the village of Moore. The railway station was the second to open in the village. The first railway station which was very close by was part of the Grand Junction Railway which opened on 4 July 1837. Moore was a second class station at which a First Class train would not stop. The engineer for the northern half of the new railway was Joseph Locke, who became famous as a railway engineer. The date of closure of Moore railway station is uncertain. Daresbury railway station was initially called Moore but the name was changed to Daresbury in April 1861 taking its name from a village a mile or so away.

The area of Moore to the north of the West Coast Main Line and west of Moss Lane was designated as part of Runcorn New Town in 1964 and the land allocated to industry. The New Town Masterplan was amended in 1975 to reduce the amount of industrial land around the village and to create a green buffer between it and what would become Manor Park Industrial Estate.

== Economy ==
In 2020, the GVA for the Moore Built-up Area Sub-division was £142.7 million.

== Landmarks ==
Moore's notable buildings are the village farmhouse, dating from the middle of the 17th century and Moore Hall, a five-bay manor house, dating from the early 18th century.

== See also ==
- Listed buildings in Runcorn (rural area)
