= Borough of Halton =

Unitary authority area in Cheshire, England

- Borough and unitary authority
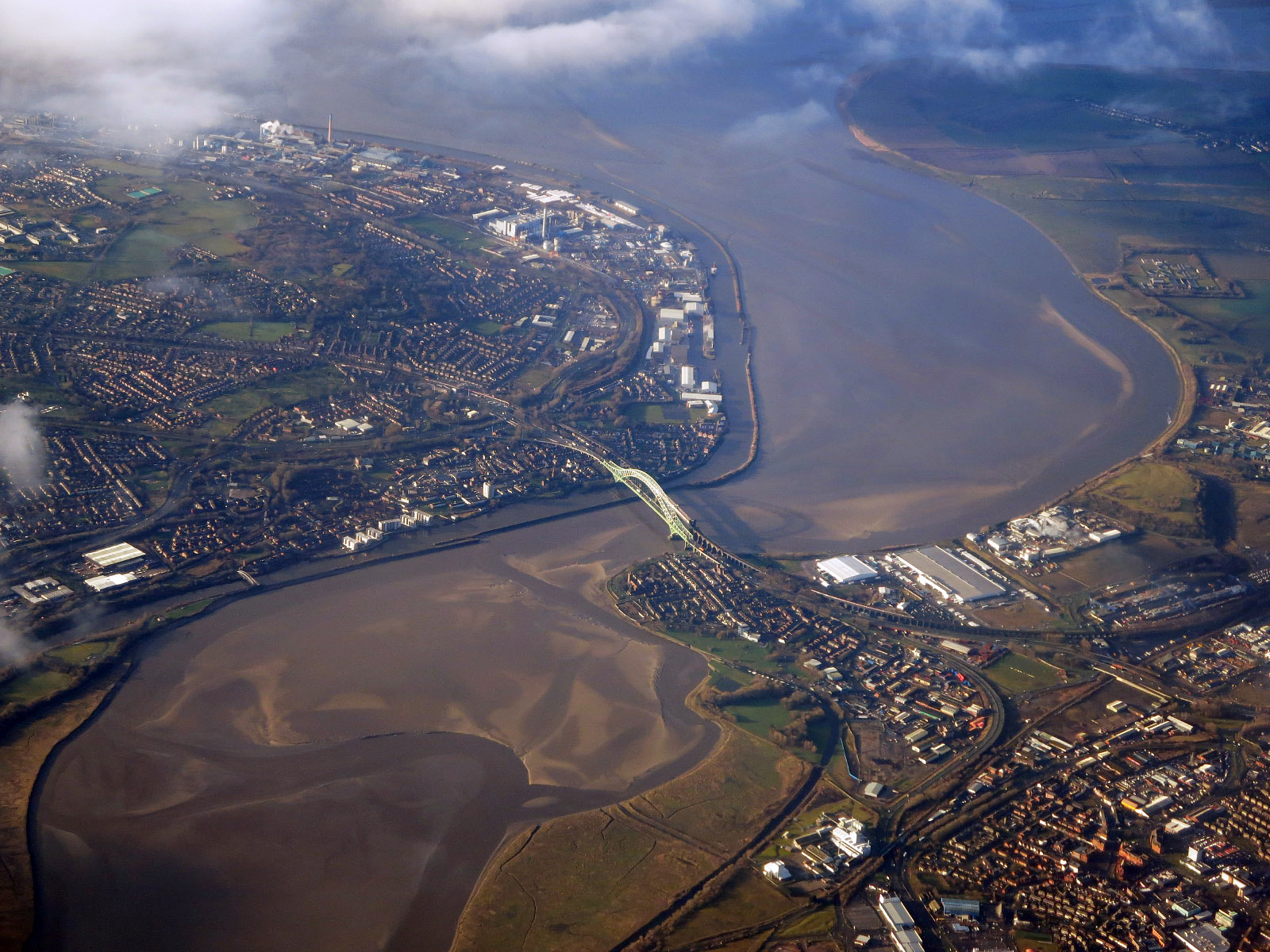
- Aerial view of the Silver Jubilee Bridge and the two towns of Runcorn (left) and Widnes (right)

- Coat of arms
- Motto: Latin: Industria Navem Implet, lit. 'Industry Fills the Ship'
- Halton shown within Cheshire
- Coordinates: 53°20′42″N 02°44′19″W
- Sovereign state: United Kingdom
- Country: England
- Region: North West
- Ceremonial county: Cheshire
- Combined authority: Liverpool City Region
- Incorporated: 1 April 1974
- Unitary authority: 1 April 1998
- Named for: Barony of Halton
- Administrative HQ: Municipal Building, Widnes

Government
  - Type: Unitary authority
  - Body: Halton Borough Council
  - Control: Labour
  - MPs: Sarah Pochin (Ref); Derek Twigg (Lab)

Area
  - Total: 35 sq mi (90 km^{2})
  - Land: 31 sq mi (79 km^{2})
  - Rank: 217th

Population (2025)
  - Total: 131,912
  - Rank: 185th
  - Density: 4,320/sq mi (1,668/km^{2})

Ethnicity (2021)
  - Ethnic groups: List: 96.5% White; 1.4% Mixed; 1.1% Asian; 0.6% other; 0.4% Black

Religion (2021)
  - Religion: List: 58.6% Christianity; 35.2% no religion; 0.6% Islam; 0.3% Hinduism; 0.2% Buddhism; 0.1% Sikhism; 0.0% Judaism; 0.4% other; 4.6% not stated
- Time zone: UTC+00:00 (GMT)
  - Summer (DST): UTC+01:00 (BST)
- Postcode areas: L24; WA4; WA7; WA8
- Dialling codes: 0151; 01925; 01928
- ISO 3166 code: GB-HAL
- GSS code: E06000006
- Website: www.halton.gov.uk

The Borough of Halton (/hɒltən/) is a local authority district with borough status in the ceremonial county of Cheshire, North West England. It is administered by Halton Borough Council, a unitary authority since 1998. The borough contains the towns of Runcorn and Widnes and the civil parishes of Daresbury, Hale, Halebank, Moore, Preston Brook, and Sandymoor. Since 2014, it has been part of the Liverpool City Region and the council is a member of the Liverpool City Region Combined Authority.

The neighbouring districts (clockwise from west) are Liverpool, Knowsley and St Helens, which are fellow boroughs of the Liverpool City Region, and Warrington and Cheshire West and Chester in Cheshire.

== History ==
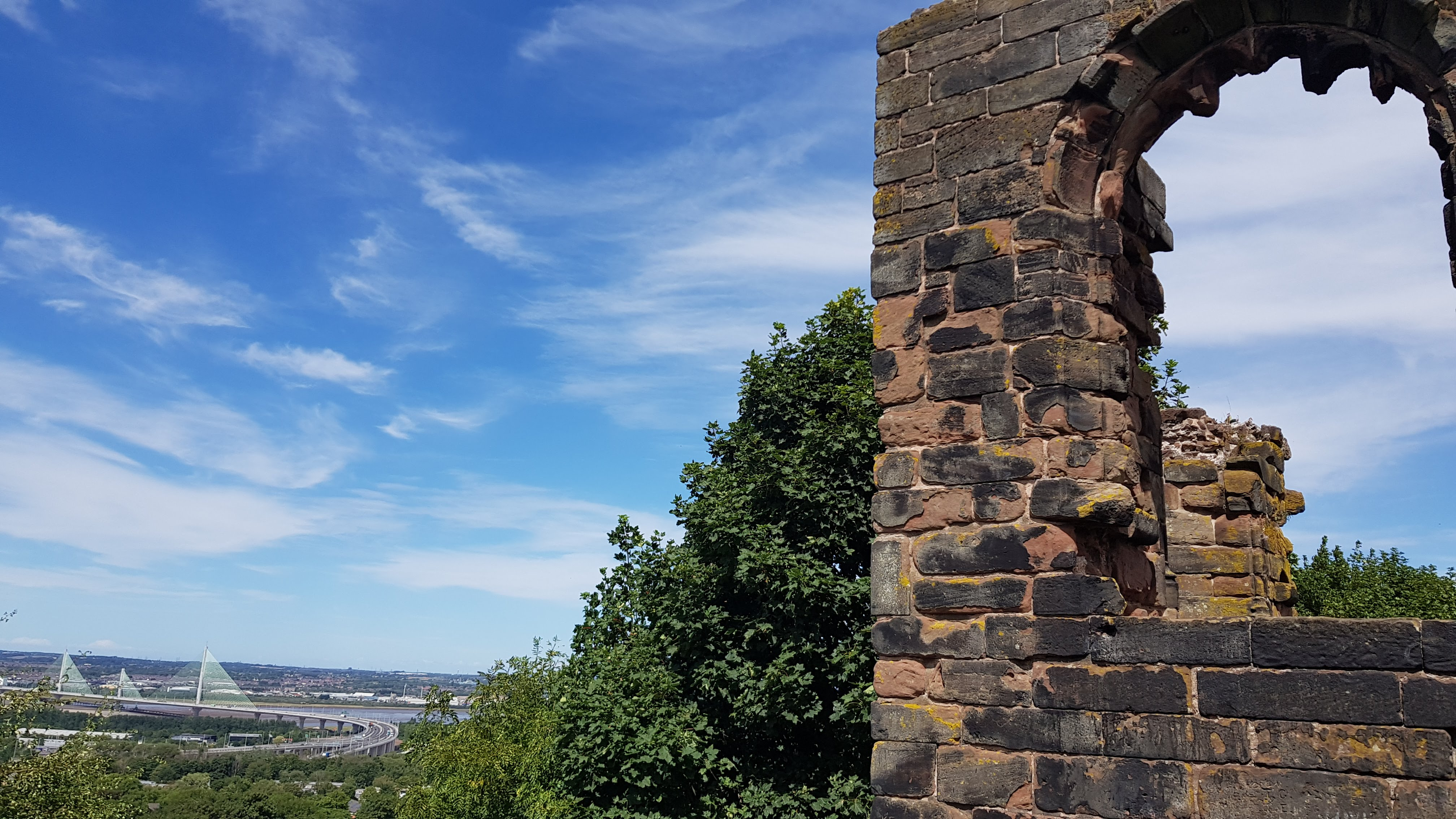
Halton Castle overlooking the Mersey Gateway Bridge

The River Mersey marks the boundary of the historic counties of Lancashire (to the north) and Cheshire (to the south). Before 1974, Widnes was administered by the Municipal Borough of Widnes in Lancashire, and Runcorn by Runcorn Urban District Council in Cheshire.

The 1969 Redcliffe-Maud Report recommended reforms to local government in England, including the abolition of all existing local government areas. They were to be replaced by mostly unitary authorities with the exception of three two-tier metropolitan areas to be called Merseyside, SELNEC (an acronym of South East Lancashire & North East Cheshire), and West Midlands. Runcorn and Widnes would form part of the new Merseyside Metropolitan Area under a district called 'St Helens-Widnes'.

The proposals were broadly accepted by the then Labour government but set aside by the incoming Conservative government following the 1970 general election which it had fought on a manifesto pledge to introduce a system of two-tier local government. The Local Government Act 1972 created new metropolitan counties around Liverpool (as Merseyside) and Manchester (as Greater Manchester) but Runcorn and Widnes would not be allocated to either. Instead, Widnes and Warrington would be moved into the non-metropolitan county of Cheshire, with Widnes joining Runcorn to create the new non-metropolitan district of Halton. The name of the new district was inspired by the ancient Barony of Halton which had possessed land on both sides of the river. The district was established on 1 April 1974. In addition to Runcorn Urban District and the Municipal Borough of Widnes, parts of Runcorn Rural District and the parish of Hale from Whiston Rural District were incorporated into Halton.

On 1 April 1998, Halton became a unitary authority, independent of Cheshire County Council. However, it continues to be served by Cheshire Police and Cheshire Fire and Rescue Service, and forms part of Cheshire for ceremonial purposes. On 1 April 2014, Halton became part of the Liverpool City Region Combined Authority, joining the local authorities of Liverpool, Sefton, Wirral, Knowsley and St Helens; the five metropolitan district councils which constitute the county of Merseyside. As a unitary authority, Halton's status is similar to the metropolitan district councils.

== Demographics ==
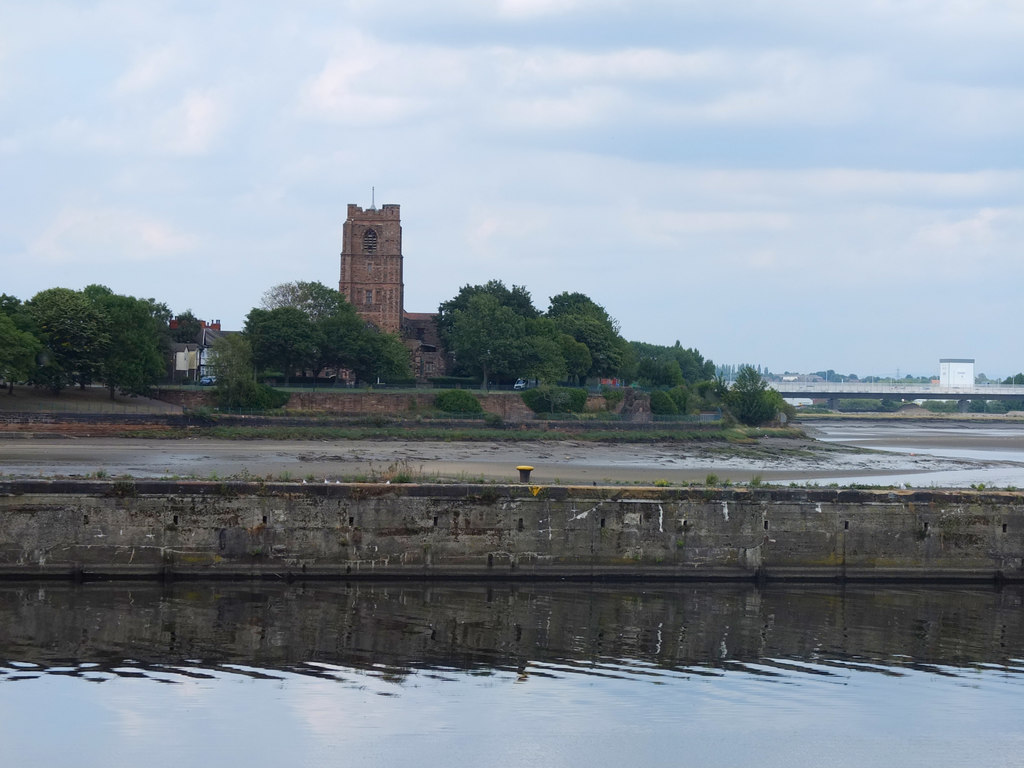
St Mary's Church, Widnes, viewed across the River Mersey

=== Population growth ===
The population of Halton is 131,912 (2025). Although the borough was only created in 1974, the change in population since 1801 has been calculated by adapting historical census data to modern boundaries.

Population growth in the Borough of Halton since 1801
Year	Population	Change as %
1801	6,460	—
1811	7,491	+16.0%
1821	8,962	+19.6%
1831	10,918	+21.8%
1841	13,364	+22.4%
1851	16,296	+21.9%
1861	17,678	+8.5%
1871	—	—
1881	46,181	—
1891	58,042	+25.7%
1901	—	—
1911	56,656	—
1921	61,977	+9.4%
1931	64,979	+4.8%
1941	—	—
1951	80,072	—
1961	82,119	+2.6%
1971	99,749	+21.5%
1981	129,187	+29.5%
1991	128,525	−0.5%
2001	118,242	−8.0%
2011	125,746	+6.3%
2021	128,478	+2.2%

=== Religion ===
In the 2021 census, Christianity was the main religion in Halton at 58.6%, above the national average for England of 46.3% but down from 75% in 2011. 35.2% stated that they had 'no religion'. Those stating their religion as Buddhist, Hindu, Jewish, Muslim, Sikh or other amounted to 1.6%.

=== Ethnicity ===
In the 2021 census, 96.5% of Halton residents identified as White and 3.5% as non-White or mixed. 95.2% were born in the United Kingdom.

== Governance ==
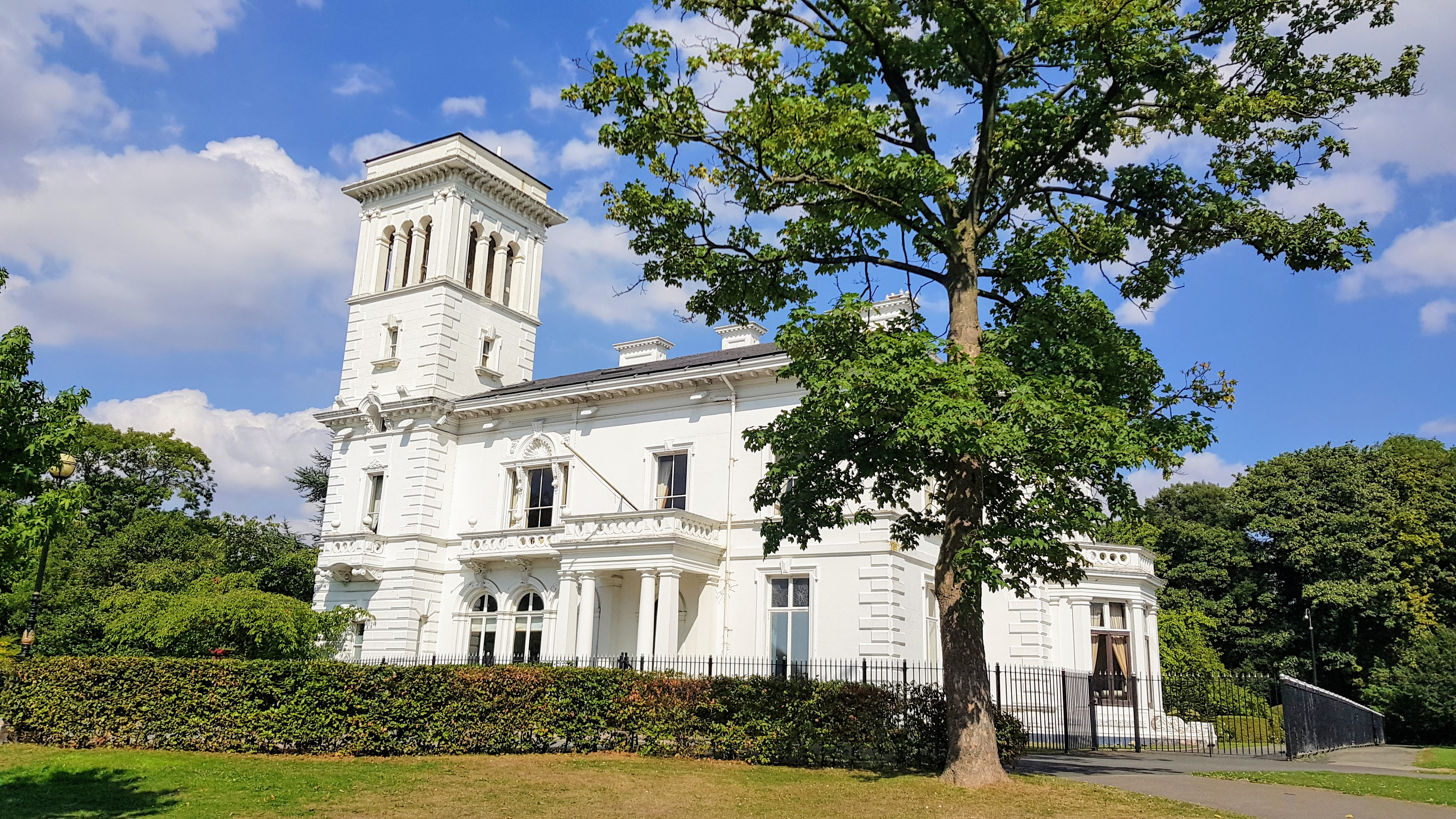
Runcorn Town Hall

Halton Borough Council is a unitary authority responsible for most local government functions within the area. The Labour Party has controlled the council since it was created in 1974.

On 1 April 2014, Halton became one of the six constituent local government districts of the Liverpool City Region governed by the Combined Authority.

Since the 2024 general election, the borough has been split into the two constituencies of Widnes and Halewood and Runcorn and Helsby; the former has been held by Derek Twigg of the Labour Party since the election, whilst the latter is a marginal seat represented by Sarah Pochin of Reform UK since the 2025 by-election, which she won by six votes in the closest by-election result in British history.

== Economy ==
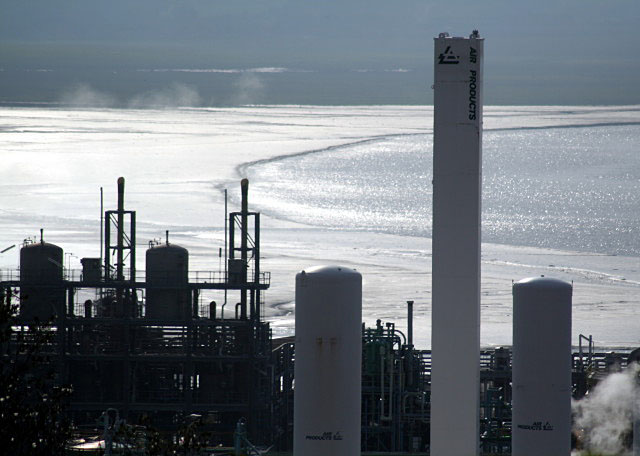
Chemical works at Weston Point

In 2021, the borough's total GVA was £4.0 billion with a total GDP of £4.5 billion. GVA per capita in Halton was £31,390 and GDP per capita was £34,985, the highest in the Liverpool City Region.

In 2022, there were 67,000 jobs in Halton, including the self-employed. The borough is an industrial, scientific and logistics hub with a higher proportion of jobs in these industries, and proportionally fewer jobs in hospitality and education compared to Great Britain. Proportionally more jobs were full-time roles.

In the period October 2022 to September 2023, the employment rate in Halton was 76.6%, higher than the average rate for Great Britain of 75.8%. Unemployment was 2.9% compared to 3.7% for Great Britain.

However, people in Halton are qualified to a lower level than the average for the North West or Great Britain. In 2023, the gross median weekly wage for full time workers living in Halton was £664. Although higher than the regional median of £649, it is lower than the £682.60 for Great Britain.

== Media ==
Local television content is provided by BBC North West and ITV Granada

Local radio stations include:

- BBC Radio Merseyside
- Heart North West
- Smooth North West
- Capital North West & Wales
- Greatest Hits Radio Liverpool & The North West (formerly Wire FM)
- Hits Radio Liverpool
- Dee Radio
- Halton Community Radio, a community based station, inactive since 2025

Local newspapers are The Runcorn & Widnes Weekly News, and the Runcorn and Widnes World.

== Twin boroughs ==
Halton is twinned with:

- Marzahn-Hellersdorf, Berlin, Germany (since 25 May 1993)
- Ústí nad Labem, Ústí nad Labem Region, Czech Republic (since 13 October 1993)
- Leiria, Central Region, Portugal (since 1997)
- Tongling, Anhui, China (since 1997)

Following an appeal in 1997, Halton residents donated 1,000 English books to Jan Evangelista Purkyně University in Ústí nad Labem. In 1999, an historic Halton Transport bus was restored and gifted to the Czech Republic to mark the centenary of public transport in the city. Engineers from Halton have assisted with chemical decontamination in the city and also when the city flooded in 2002.

The first crazy golf course in Berlin, created in Marzahn-Hellersdorf in 2005, contains several Halton landmarks and was constructed with the assistance of exchange students from the borough.

Several roads are named after Halton's twin boroughs, including Leiria Way in Runcorn and Marzahn Way in Widnes. A Chinese friendship garden was created in the grounds of Runcorn Town Hall in 2006, including a bronze statue gifted by the twin city of Tongling.

== See also ==
- List of schools in Halton
- Listed buildings in Daresbury, Cheshire
- Listed buildings in Hale, Halton
- Listed buildings in Moore, Cheshire
- Listed buildings in Preston Brook, Cheshire
- Listed buildings in Runcorn, Cheshire
- Listed buildings in Widnes, Cheshire
