= Grade I and II* listed buildings in Halton (borough) =

There are over 9,000 Grade I listed buildings and 20,000 Grade II* listed buildings in England. This page is a list of these buildings in the borough of Halton in Cheshire.

== Grade I ==
Name	Location	Type	Completed (Note: The date given is the date used by Historic England as significant for the initial building or that of an important part in the structure's description.)	Date designated	Grid ref. (Note: Sometimes known as OSGB36, the grid reference is based on the British national grid reference system used by the Ordnance Survey.) Geo-coordinates	Notes	Entry number (Note: The "List Entry Number" is a unique number assigned to each listed building and scheduled monument by Historic England.)	Image
Halton Castle	Halton	Castle	1070 and later	23 April 1970	SJ5375182056; 53°20′00″N 2°41′45″W	Built after the Norman Conquest, the castle became the seat of the Barons of Halton. It was besieged twice during the English Civil War and subsequently fell into ruin. In about 1800, additional walls were built on its east side to improve its appearance from Norton Priory. It is a scheduled monument, owned by the Duchy of Lancaster and managed by the Norton Priory Museum Trust.	1130460	Halton Castle More images
Norton Priory	Halton	Priory	1115 and later	23 April 1970	SJ5483183045; 53°20′33″N 2°40′47″W	This former Augustinian Priory, later an abbey, was reduced to a ruin following the dissolution of the monasteries. A Tudor mansion house was built on the site by Richard Brooke; this was replaced by a Georgian house in 1730. The latter house was demolished in 1928. The site is now a museum which consists of the remains of the priory, including a Norman undercroft with a doorway of 1180 and a Victorian copy, and two blind Norman arcades. It is a scheduled monument and is managed by the Norton Priory Museum Trust.	1130433	Norton Priory More images

== Grade II* ==
Name	Location	Type	Completed	Date designated	Grid ref. Geo-coordinates	Notes	Entry number	Image
All Saints' Church	Daresbury, Halton	Parish Church	16th century and 1871	8 January 1970	SJ5807082812; 53°20′26″N 2°37′52″W	The parish church of Daresbury was rebuilt in 1871, and retains its 16th-century tower. It is built in red sandstone with a slate roof. Lewis Carroll was born in the vicarage; a stained-glass window in the church depicts characters from his books.	1130450	All Saints' Church More images
Daresbury Hall	Daresbury, Halton	Country House	1759	20 October 1952	SJ5845182526; 53°20′17″N 2°37′33″W	This former mansion house is built in brown brick with a slate roof in three storeys and three bays. It incorporates a stone plinth and floor bands, rusticated giant pilasters and matching stone quoins.	1330337	Daresbury Hall More images
Manor House	Hale, Halton	House	Mid 17th century	28 May 1958	SJ4709682182; 53°20′02″N 2°47′45″W	The house was originally built as a parsonage.	1330339	Manor House More images
Moore Hall	Moore, Halton	Country House	Early 18th century	8 January 1970	SJ5804784267; 53°21′15″N 2°37′52″W	Built in rendered brick with a slate roof, this former mansion house has five bays and three storeys, rusticated quoins and a cornice at the second-floor level.	1330357	Moore Hall More images
All Saints Church	Runcorn Town Centre	Parish Church	1849	7 December 1965	SJ5106383213; 53°20′37″N 2°44′12″W	Built on the site of an earlier medieval church, the parish church of Runcorn was designed in Early English style by Anthony Salvin. It consists of a five-bay nave with aisles, a chancel which is reduced in both width and height, and a tower with a spire at the southwest corner of the nave.	1104888	All Saints Church More images
St Luke's Church, Farnworth	Farnworth, Halton	Parish Church	12th century with later additions	30 May 1963	SJ5170687751; 53°23′04″N 2°43′38″W	St Luke's is a parish church constructed in red sandstone dating from the late 12th century. Its tower was added in the 14th century. There were later additions and restorations, the final restoration being in 1894–95. The plan consists of a west tower, a five-bay nave with north and south aisles, a chancel, and north and south porches. At the east end of the north aisle is the Bold Chapel, which contains many family monuments, and the transept is known as the Cuerdley Chapel.	1130417	St Luke's Church, Farnworth More images
St Mary's Church, West Bank	West Bank, Halton	Parish Church	1908–10	31 October 1983	SJ5130783790; 53°20′56″N 2°43′58″W	St Mary's parish church was built to replace an earlier church nearby which had been damaged by subsidence, It is constructed in red sandstone in Perpendicular style. It has a nave, aisles, transepts, chancel and a tower at the west end.	1130420	St Mary's Church, West Bank More images
St Michael's Church, Ditton	Ditton, Halton	Roman Catholic Church	1876–79	31 October 1983	SJ4944885334; 53°21′45″N 2°45′40″W	St Michael's is a Catholic church built for a Jesuit community who had been expelled from Germany in 1872. It is constructed in red sandstone ashlar and has a cruciform plan. At the west end is a tall tower with a saddleback roof.	1325926	St Michael's Church, Ditton More images
Former power house of the Widnes-Runcorn transporter bridge	Victoria Promenade, Halton	Electricity Sub Station	1901	31 October 1983	SJ5110783706; 53°20′52″N 2°44′09″W	This is a small red sandstone rectangular building in three storeys which originally contained the power house to drive the transporter bridge. It is now used as an electrical sub-station.	1130419	Former power house of the Widnes-Runcorn transporter bridge More images
St John's Church	Weston, Halton	Parish Church	1897	5 April 1990	SJ5088180490; 53°19′08″N 2°44′20″W	St John's Church has a short broach spire, a nave, and a chancel at a higher level, with the vestry below. It was designed by John Douglas. Some of the money for its construction was raised by the choirboys, who wrote appeal letters; it is therefore sometimes known as "the choirboys' church". St John's became a separate parish in 1931.	1130422	St John's Church More images
Runcorn Railway Bridge	Runcorn Bridge, Halton	Railway Bridge	1864–68	6 October 1983	SJ5089483431; 53°20′48″N 2°44′18″W	Spanning the River Mersey to provide a more direct rail connection between London and Liverpool, the bridge is constructed of three wrought iron girders carried on four sandstone piers. It is approached on each side by viaducts. The structure was designed by William Baker and now carries the Liverpool branch of the West Coast Main Line.	1130418	Runcorn Railway Bridge More images
Castle Hotel	Halton	Hotel	1737	20 October 1952	SJ5376382016; 53°19′59″N 2°41′45″W	This building was originally integrated into the walls of the castle and used as a court house. The court room was on the first floor and prisoners were housed in the cellars. The entrance to the court room is approached by an external stone staircase, and its doorcase is surmounted by the Royal Arms. It is now a public house.	1115543	Castle Hotel More images
Halton Old Hall	Halton Common, Halton	House	1693	4 March 1969	SJ5392681925; 53°19′56″N 2°41′36″W	This is a house which was rebuilt after having been damaged in the English Civil War. A two-storey wing was later added to the north. The house has mullion windows and a studded door.	1130461	Halton Old Hall More images
Chesshyre Library	Halton	Library	1730	20 October 1952	SJ5377681887; 53°19′55″N 2°41′44″W	The library was built for the incumbent of St Mary's Church by Sir John Chesshyre. Its doorcase is surrounded by Ionic columns with a triangular pediment. The roof has a cornice, a solid parapet, stone gables, and a chimney. Since 1975, it has been linked to the church hall and used as a meeting room.	1115560	Chesshyre Library More images
Seneschal's House	Halton	House	1598	20 October 1952	SJ5376682237; 53°20′06″N 2°41′45″W	This is the oldest standing building in Runcorn. It was latterly a farmhouse although was originally built by the judge John King, called to the bar in London in the late 16th century and was originally known as "John King's New House"; the occupation of the original owner of the house, led to a later owner, Geoffrey Barraclough, Professor of History at Liverpool University in the mid 20th century coining the current name of the house. The house was, in fact, inhabited originally by a seneschal, that is the original owner, John King. The house is E-shaped and its gables have corbels, moulded copings and sandstone ridges.	1330346	Seneschal's House More images
Tricorn Public House, formerly Hallwood	Palacefields	Country House	c. 1710	23 April 1970	SJ5405880792; 53°19′19″N 2°41′28″W	Now a public house, this was formerly a wing of a mansion house called Hallwood, the birthplace and home of Sir John Chesshyre. It is in brown brick and stone with a slate roof.	1130425	Tricorn Public House, formerly Hallwood More images
Halton Vicarage	Halton	Vicarage	1739	20 October 1952	SJ5377781918; 53°19′55″N 2°41′44″W	The vicarage was paid for by Sir John Chesshyre. On its front are pilasters and a Doric porch. The windows are sash windows. The eaves consist of a cornice with a solid parapet, which is pedimented over the centre bay. It is still in use as a vicarage.	1320399	Halton Vicarage More images

== See also ==
- Grade I listed buildings in Cheshire
- Grade II* listed buildings in Cheshire
