= Halton Vicarage =

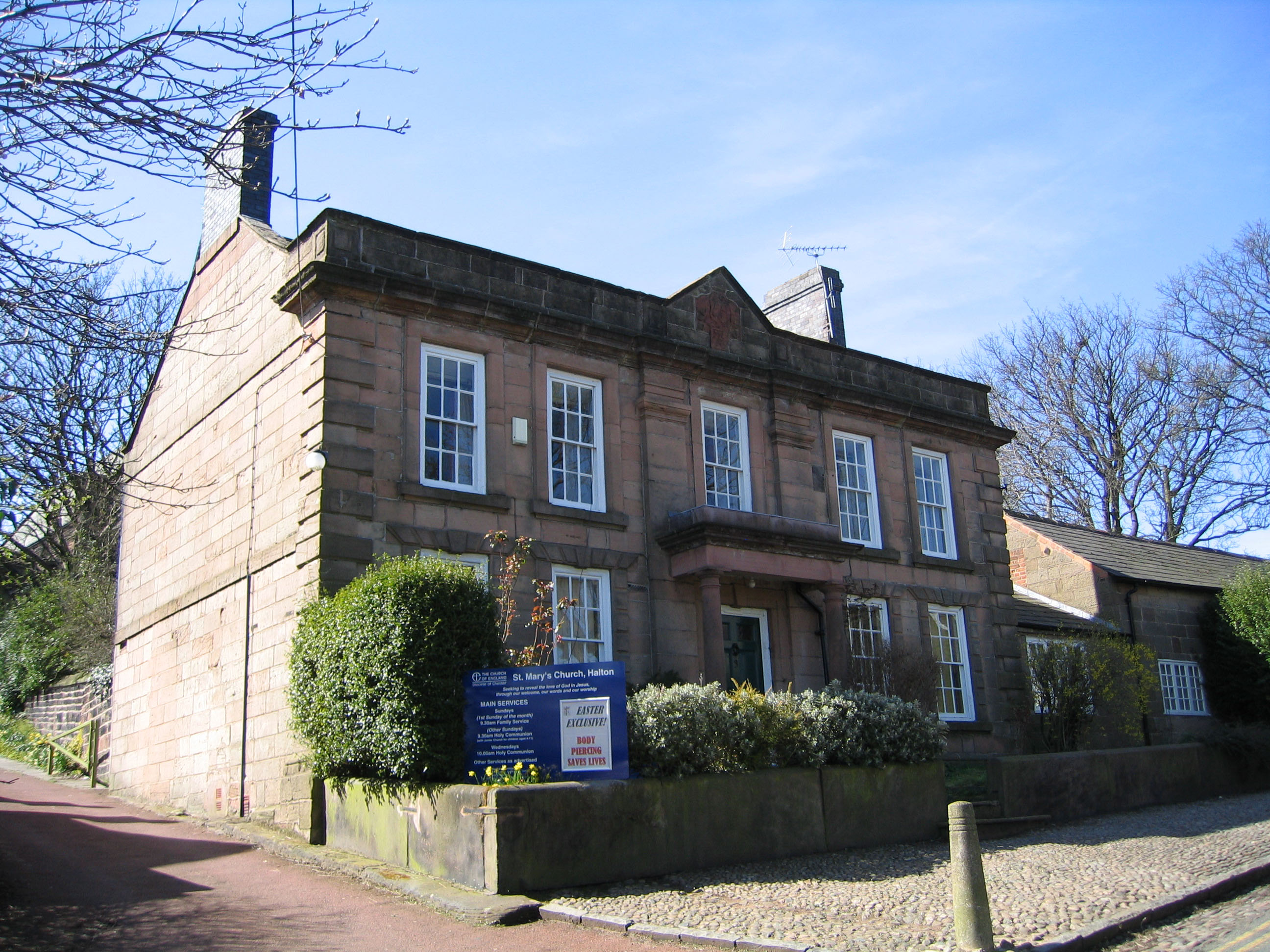
- Halton Vicarage

- Location in Cheshire
- 53.3320°N 2.6956°W
- OS grid reference: SJ 539 819

History
- Built: 1739; 287 years ago

Listed Building – Grade II*
- Designated: 20 October 1952
- Reference no.: 1320399

Halton Vicarage is in Castle Road, Halton in the town of Runcorn, Cheshire, England. It is recorded in the National Heritage List for England as a designated Grade II* listed building.

The vicarage was built in 1739 by Sir John Chesshyre for the incumbent of St Mary's Church. It is built in sandstone with a slate roof and has rusticated quoins. It has five bays, the central of which is flanked by giant pilasters. The porch is supported by Doric columns. The eaves cornice has a solid parapet with a pedimented centre. Over the door are Sir John's coat of arms.

== See also ==
- Grade I and II* listed buildings in Halton (borough)
- Listed buildings in Runcorn (urban area)
