= Chesshyre (disambiguation) =

Hubert Chesshyre (1940–2020) was a British officer of arms.

Chesshyre may also refer to:

- Sir John Chesshyre (1662–1738), English lawyer and serjeant-at-law
- Chesshyre Library, free public library in Runcorn, Cheshire

== See also ==
Cheshire, ceremonial county of England
