= Listed buildings in Runcorn (urban area) =

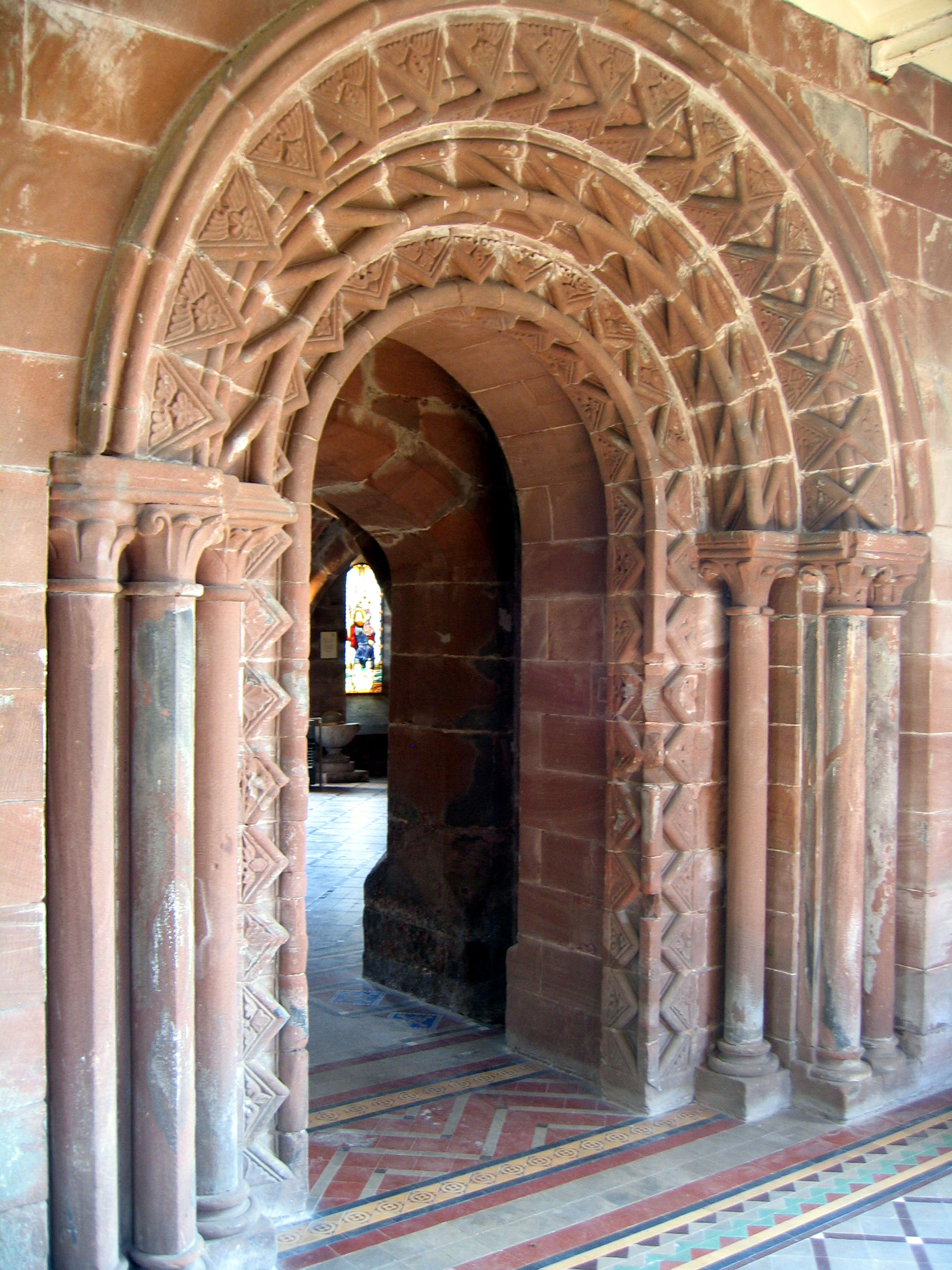
Norman doorway in the undercroft of Norton Priory, built in local red sandstone

Runcorn is an industrial town in Halton, Cheshire, England, on the south bank of the River Mersey where it narrows at Runcorn Gap. In the town are the 61 buildings that are recorded in the National Heritage List for England as designated listed buildings in the current urban area of Runcorn, including the districts of Runcorn, Halton, Weston, Weston Point, and Norton. Two of these are classified as being in Grade I, nine in Grade II*, and 51 in Grade II.

In the United Kingdom, the term "listed building" refers to a building or other structure officially designated as being of special architectural, historical or cultural significance. These buildings are in three grades: Grade I consists of buildings of outstanding architectural or historical interest; Grade II* includes particularly significant buildings of more than local interest; Grade II consists of buildings of special architectural or historical interest. Buildings in England are listed by the Secretary of State for Culture, Media and Sport on recommendations provided by English Heritage, which also determines the grading.

Before the Industrial Revolution, the area contained the separate settlements of Runcorn, Higher Runcorn, Halton, Weston, Weston Point, and Norton. The administrative functions of the area were initially concentrated in Halton, which contained a castle and a court, while the parish church was in Runcorn. The population increase associated with industrialisation resulted in considerable expansion, so that the formerly discrete settlements were absorbed into the current urban area, much of which dates from the 19th and 20th centuries. The listed buildings are concentrated in Halton Village, which has 20, and Runcorn Town Centre, which has 16.

The listed buildings can be divided by date into three groups: ancient structures, structures built during the two centuries before the Industrial Revolution, and those built during or after it.

Halton Castle and Norton Priory date from the 11th and 12th centuries, and are now in ruins. Structures built before the Industrial Revolution reflect society as it was at that time, and the main occupations of farming and fishing. They include farmhouses, such as the building known as the Seneschal's House, which dates from 1598 and is the oldest standing building in the urban area; buildings relating to stately homes, such as the loggia and ice house in the grounds of Norton Priory; domestic buildings, such as Halton Old Hall, and buildings relating to the church, such as Halton Vicarage and the adjacent Chesshyre Library.

The diversity of Runcorn's buildings increased during the Industrial Revolution. Structures such as Bridgewater House were associated with industry, while large domestic buildings such as Halton Grange were financed by the new wealth created. The enlarged town required new civic buildings such as the Old Police Station (originally a Town Hall) and transport infrastructure such as the railway bridge and the tide dock, while the needs of the growing population were met by structures such as Norton Water Tower. All of the listed churches were built in the 19th century; architects include John Douglas, Anthony Salvin, Sir George Gilbert Scott, and Edmund Sharpe. The most recent listed structure is the Silver Jubilee Bridge, constructed in 1961.

Except for the iron or steel included in the bridges and the water tower, the structures are built in brick or stone. The stone is almost invariably red sandstone, obtained from local quarries in the Runcorn, Weston, and Halton areas. Unless stated otherwise, the buildings (except the bridges and the water tower) are constructed in local red sandstone with slate roofs. Their locations can be found on the map of all coordinates.

== Key ==
| Grade | Criteria |
|---|---|
| I | Buildings of exceptional interest, sometimes considered to be internationally important |
| II* | Particularly important buildings of more than special interest |
| II | Buildings of national importance and special interest |

== Listed buildings ==
| Name | Photograph | Grade | Date | Location | Description |
|---|---|---|---|---|---|
| Halton Castle | The walls of a ruined castle with one remaining arch | I | 1070 and later | Halton; 53.3332°N 2.6957°W | Built after the Norman Conquest, the castle became the seat of the Barons of Halton. It was besieged twice during the Civil War and subsequently fell into ruin. In about 1800, additional walls were built on its east side to improve its appearance from Norton Priory. It is a scheduled monument, owned by the Duchy of Lancaster and managed by the Norton Priory Museum Trust. |
| Norton Priory | The low-level foundations of the priory buildings | I | 1115 and later | Norton Priory; 53.3424°N 2.6796°W | This former Augustinian Priory, later an abbey, was reduced to a ruin following the dissolution of the monasteries. A Tudor mansion house was built on the site by Richard Brooke; this was replaced by a Georgian house in 1730. The latter house was demolished in 1928. The site is now a museum which consists of the remains of the priory, including a Norman undercroft with a doorway of 1180 and a Victorian copy, and two blind Norman arcades. It is a scheduled monument and is managed by the Norton Priory Museum Trust. |
| Seneschal's House | A stone house in three storeys with three gables | II* | 1598 | Halton; 53.3350°N 2.6957°W | This is the oldest standing building in Runcorn. The house is E-shaped and its gables have corbels, moulded copings and sandstone ridges with ball finials. It was latterly a farmhouse although originally built and inhabited by the judge John King in the late 16th century in recognition of which Geoffrey Barraclough renamed the property The Seneschal's House. |
| Halton Old Hall | A sandstone house with gables | II* | 1693 | Halton; 53.3322°N 2.6933°W | This is a house which was rebuilt after having been damaged in the English Civil War. A two-storey wing was later added to the north. The house has mullion windows and a studded door. |
| Tricorn Public House, formerly Hallwood | A brick Georgian-style house with five bays, two storeys and an attic | II* | c. 1710 | Palacefields; 53.3219°N 2.6910°W | Now a public house, this was formerly a wing of a mansion house called Hallwood, the birthplace and home of Sir John Chesshyre. It is in brown brick and stone with a slate roof. |
| Chesshyre Library | A small sandstone building with a slate roof | II* | 1730 | Halton; 53.3319°N 2.6956°W | The library was built for the incumbent of St Mary's Church by Sir John Chesshyre. Its doorcase is surrounded by Ionic columns with a triangular pediment. The roof has a cornice, a solid parapet, stone gables, and a chimney. Since 1975, it has been linked to the church hall and used as a meeting room. |
| Castle Hotel | A stone building with protruding lateral wings, and a coat of arms in the centre | II* | 1737 | Halton; 53.3330°N 2.6957°W | This building was originally integrated into the walls of the castle and used as a court house. The court room was on the first floor and prisoners were housed in the cellars. The entrance to the court room is approached by an external stone staircase, and its doorcase is surmounted by the Royal Arms. It is now a public house. |
| Halton Vicarage | A stone building with five bays and a central porch supported by columns | II* | 1739 | Halton; 53.3320°N 2.6956°W | The vicarage was paid for by Sir John Chesshyre. On its front are pilasters and a Doric porch. The windows are sash windows. The eaves consist of a cornice with a solid parapet, which is pedimented over the centre bay. It is still in use as a vicarage. |
| All Saints Church | The tall steeple of a sandstone church with prominent lucarnes | II* | 1849 | Runcorn Town Centre; 53.3435°N 2.7366°W | Built on the site of an earlier medieval church, the parish church of Runcorn was designed in Early English style by Anthony Salvin. It consists of a five-bay nave with aisles, a chancel which is reduced in both width and height, and a tower with a spire at the southwest corner of the nave. |
| Runcorn Railway Bridge | A bridge across a river, consisting of iron lattice girders on sandstone piers | II* | 1868 | Runcorn Town Centre; 53.3468°N 2.7383°W | Spanning the River Mersey to provide a more direct rail connection between London and Liverpool, the bridge is constructed of iron girders on sandstone piers. It is approached on each side by arched viaducts. At both ends of the bridge are square towers with crenellations and machicolations. The structure was designed by William Baker and now carries the Liverpool branch of the West Coast Main Line. |
| St John's Church | A stone church with squat west tower topped by a short broach spire | II* | 1897 | Weston; 53.3190°N 2.7388°W | St John's Church has a short broach spire, a nave, and a chancel at a higher level, with the vestry below. It was designed by John Douglas. Some of the money for its construction was raised by the choirboys, who wrote appeal letters; it is therefore sometimes known as "the choirboys' church". St John's became a separate parish in 1931. |
| Weston Cross | A sandstone cross with a Celtic-type head | II | Medieval | Weston; 53.31919°N 2.73967°W | This contains the former steps to a market cross. It consists of a square base, two steps high, to which a third modern step was added when the present Celtic-style cross was erected in 1960. |
| Weston Old Hall and barn | A two-storey stone house with protruding lateral wings | II | 1607 | Weston; 53.3176°N 2.7383°W | This former farmhouse and the barn sited behind it are listed separately as Grade II. The house has four bays; the outer bays project forwards and the third bay contains the porch. The windows have mullions. The roof of the barn has gable copings and a blue-tile ridge. |
| Cavendish Farm House | A two-storey house with a protruding wing on the left | II | c. 1622 | Weston; 53.31817°N 2.73709°W | This former farmhouse is built on an L-plan. The wing has a ten-light double chamfered mullion window on both storeys. The windows elsewhere are mostly of three lights. |
| 125 and 127 Main Street | A pair of two-storey rendered cottages with a timber-framed upper floor | II | Early 17th century | Halton; 53.33042°N 2.69286°W | This was a pair of two-storey cottages that has been combined into one house. Its lower storey is in sandstone, while the upper storey is timber-framed with rendered infill. |
| Manor Farm House | A small two-storey stone house with a protruding right wing | II | Early 17th century | Weston; 53.31818°N 2.73895°W | This former farmhouse has a single stone-mullioned window in the attic. |
| Village Farm House, 45 Main Street | A long, low two-storey house with mullioned windows | II | Early 17th century | Halton; 53.3329°N 2.6975°W | This was formerly a farmhouse. It has mullion windows that contain leaded lights. At the first-floor level and above the first-floor window are string courses. A later section to the north is in random rubble. |
| Rock Farm House | A two-storey stone house with a right protruding wing in brick | II | 17th century | Halton; 53.33098°N 2.69497°W | This former farmhouse has mullion windows. A newer addition to its east is in brick on old sandstone foundations. |
| Brookfield Farm, 2 Weston Road | A low stone single-storey house with a dormer | II | 1691 | Higher Runcorn; 53.3337°N 2.7395°W | This farmhouse is in stone with a brick gable and has a machine-tile roof. An original stone mullion window is still present on the ground floor on the west front. The original entrance has been filled in and a new entrance built. |
| Borrow's Bridge and crane | | II | c. 1700 | Norton; 53.32921°N 2.65957°W | The bridge is an accommodation bridge, and is bridge No. 69 over the Bridgewater Canal. It is in red brick with gritstone dressings, and consists of a single segmental arch. The bridge has voussoirs, a sandstone band, and splayed abutments. Adjacent to the bridge is a hand-cranked crane in cast iron that has a moulded framed and panelled side plates, external cog wheels, a cable drum, and a tubular jib ending in a pulley wheel. |
| Former stables of Hallwood | A long stone building with windows, doors, filled openings and round pitch holes | II | c. 1710 | Palacefields; 53.3223°N 2.6909°W | This building was formerly the stables of Hallwood. Its façade includes five giant Doric pilasters and two pedimented doorways. On the lower floor are five sash windows, and on the upper floor the windows are round. It is now used as a function room for the adjacent public house. |
| 6, 8 and 10 Castle Road | A row of three low cottages in sandstone with painted stone window surrounds | II | Early 18th century | Halton; 53.3317°N 2.6951°W | This row of three cottages has sash windows. One chimney stack is in stone. |
| 53 and 55 High Street | A Georgian house with three storeys and three bays, and with a two-bay two-storey extension on the right | II | Early 18th century | Runcorn Town Centre; 53.3413°N 2.7330°W | This is a town house in Georgian style. It is in red brick with stone dressings and has a slate roof. In the 19th century, it was the home of Thomas Hazlehurst, a soap and alkali maker, and is now used by the adjoining bank and as a solicitors' office. |
| Hollybank House, 51 Main Street | A rendered house with two storeys, three bays, and a decorated pediment over the central doorway | II | Early 18th century | Halton; 53.33231°N 2.69745°W | This house is in rendered brick with a slate roof. It has a moulded stone plinth and rusticated quoins. The stone doorcase has Ionic pilasters, a pulvinated frieze, and a swan-neck pediment with a cartouche in the tympanum. |
| Norton Lodge | A brick building in two storeys with a French window | II | Early 18th century | Norton; 53.33326°N 2.66795°W | This house is in brown brick on a stone plinth. It has a timber doorcase with a rectangular fanlight, a pulvinated frieze and a pediment. |
| Gates of Chesshyre Library | A pair of stone gate piers with ball finials | II | c. 1730 | Halton; 53.3319°N 2.6956°W | The gate piers in the wall fronting the entrance to the Chesshyre Library consist of squared sandstone blocks with ball finials. The piers are set in an ashlar wall. |
| The Elms, 4 Weston Road | A two-storey Georgian brick house with two storeys, five bays, and a lower single-bay extension on each side | II | Mid 18th century | Higher Runcorn; 53.3341°N 2.7401°W | This town house in red brick with a slate roof is in the Georgian style. It has a moulded plinth and rusticated quoins. The segmental pedimented Doric doorcase has fluted pilasters and triglyphs. |
| The Nook, 5 Weston Road | A long roughcast house in two storeys | II | Mid 18th century | Higher Runcorn; 53.3338°N 2.7409°W | This house is constructed in roughcast stone and brickwork, under a slate roof with a sandstone ridge. The stone doorcase has a moulded architrave and a stone arch with a keystone. |
| Ice House, Norton Priory | A stone structure with an archway, covered in turf | II | 18th century | Norton Priory; 53.3467°N 2.6817°W | This ice house stands adjacent to the walled garden of Norton Priory. It is in brick under an earth mound. It is beehive-shaped and is approached along a short tunnel, which leads into a circular domed chamber. |
| Norton Arms Public House | A rendered two-storey public house with steps leading up to a central doorway | II | 1758 | Halton; 53.3346°N 2.6956°W | This is a public house built in roughcast brickwork on a stone moulded plinth with rusticated quoins and a slate roof. The stone doorcase has plain pilasters, moulded caps, and an archivolt with a keystone. |
| Bridgewater House | A large Georgian house in three storeys and three bays, with a central doorway approached by a flight of steps | II | 1760s | Runcorn Dock; 53.3424°N 2.7459°W | This was originally a mansion house built to provide accommodation for the Duke of Bridgewater when he was supervising the construction and administration of the Bridgewater Canal. It is in brown brick with a slate roof and has a stone Doric doorcase. It has been converted into use as offices. |
| Weston Grange | A two-storey rendered house with bay windows and painted stone dressings | II | 1766 | Weston; 53.31943°N 2.73986°W | This house is in roughcast brick with a slate roof on a stone plinth, and it has rusticated quoins. The stone pedimented doorcase has a pulvinated frieze and a decorative inscribed tympanum. There are stone copings to the roof gables. |
| Tide dock and lock | A water-filled dock with stone walls | II | c. 1772 | Runcorn Dock; 53.3432°N 2.7455°W | This structure consists of a tide dock together with the retaining walls of a lock. The opening was originally into the River Mersey but following the construction of the Manchester Ship Canal it now opens into the canal. It is in sandstone blocks and there have since been some repairs in brick and concrete. |
| 31 Main Street | A stone building with Gothick-style windows containing lattice tracery | II | Late 18th century | Halton; 53.33392°N 2.69673°W | This building was formerly the stables to Halton House. Its ground floor has three Gothic windows with rendered surrounds, stone sills, and cast iron lattice casement windows. At the first-floor level there is a square pitch hole. The roof was raised in the 1960s and the building is now used as a dwelling. |
| 58 High Street | A brick building in two storeys with modern shop fronts and a pedimented doorway | II | Late 18th century | Runcorn Town Centre; 53.3414°N 2.7351°W | This was originally a cottage built in brown brick with a slate roof. The doorcase has stone Tuscan columns and an open pediment. The building has been converted into use as a shop. |
| 71 High Street | A brick building in three storeys and three bays, with a doorway surrounds by pilasters and a pediment | II | Late 18th century | Runcorn Town Centre; 53.3413°N 2.7340°W | This town house is in red brick and has a slate roof. It stands on a stone plinth and has a stone Tuscan doorcase with an open pediment and a patterned arched fanlight above. It has been converted for business use. |
| Garden Loggia, Norton Priory | A stone loggia with four columns supporting an entablature, and containing a wooden seat | II | Late 18th century | Norton Priory; 53.34162°N 2.68012°W | The loggia is in yellow sandstone, with some brickwork, in the former garden of Norton Priory house. It has two Doric columns and antae at the front of the side walls. |
| Rockfield, 7 Weston Road | A rendered house with two storeys, five bays, and a central doorway with columns and a pediment | II | Late 18th century | Higher Runcorn; 53.3338°N 2.7416°W | This house is constructed in rendered brickwork with a slate roof. The stone Doric doorcase has an open pediment and a radial bar fanlight. |
| Royal Hotel | A brick public house in three storeys with some rendering on the ground floor | II | Late 18th century | Runcorn Town Centre; 53.3422°N 2.7303°W | This hotel at the east end of High Street was formerly known as the White Hart, and was a meeting place for members of local government before a town hall was built. It is in brown brick and has a slate roof. |
| 53 Holloway | A two-storey brick house with stone dressings and a pedimented doorway | II | 1779 | Higher Runcorn; 53.3344°N 2.7404°W | This brown-brick house has a slate roof, a stone plinth and quoins. The pedimented stone doorcase has an architrave and a frieze. Its entrance door is studded. |
| Halton House, 33 Main Street | A symmetrical brick house in two storeys with a central pedimented doorway | II | 1779 | Halton; 53.33384°N 2.69695°W | This house is in brown brick with a sandstone slate roof. The walls have rusticated stone quoins. The doorcase is in stone with eared architraves, a pulvinated frieze, and a pediment with an inscribed tympanum. |
| 12, 14 and 16 Castle Road | A row of brick cottages in two storeys with stone dressings and a prominent string course | II | Early 19th century | Halton; 53.3318°N 2.6951°W | This row of three cottages is in brown brick with slate roofs. The cottages are on a stone plinth; they have quoins, and horizontal-sliding sash windows. |
| 59, 61 and 63 Main Street | A terrace of three two-storey houses, each with a doorway flanked by columns, above which is a fanlight | II | Early 19th century | Halton; 53.33096°N 2.69579°W | This row of three houses is in red brick with a slate roof on a stone plinth. The doorcases have Tuscan columns with elliptical fanlights and rubbed arches. |
| 88, 90, 92 and 94 Main Street | A brick building in two storeys with protruding lateral wings, and a central doorway with a porch carried on three columns | II | 1827 | Halton; 53.33066°N 2.69319°W | This row of four cottages is in red brick on a sandstone plinth and has a slate roof. |
| Waterloo Bridge | A curving iron bridge with three arches carried on sandstone piers | II | 1828 | Runcorn Town Centre; 53.3405°N 2.7387°W | This road bridge over the Bridgewater Canal has three arches. A sidewalk and a parapet were added in 1886. The bridge is constructed in red sandstone with a cast iron balustraded parapet. |
| Old Police Station | A sandstone building in two storeys, its façade including a Pediments with a clock above, and a balustraded parapet | II | 1831 | Runcorn Town Centre; 53.3423°N 2.7298°W | This was Runcorn's first town hall. It later became a police station, with cells in the basement, and a magistrates' court. The façade is of red sandstone and the rest of the building is in brick with a slate roof. Its entrance is flanked by Ionic pilasters carrying a frieze and a pediment. It has been converted into use as offices. |
| Hearse House | A small sandstone building with a large round-headed arch | II | c. 1833 | Runcorn Town Centre; 53.3430°N 2.7359°W | The building stands in the grounds of the parish church and was used to house hearses. It has been converted into use as an electrical substation. |
| Norton Priory Lodge, 120 Main Street | A small stone building in a single storey, with a blocked doorway and windows containing lattice tracery | II | Early–mid 19th century | Halton; 53.33037°N 2.69050°W | Originally a lodge to Norton Priory, this is now a private dwelling. It has two-light mullion windows flanking a built-up door opening. The eaves cornice rests on large stone brackets and the roof is hipped. |
| Holy Trinity Church | A stone church with lancet windows and a west tower with pinnacles | II | 1838 | Runcorn Town Centre; 53.3422°N 2.7282°W | This church was built in 1838 and the chancel was added in 1857. It consists of a five-bay nave with a narrower chancel, and there is a tower at the west end. |
| Christ Church and railings, Weston Point | A distant view of a stone church with a tall steeple | II | 1841 | Weston Point; 53.3287°N 2.7611°W | A church, now redundant, that was built by the Trustees of the Weaver Navigation for its employees. It is designed in Early English style and has a broach spire. The railings surrounding the church are included in the listing. The architect was Edmund Sharpe. The church is now situated in the Port of Runcorn and is inaccessible to the public. |
| St Mary's Church | A stone church seen from the south, with a bellcote on the junction of the nave and chancel | II | 1851 | Halton; 53.3320°N 2.6963°W | St Mary's Church was built to replace an ancient chapel. It was designed by Sir George Gilbert Scott, and stands in a prominent position on Halton Hill near the castle. The church has a four-bay nave with aisles, and its chancel is at a lower level. There is an octagonal bell turret above the junction of the nave and chancel. St Mary's became a separate parish in 1860. |
| Town Hall, formerly Halton Grange | A rendered Italianate-style building with a bay window and a belvedere | II | 1856 | Runcorn Heath Road; 53.3336°N 2.7238°W | This was built as a mansion house, Halton Grange, for Thomas Johnson, a local soap and alkali manufacturer, in the style of an Italianate villa with a belvedere tower. Its exterior is rendered and it has a slate roof. At its entrance is a Tuscan portico with an open balustrade above. It now forms part of Runcorn Town Hall. |
| Red Lodge, Manor Farm Road | A house in Tudor Revival style with a brick lower storeys and a gabled timber-framed upper storey | II | 1870 | Norton; 53.34894°N 2.66740°W | The lodge was at the northeast approach to Norton Priory. It was built for Sir Richard Brooke, 7th Baronet of Norton Priory, and has since been converted into a private house. The lodge is in Tudor Revival style. It has an irregular cruciform plan and two storeys, the lower storey being in red sandstone, and the upper in painted brick and timber framing. On each side is a gabled bay with a jettied upper floor. The boundary fencing, the gates, and the gate piers are included in the listing. |
| NatWest Bank, High Street | A brick building with a protruding entrance bay flanked by stone columns | II | Late 19th century | Runcorn Town Centre; 53.3414°N 2.7328°W | The bank is in red brick with polished granite columns flanking the entrance. It has a parapeted roof. |
| Walls, piers and railings, St Paul's Health Centre, High Street | Stone walls carrying decorative railings, and piers with elaborate lamp posts | II | Late 19th century | Runcorn Town Centre; 53.3414°N 2.7325°W | These stone and cast iron structures originally formed the entrance to a Methodist chapel, which has been replaced by a health centre. |
| Norton Water Tower | A circular stone tower with pilasters and arches, carrying an iron tank | II | 1892 | Norton; 53.3294°N 2.6714°W | This is a cylindrical balancing reservoir on the water pipeline from Lake Vyrnwy to Liverpool. Ten pilasters on its outer surface rise to a frieze which carries a Latin inscription. The tower is surmounted by a decorated iron tank. |
| Old Quay Bridge | A bridge with a curving arch crossing a canal, with the hydraulic tower on the left | II | c. 1894 | Runcorn Town Centre; 53.3441°N 2.7220°W | This swing bridge over the Manchester Ship Canal links Runcorn with Wigg Island. It is operated from the south bank of the canal by means of a hydraulic system. This is operated from machinery in a group of three slate-roofed red-brick buildings, an engine house, an accumulator tower and the control building. |
| Carnegie Library | A two-storey building in sandstone with an arched doorway, and mullioned and transomed windows | II | 1906 | Runcorn Town Centre; 53.3420°N 2.7374°W | This purpose-built library in Egerton Street was constructed with a grant from Andrew Carnegie. It includes Mackintosh-style stained glass windows. Inside is an ornate cast iron spiral staircase. It was listed in 2007. |
| War Memorial | A white cross standing on a plinth and steps and behind is a wall with inscribed plaques | II | 1920 | Higher Runcorn; 53.33343°N 2.73882°W | The war memorial was built to commemorate those lost in the First World War, and the names of those lost in later conflicts were subsequently added. It stands in a small garden, and consists of a Latin cross in white granite on a pedestal and steps. Behind it is a wall containing plaques with inscriptions and the names of those lost. |
| Runcorn signal box | A brick signal box with a flat concrete roof, and a row of steel-framed windows | II | 1940 | Runcorn Town Centre; 53.3373°N 2.7387°W | The signal box is at the south end of Runcorn railway station. It was built for the London, Midland and Scottish Railway early in the Second World War, and was designed to minimise blast damage from aerial bombing. It is constructed in brick with steel-framed windows set in concrete, and has a reinforced concrete roof. It was listed in 2013. |
| Silver Jubilee Bridge | An arch bridge crossing a canal and river | II | 1961 | Runcorn Town Centre; 53.3463°N 2.7379°W | This road bridge crosses the River Mersey and links Runcorn with Widnes, replacing the Widnes–Runcorn Transporter Bridge. It is a through arch bridge which carries a four-lane carriageway and a cantilevered footway to the east. Its span is 1,082 feet (330 m) and its total length is 1,628 feet (496 m). |

== See also ==
- Listed buildings in Runcorn (rural area)
