= Red Lodge =

Red lodge may refer to:

- Red Lodge, Montana, United States
  - Red Lodge Mountain Resort
  - Red Lodge Airport
- Red Lodge, Norton, Runcorn, Cheshire, England
- Red Lodge, Suffolk, United Kingdom
- Red Lodge Museum, Bristol, United Kingdom
- Red Lodge Provincial Park, Alberta, Canada
- Red Lodge (United States), fraternity in the United States
