= Hallwood, Cheshire =

Hallwood
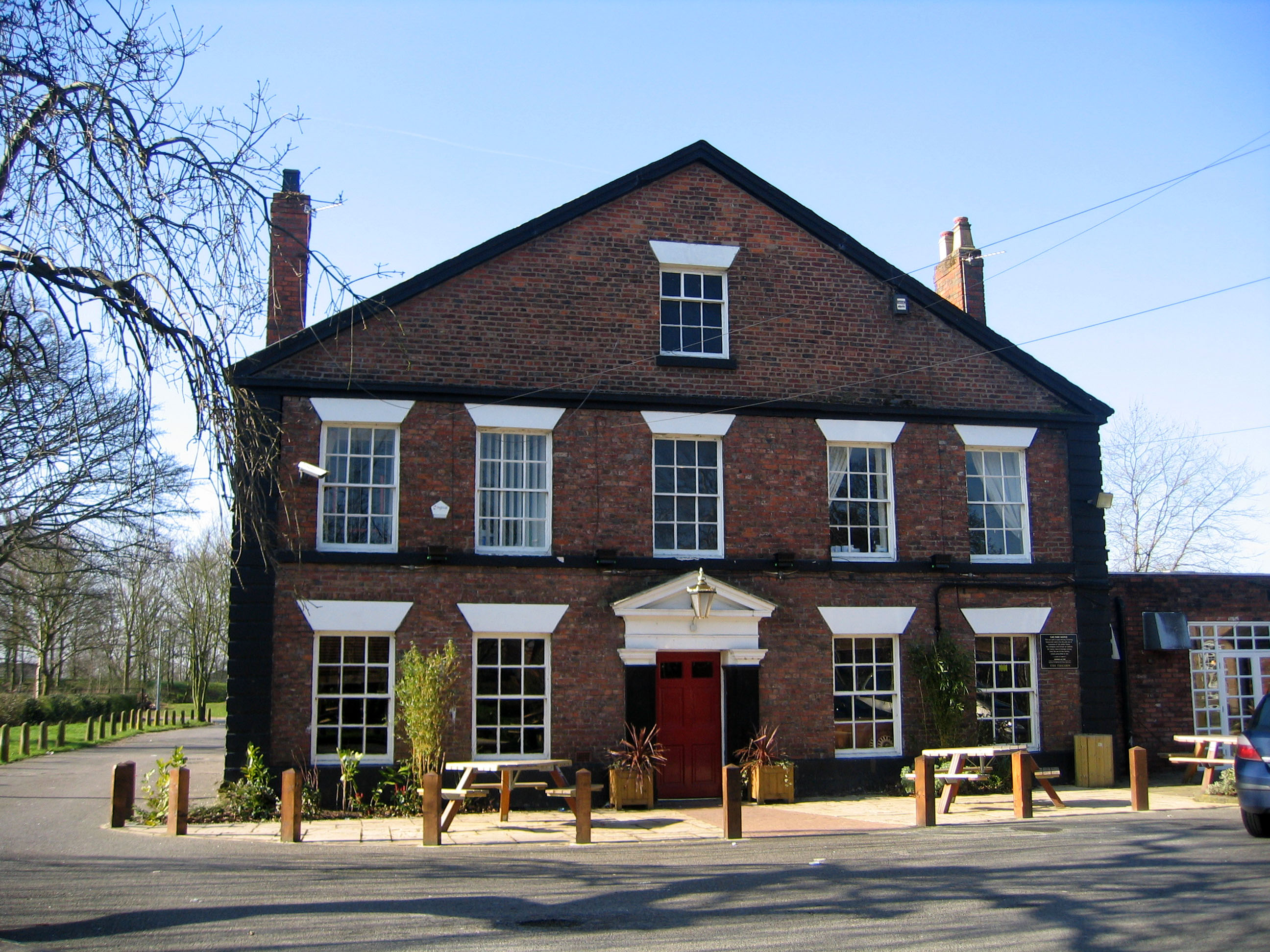
- Former wing of Hallwood

- Location in Cheshire
- 53.3219°N 2.6910°W
- OS grid reference: SJ 540 807

Listed Building – Grade II*
- Designated: 23 April 1970
- Reference no.: 1130425

Hallwood is a former mansion house in Runcorn, Cheshire, England. One wing of the house remains and was a public house called the Tricorn until its closure in 2017. Its former stables were converted into a function room for the public house. The remaining wing of Hallwood is recorded in the National Heritage List for England as a designated Grade II* listed building; the former stables are listed at Grade II.

== History ==
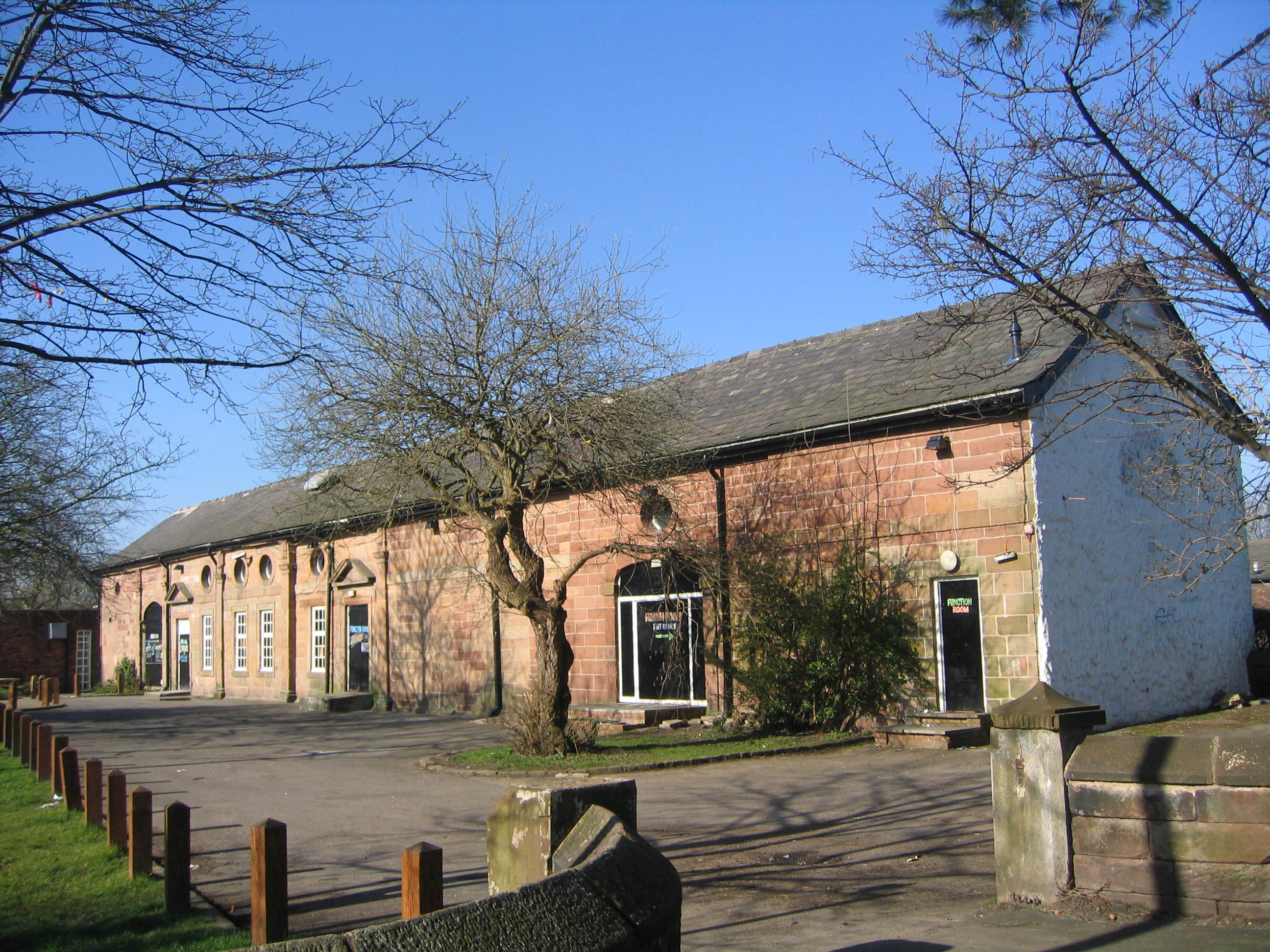
Former stables of Hallwood, now a function room

It originated as a moated house which was possibly the home of the keeper of the deer park called Halton Park or Northwood to the south of Halton, and which was probably built in the second half of the 15th century.

The present house was probably built by Thomas Chesshyre, an official of the Duchy of Lancaster, shortly before 1660. Some later alterations (notably a new baroque south façade and drawing room c.1720, now lost), probably to designs by Francis Smith, were made by his son, Sir John Chesshyre. In 1800, the house was purchased by Sir Richard Brooke of Norton Priory nearby. He commissioned plans, possibly from architect Samuel Wyatt, to modernise the house but they were not implemented.

In the 19th century, the building was used as a boarding school called Hallwood Academy. Much of the house was demolished after it became unsafe from bombing in the Second World War. The remaining part became the Tricorn public house which closed in 2017.

The lost south façade bore considerable similarities to Hockenhull Hall attributed to Francis Smith of Warwick.

== See also ==
- Grade I and II* listed buildings in Halton (borough)
- Listed buildings in Runcorn (urban area)
