= Halton Old Hall =

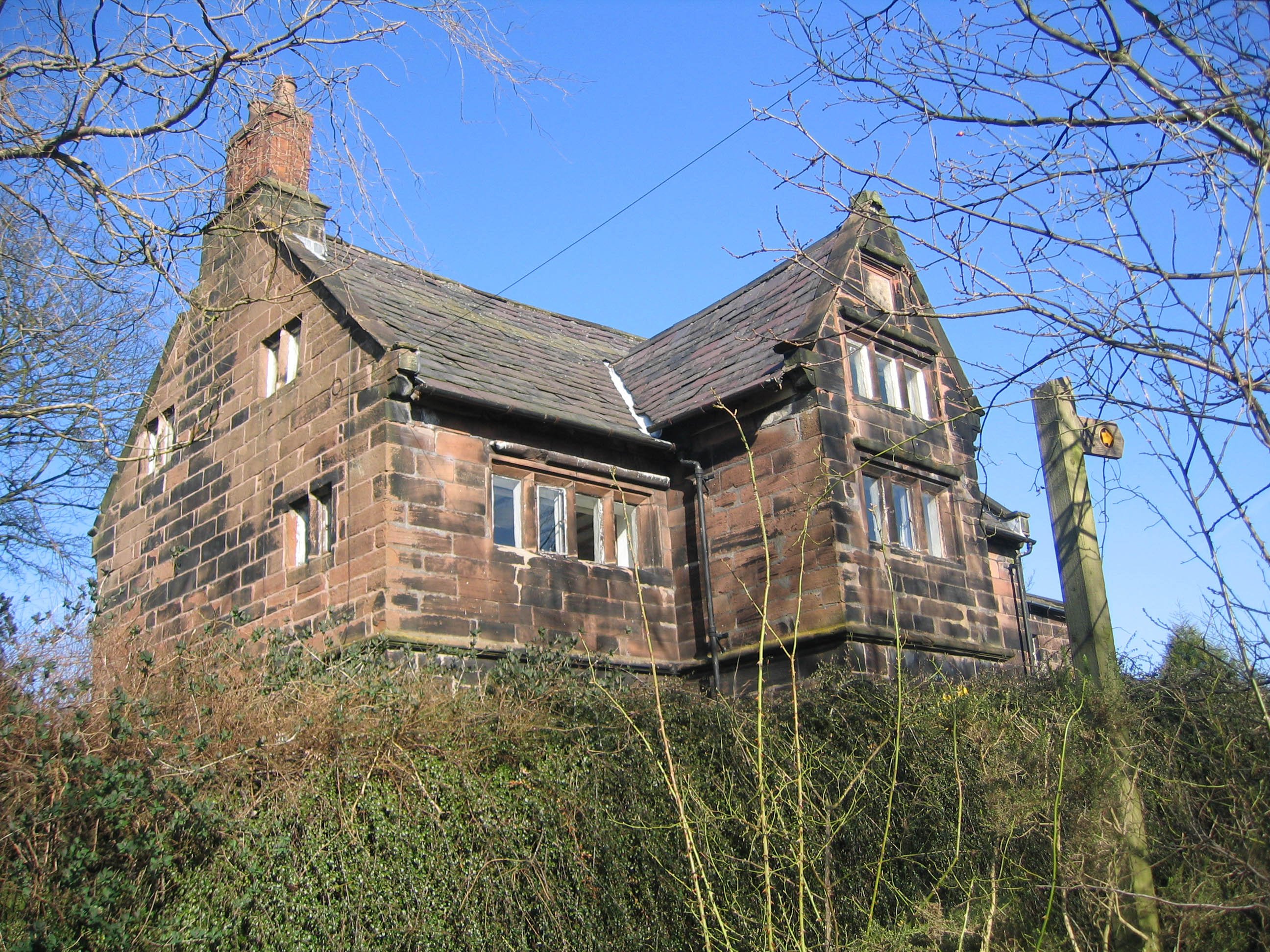
- Halton Old Hall

- Location in Cheshire
- 53.3322°N 2.6934°W
- Location: Halton, Cheshire, England
- OS grid reference: SJ 539 819

History
- Built: 1693; 333 years ago

Listed Building – Grade II*
- Designated: 4 March 1969; 57 years ago
- Reference no.: 1130461

Halton Old Hall is a house in the village of Halton in Runcorn, Cheshire, England. It is recorded in the National Heritage List for England as a designated Grade II* listed building. The house dates from 1693, and is built in sandstone with a slate roof. It has two storeys and an attic; a two-storey wing has been added to the back. The windows have mullions and the gables have corbels and copings. Both Starkey and Nikolaus Pevsner note that its style is older than its date.

== See also ==
- Grade I and II* listed buildings in Halton (borough)
- Listed buildings in Runcorn (urban area)
