= Seneschal's House, Halton =

Seneschal's House, Runcorn
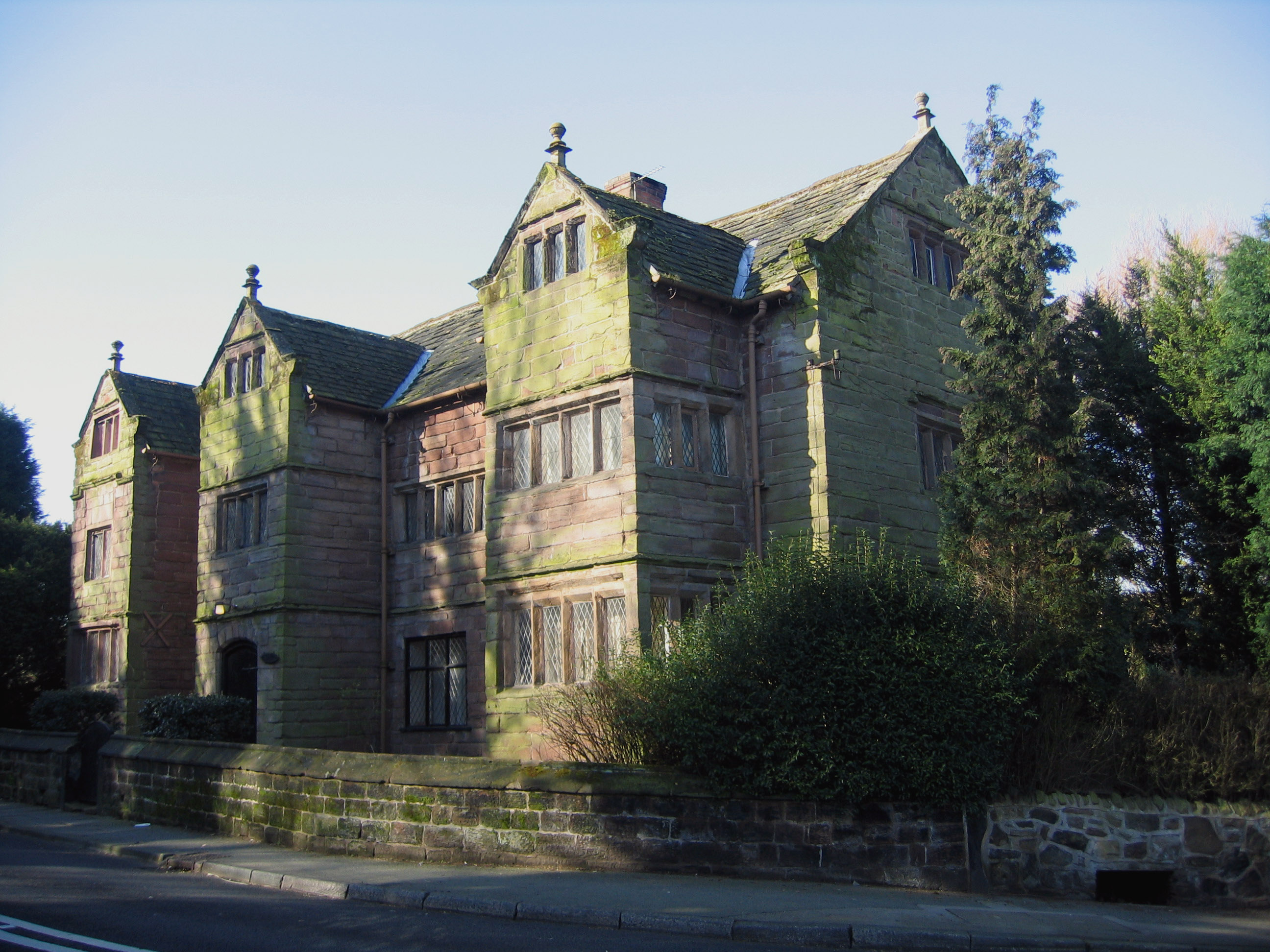
- Seneschal's House, Runcorn

- Location in Cheshire
- 53.3350°N 2.6958°W
- OS grid reference: SJ 537 822

History
- Built: 1598; 428 years ago

Listed Building – Grade II*
- Designated: 20 October 1952; 73 years ago
- Reference no.: 1330346

The Seneschal's House stands at the corner of Halton Brow and Main Street in Runcorn, Cheshire. It is recorded in the National Heritage List for England as a designated Grade II* listed building.

The house is dated 1598, which makes it the oldest standing building in Runcorn. It was latterly a farmhouse although was originally built by the judge John King, called to the bar in London in the late 16th century and was originally known as "John King's New House"; the occupation of the original owner of the house, led to a later owner, Geoffrey Barraclough, Professor of History at Liverpool University in the mid 20th century coining the current name of the house. The house was, in fact, inhabited originally by a seneschal, that is the original owner, John King.

The house is built with sandstone and it has a stone slate roof with a sandstone ridge. It is two storeys with an attic roof. At the front are three projections rising to the full height of the house. The central projection contains a porch; the others have bay windows with mullions. Each projection is surmounted by a gable and there are gables at each end of the house. The gables have corbels and moulded copings with finials at their summits.

== See also ==
- Grade I and II* listed buildings in Halton (borough)
- Listed buildings in Runcorn (urban area)
