= Carnegie Library, Runcorn =

Historic building in Cheshire, England

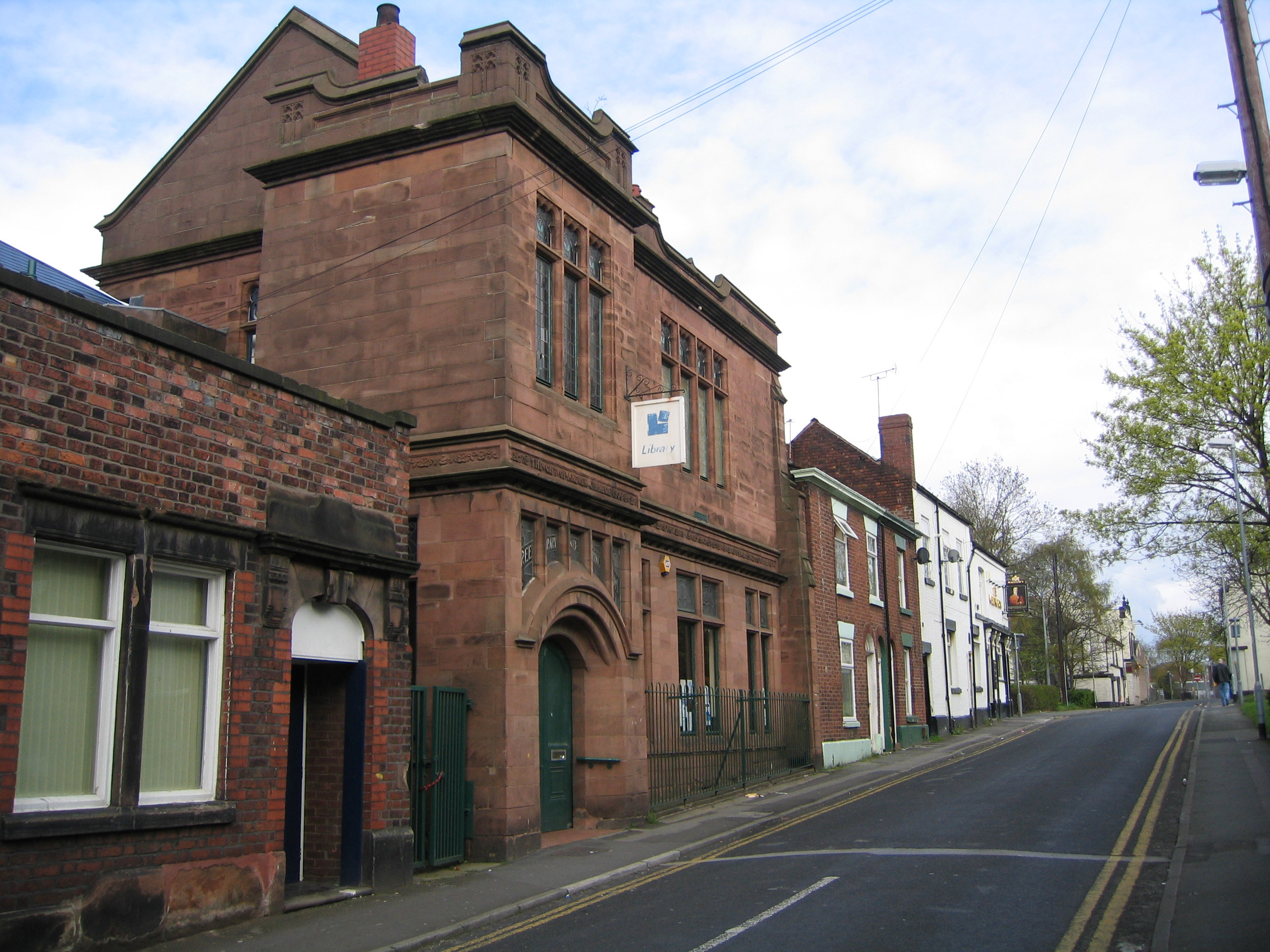
- Carnegie Library, Runcorn

- Location in Cheshire
- 53.3420°N 2.7374°W
- Location: Runcorn, Cheshire, England
- OS grid reference: SJ 510 830

History
- Built: 1906; 120 years ago
- Built for: Runcorn Urban District Council

Site notes
- Architect: James Wilding

Listed Building – Grade II
- Designated: 13 June 2007
- Reference no.: 1392040

The Carnegie Library is in Egerton Street, Runcorn, Cheshire, England. It is recorded in the National Heritage List for England as a designated Grade II listed building and "possesses special architectural and historic interest within a national context". It was built in 1906 as an extension to Waterloo House and the existing library with a grant from Andrew Carnegie, and closed in 2012.

== History ==
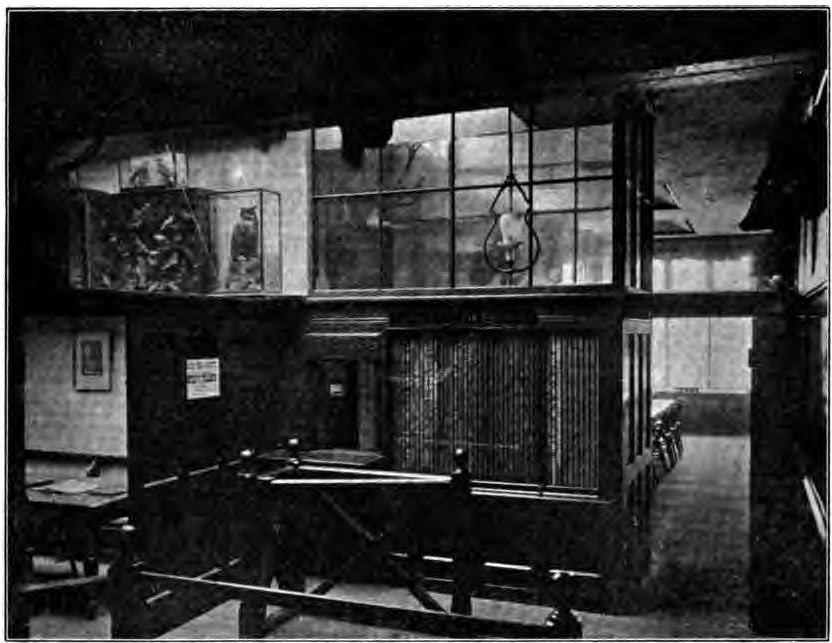
Runcorn Library Entrance Hall c.1901. Architect James Wilding.

Runcorn Public Library was established by public subscription on 29 January 1858. It was instigated by Philip Whiteway, jnr who had obtained subscriptions of £80 and contributions of books from friends. The library was located at the Literary Institute until the institute was dissolved in September 1864. In March 1865 the Runcorn Public Library was re-opened at the offices of the Runcorn Guardian newspaper on High Street. The subscription was one shilling per quarter. The library was moved to the Runcorn Literary and Mechanics’ Institute after it was established in October 1868. Towards the end of 1881 it was announced that the institute was to close. The Runcorn Public Library containing around a 1,000 volumes was consequently handed over to the Runcorn Free Public Library Committee by the Literary and Mechanics’ Institute.

Runcorn Free Public Library was established in 1882 under the provisions of the Public Libraries Act 1855. The Act was adopted by a large majority at a public meeting held on the 19 December 1881. The library was opened 6 July 1882 with great ceremony by James Picton, Chairman of the Liverpool Free Library Committee. Picton was presented with a silver key supplied by Messrs. Handley and Beck. The library was furnished with the stock and bookcases transferred from the Runcorn Literary and Mechanics' Institute. It was housed in the boardroom of the Runcorn Improvement Commissioners at the Town Hall in Bridge Street, which was seen as a temporary arrangement until a permanent location was found.

Waterloo House, a substantial late Georgian merchant's house with garden designed by Edward Kemp, situated on the corner of Waterloo Road and Egerton Street, was converted from a private residence to the new town hall, free public library and reading room. The architect of the conversion is thought to be James Wilding. The former owner of Waterloo House, Charles Hazlehurst, offered to fund the reading room for three years on the condition his choice of rooms were used for the library. He later withdrew the offer when different rooms were chosen. The opening ceremony, on 7 November 1883, included a procession from the former town hall in Bridge Street to the new premises, Waterloo House.

By 1896, the Runcorn Free Public Library housed around 8,000 books, two reading rooms (one for ladies) and had a separate library entrance on Egerton Street. Lectures on the books in the library were given every winter in the adjacent Technical School as the reading room was too small.

After a bequest of 3,000 books and natural history specimens of British birds and animals in 1897 the library was extended. The existing reading rooms were added to the library and new reading rooms were erected, with a spacious gallery for the accommodation of the specimens. The architect was James Wilding.

In 1902, more library and reading room space was needed. The Runcorn Free Library Committee applied to Andrew Carnegie to fund the extension. Carnegie had provided grants for many other libraries in the United Kingdom and elsewhere. Carnegie replied in 1903 that he had received an overwhelming number of applications. In 1904 Carnegie refused the grant as he believed the income of the Library Committee would not support larger premises. An amended application was made and Carnegie gifted £3,000 in November 1904 to erect a new public library stipulating that a site must also be given for the building. At a Runcorn Urban District Council meeting in June 1905 it was decided to carry out the plans for the library alteration and extension using the £3,000 gifted by Carnegie. An exterior wall of Waterloo House formed an interior wall of the extended library, both buildings housing the library; the lending department in Waterloo House, the reading rooms and reference department in the new building.

The Carnegie Library was also designed by James Wilding, surveyor and water engineer to the Runcorn Urban District Council. During construction the reading room was transferred to temporary premises and the lending department was closed from April to June 1906. The library was opened with little ceremony on 1 December 1906 by Mr. Daniel Bisbrown, J.P., Chairman of the Runcorn Urban District Council, who was presented with a silver key with which he opened the main entrance. A public ceremony had been decided against as there was a risk of protests and boycotts by those who disagreed with how Carnegie made the money which enabled him to make the grant for the library. It remained Runcorn's central library until 9 November 1981 when a new library was opened at Runcorn Shopping City and the Carnegie Library became a branch library. It closed in 2012 when Runcorn Library was moved to the former market hall on Granville Street.

As of 2019, the Carnegie Library is under threat of partial demolition.

== Architecture ==
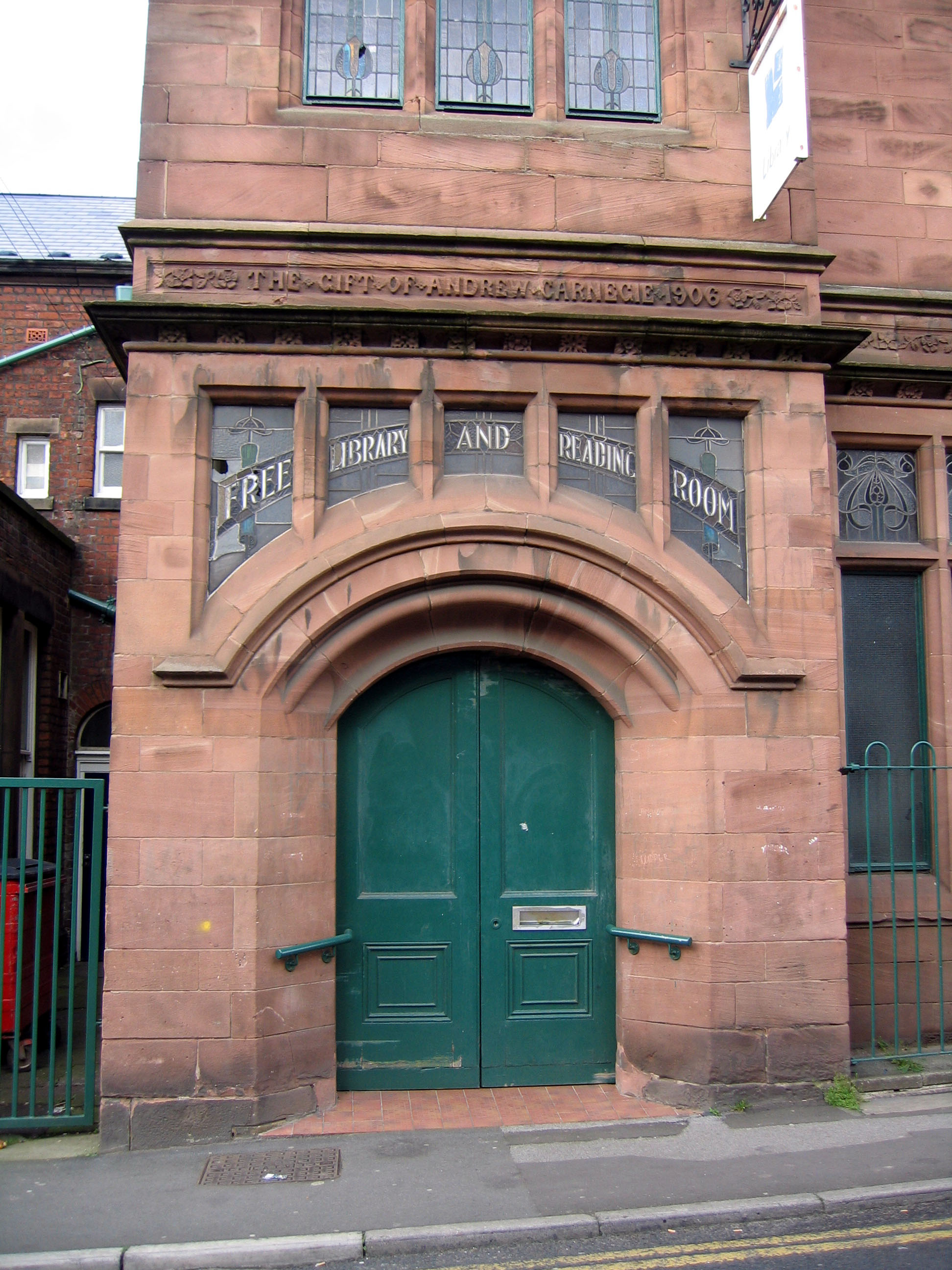
Entrance to library showing the stained glass above the door and the inscribed frieze

The Carnegie library building has a reverse L-shaped plan. It is a 1906 extension to Waterloo House which housed the existing library. According to the architect James Wilding's description, “it is designed in a late period of Gothic architecture and is quite and dignified in style and design”.

=== Exterior ===
The two storey south facing front elevation to Egerton street is built of Runcorn red sandstone, and the single storey rear range at a right angle to the road is in red brick. The front elevation has four bays; the left hand bay forms a corner tower which has a slight entasis. The main wall line was kept back to allow light into the basement. Its ground floor has an arched entrance, above which is a series of five lights containing stained glass and the words "Free Library and Reading Room". Above this is a carved stone frieze bearing the inscription "The Gift of Andrew Carnegie 1906". The upper storey has a six-light mullion and transom window containing stained glass with Mackintosh-style designs. At the summit is a parapet. In the ground floor of the other three bays are three four-light windows and in the upper floor is one eight-light window. Between them the frieze from the tower is continued and is carved with floral and foliage designs. These bays have a parapet similar to that on the tower.

=== Interior ===
Originally the entrance hall was accessed through a pair of sliding doors and a vestibule which was formed by a Van Kannel revolving door. The ladies’ reading room was on the right. The main reading room was further down and entered by swing doors. The remodeled lending library was also accessed from the hall; the existing bookstore and lending library had been turned into one room by removing walls and supporting the overhead rooms on girders. Inside the entrance lobby is a tiled mosaic floor, and the walls have dados of green and dark brown enameled bricks. An ornate cast-iron spiral staircase leads to the first floor former reference library. A secondary staircase from the old town hall was also incorporated into the Carnegie library and a room was provided at the north end of the flat roof, above the reading room, for studying natural history.

Since it was built, there have been considerable changes to the interior.

== See also ==
- Listed buildings in Runcorn (urban area)
