= The Castle, Halton =

The Castle
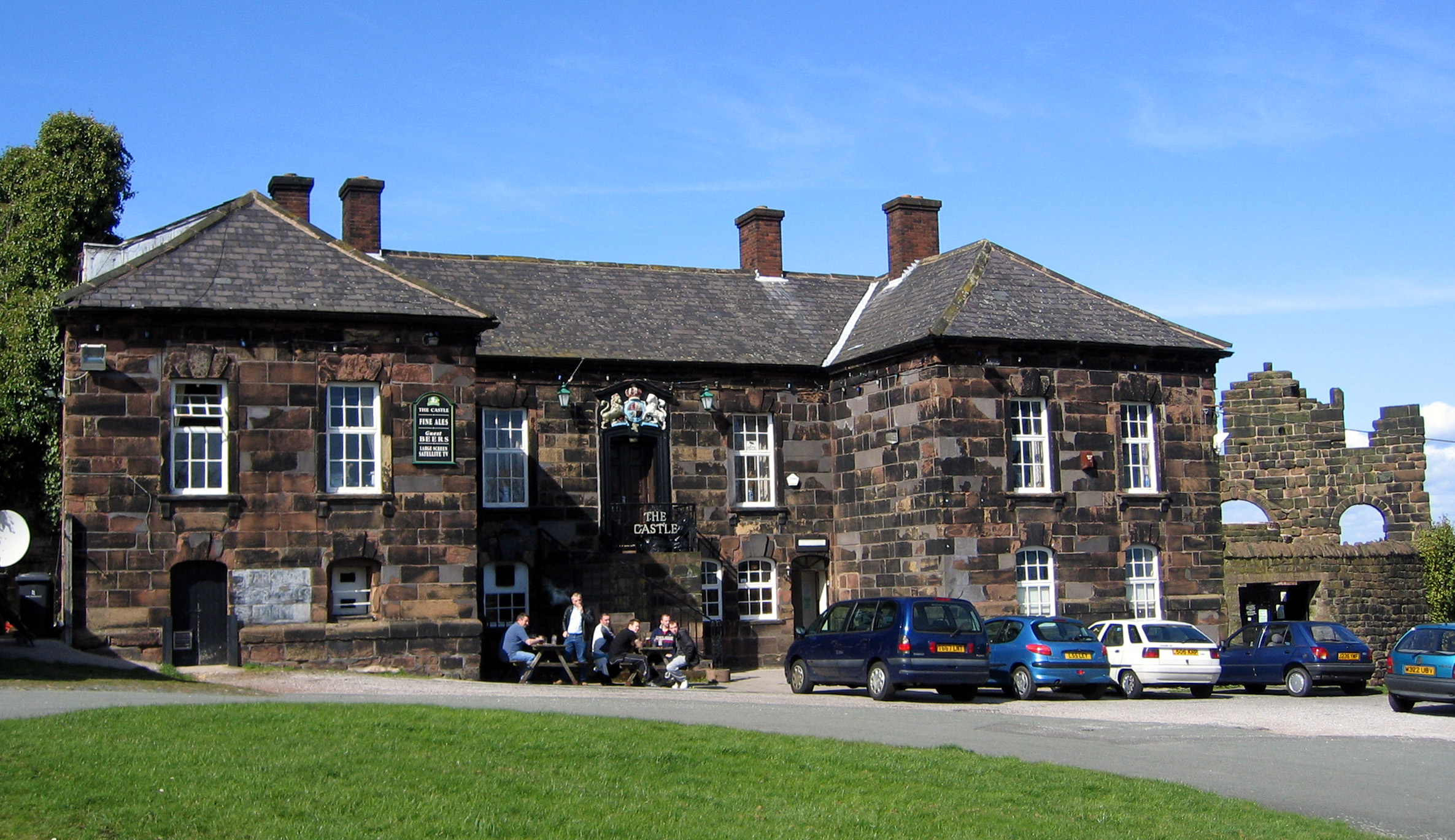
- The Castle public house with castle ruins to the right

- Location in Cheshire
- 53.3330°N 2.6957°W
- Location: Halton Hill, Halton, Runcorn, Cheshire, England
- OS grid reference: SJ 540 820

History
- Built: 1737; 289 years ago

Site notes
- Website: thecastlehalton.co.uk

Listed Building – Grade II*
- Designated: 20 October 1952
- Reference no.: 1115543

The Castle, formerly known as The Castle Hotel, is a public house and former Georgian courthouse on Halton Hill in Halton, Runcorn, Cheshire, England. Its side walls are continuous with the curtain walls of the ruins of Halton Castle. It is recorded in the National Heritage List for England as a designated Grade II* listed building.

== History ==
The building was originally a courthouse. The court at Halton had been held in the gatehouse of the castle. However, by 1737 its structure had deteriorated so badly that it was decided to build a new courthouse on the site of the gatehouse, using some of the stones from the previous building. The courtroom was on the first floor of the building and prisoners were held in cells in the basement.

== Architecture ==
The courthouse is constructed in red sandstone and it has a slate hipped roof. It has two storeys and seven bays; the lateral two bays project forward on each side. An outside staircase leads up to the first-floor door to the courtroom. Over its door are the Royal court of arms. Inside the courtroom is a marble tablet containing an inscription commemorating the completion of its building.

== See also ==
- Grade I and II* listed buildings in Halton (borough)
- Listed buildings in Runcorn (urban area)
