= Red Lodge, Norton =

Building in Runcorn, Cheshire, England

Coordinates: 53.34894°N 2.66740°W

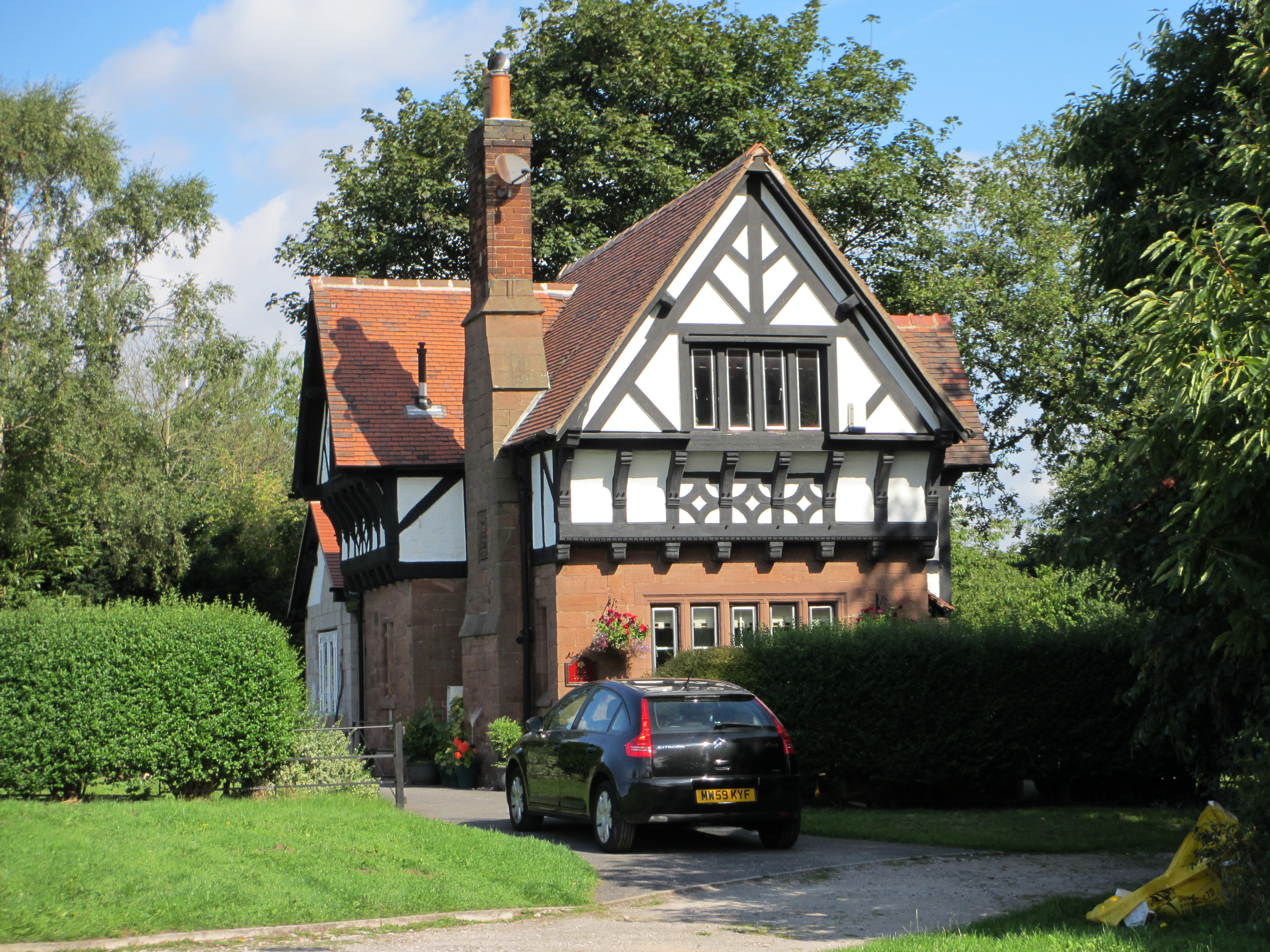
Red Lodge

Red Lodge, is in Manor Farm Road, Norton, Runcorn, Cheshire, England. Built originally as a lodge at the entrance to the estate of Norton Priory, it was later converted into a private house. The building is in Tudor Revival style, and is recorded in the National Heritage List for England as a designated Grade II listed building.

== History ==
The lodge was built in 1870 for Sir Richard Brooke, 7th Baronet of Norton Priory, at the northeast entrance to the estate surrounding his country house, Norton Priory. The country house was demolished in 1928, and the lodge has been converted for use as a private house.

== Architecture ==
Red Lodge has an irregular cruciform plan and is in Tudor Revival style. It is in two storeys, the lower storey being in sandstone, and the upper storey in timber framing and painted brick. The house has a red-tiled roof, and each front has a gabled and jettied upper floor. The entrance is on the east side, and has a porch with a lean-to tiled roof. The windows are mullioned. There are two chimney stacks, the one to the west containing a decorative panel with the initials "R. B." and the date 1870.

Around the lodge is wrought iron fencing with gates. On the south side is a pair of sandstone gate piers. These have rounded tops and are decorated with chevrons. Between the piers are a carriage gate and a separate pedestrian gate.

== Appraisal ==
The lodge was designated as a Grade II listed building on 28 August 2013. Grade II is the lowest of the three gradings, and is applied to buildings that "are nationally important and of special interest". The boundary fencing and gate piers and gates are included in the listing. The reasons given for its listing are because of its historical and architectural interest, and for its group value with other listed buildings on the Norton Priory Estate.

== See also ==
- Listed buildings in Runcorn (urban area)
