= St Mary's Church, Halton =

Coordinates: 53.3320°N 2.6963°W

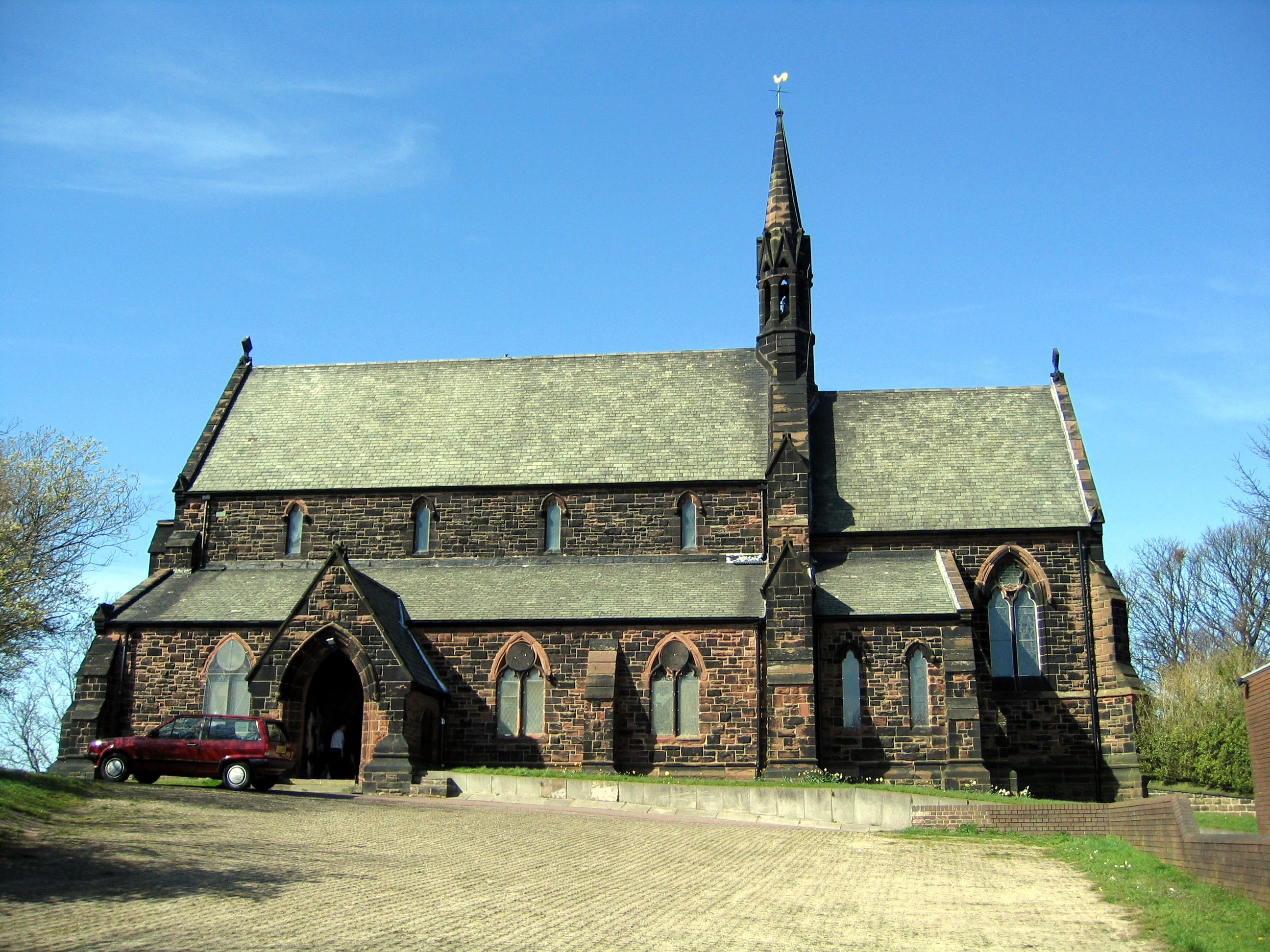
- St Mary's Church, Halton, from the south

- Location in Cheshire
- OS grid reference: SJ 5373 8192
- Location: Halton, Runcorn, Cheshire
- Country: England
- Denomination: Anglican
- Website: St Mary, Halton

History
- Status: Parish church
- Consecrated: 1852

Architecture
- Functional status: Active
- Heritage designation: Grade II
- Designated: 23 April 1970
- Architect: Sir George Gilbert Scott
- Architectural type: Church
- Style: Gothic Revival
- Completed: 1852; 174 years ago

Specifications
- Materials: Red sandstone, slate roof

Administration
- Province: York
- Diocese: Chester
- Archdeaconry: Chester
- Deanery: Frodsham
- Parish: St Mary, Halton

Clergy
- Vicar: Revd Simon Skidmore (2024-)

St Mary's Church is in Halton, which was formerly a separate village, but is now part of the town of Runcorn, Cheshire, England. It is an active Anglican parish church in the diocese of Chester, the archdeaconry of Chester and the deanery of Frodsham. The church is recorded in the National Heritage List for England as a designated Grade II listed building.

== History ==
A chapel had been associated with Halton Castle for many centuries but by the end of the Civil War it was in ruins. It had been situated just below the castle walls, a plain, square building with a bellcote on its eastern gable. Its repair was beyond the financial means of the congregation and a petition was made to the bishop for funds. Enough money was provided to rebuild the chapel and this remained in use until the middle of the 19th century. By 1847 the roof was in need of a major repair and within four years it was decided that a new church was needed. The money for this was provided by Sir Richard Brooke of Norton Priory. Sir George Gilbert Scott was appointed as the architect, and the church was consecrated on 12 November 1852. Halton had formerly been a chapel of ease to the parish church of Runcorn, but in June 1860 it became a separate parish.

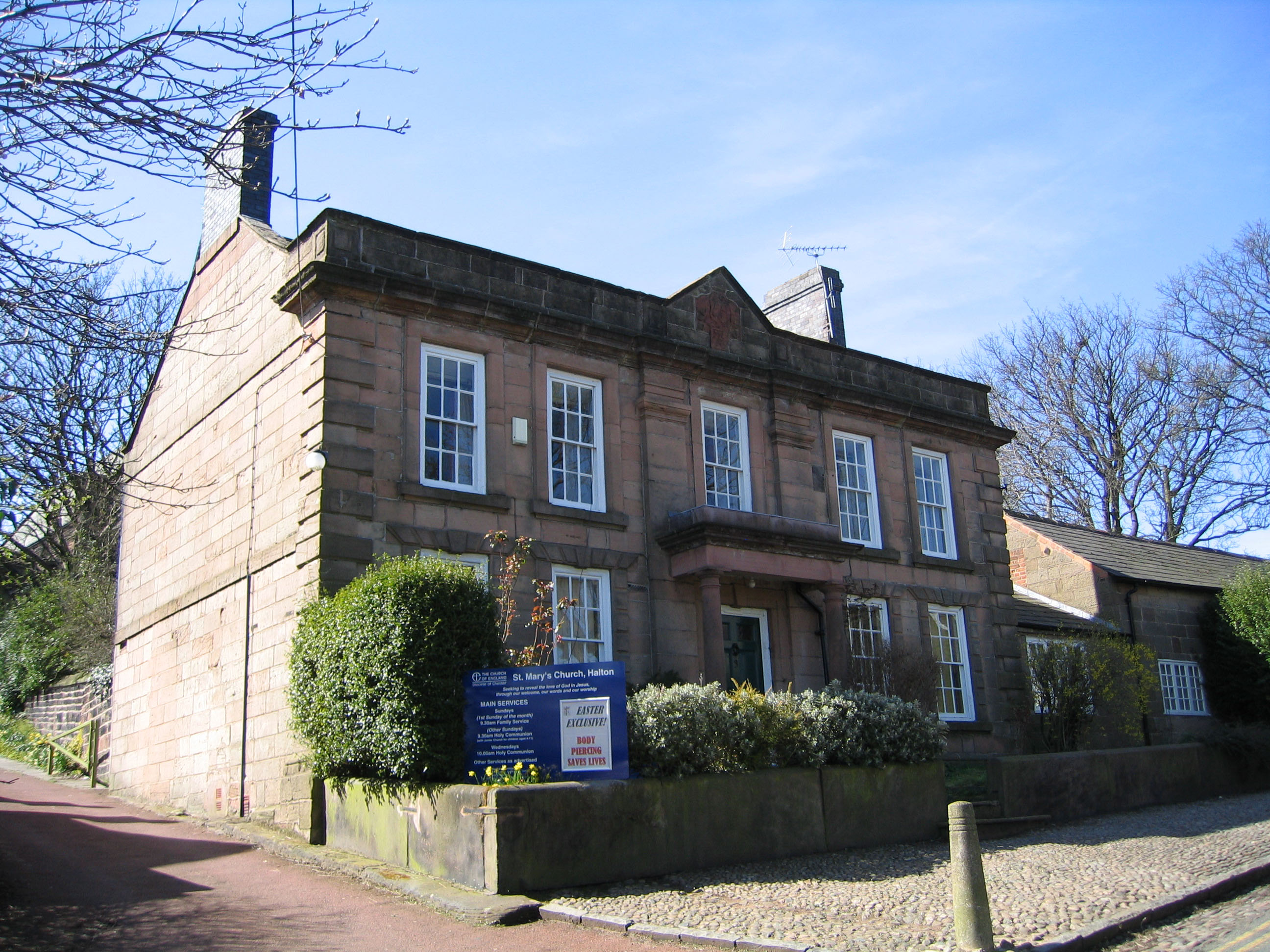
Halton Vicarage

Sir John Chesshyre, a wealthy lawyer, funded the construction of the neighbouring vicarage in 1739 and also the Chesshyre Library in 1733 to serve the incumbent and other "gentlemen or persons of letters". Today the library serves as a meeting room attached to the church hall.

== Architecture ==
=== Exterior ===
The church is built in local red sandstone with a slate roof. Its plan consists of a four-bay nave with north and south aisles, a south porch and a chancel which has its roof at a lower level. On the east gable of the nave is an octagonal bell-turret. To the north of the chancel is the organ chamber and to its south is a memorial chapel.

=== Interior ===
Wagon roofs cover the nave and the chancel. The reredos is of marble. The oak benches are carved with poppyheads. The stained glass in the west window probably dates from the 1850s, and is probably by David Evans. A stained glass window in the north aisle dating from about 1893 is by Henry Holiday and depicts Christ and the children. There is also a window dating from about 1912 by George Wragge depicting the Good Samaritan. A monument to Sir Richard Brooke dated 1889 by Douglas and Fordham consists of a tablet with a stylized cross in a foliage frame.

== See also ==
- List of new churches by George Gilbert Scott in Northern England
- Listed buildings in Runcorn (urban area)
