= Town Park, Runcorn =

Urban park in England

Town Park
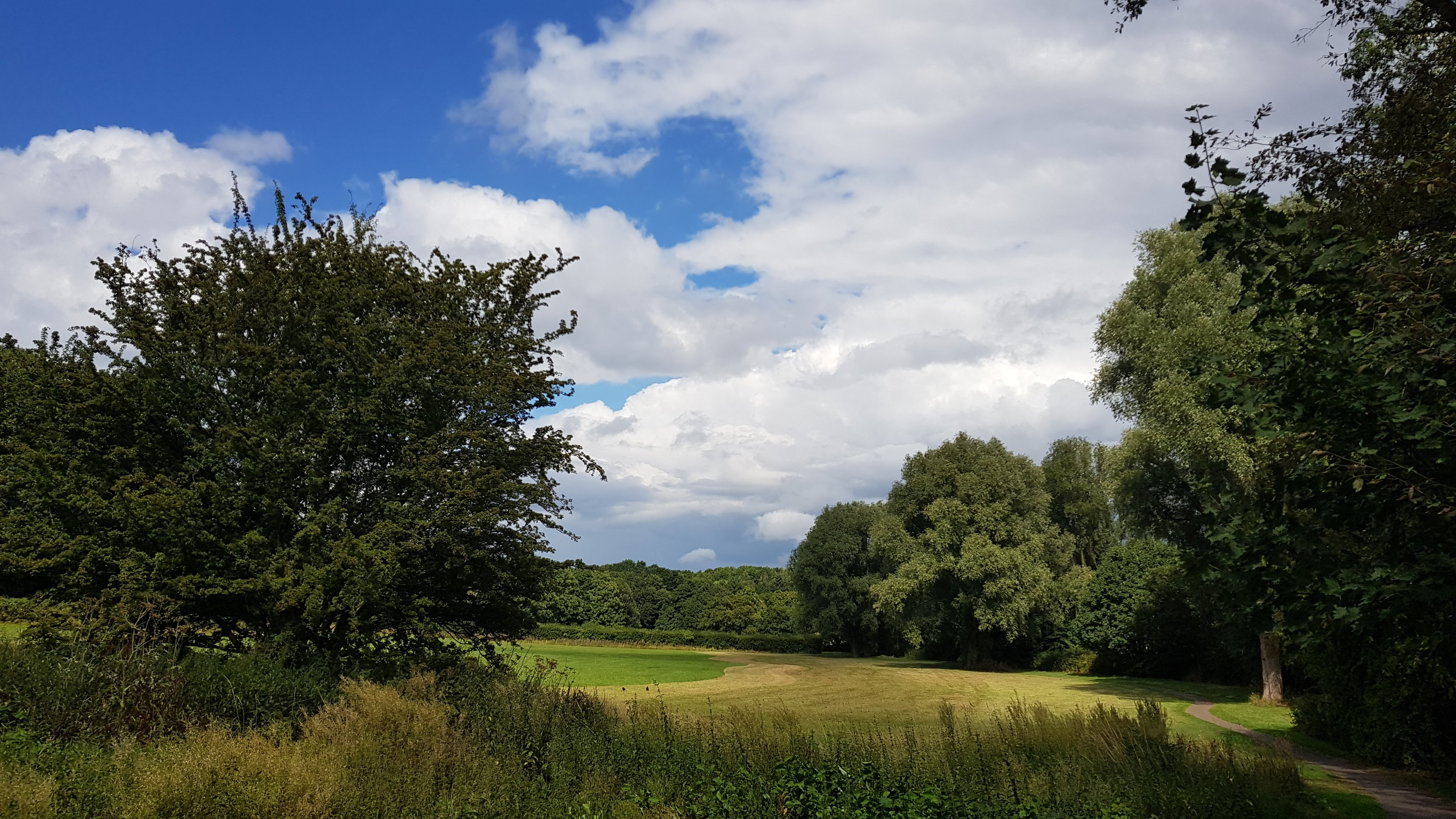
- Interactive map of Town Park
- Type: Urban park
- Location: Runcorn, Cheshire, England
- Coordinates: 53.3297°N 2.6814°W
- Area: 157 hectares (1.57 km^{2})
- Operator: Halton Borough Council
- Website: visit.halton.me/project/town-park/

Town Park is a large urban park in Runcorn, Cheshire, England.

Town Park was created as an integral part of the original Runcorn New Town development with the aim of forming a central landscape feature for local residents. The creation of Town Park preserved nearly 157 hectares of existing woodlands and undulating grassland. The park was planned to link the New Town centre with local centres via green corridors and included large areas of open grassland and woodland as well as buildings for recreational and cultural activities.

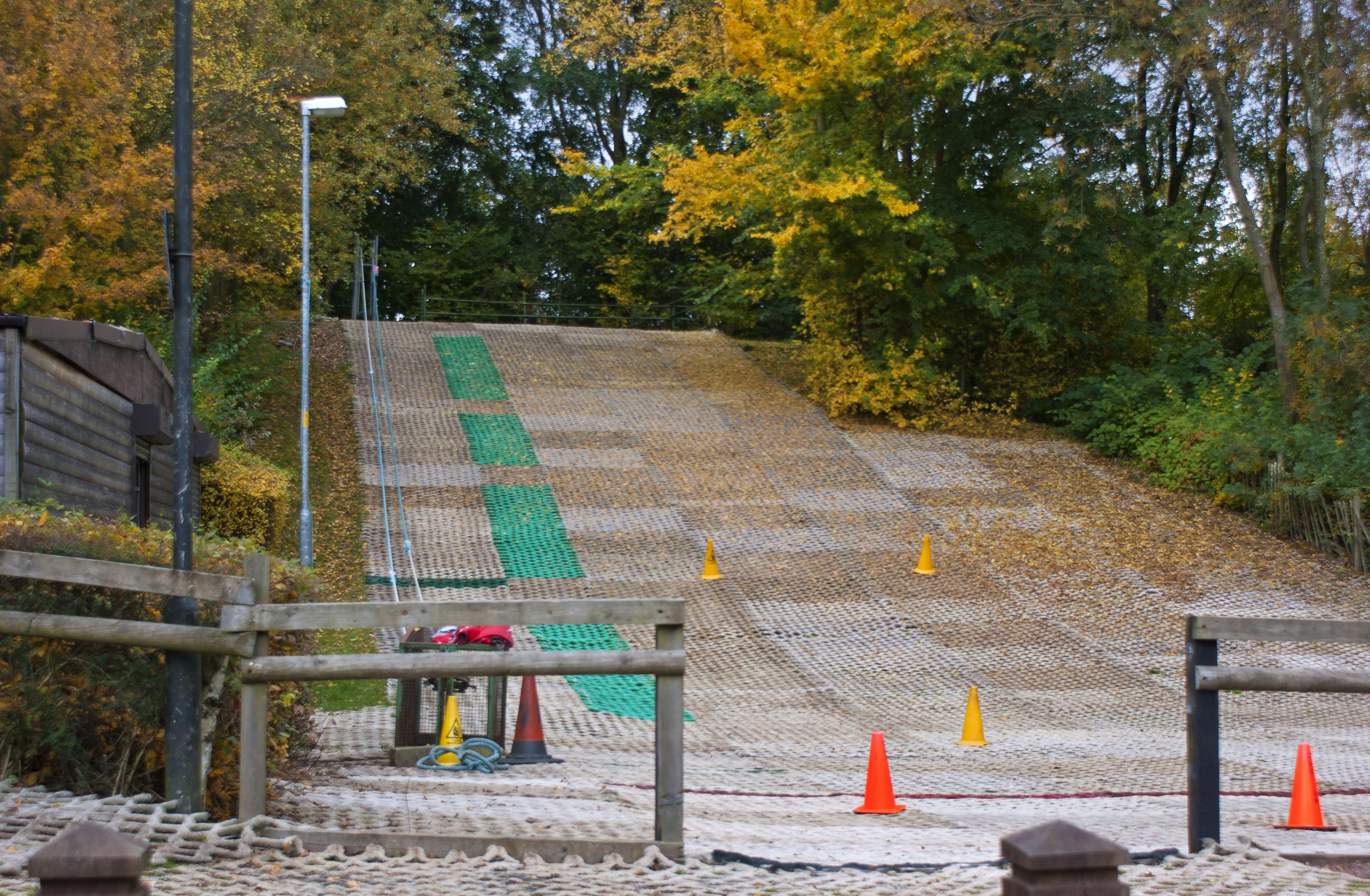
Runcorn Ski Slope

Halton Miniature Railway (opened in 1979), Runcorn Ski Slope and Norton Priory Museum and Gardens sit within the park boundaries.

In July 2010, a new play area was created at Stockham Lane adjacent to the miniature railway. From July 2017, the park was staffed with two full time park workers for the first time since the early 1990s, funded by the Viridor Runcorn Energy from Waste plant. In 2018, the Council adopted a Masterplan for Town Park which would see footpaths widened and three themed hubs created across the park.
