= Chesshyre Library =

Former library in Halton Village, Cheshire, England

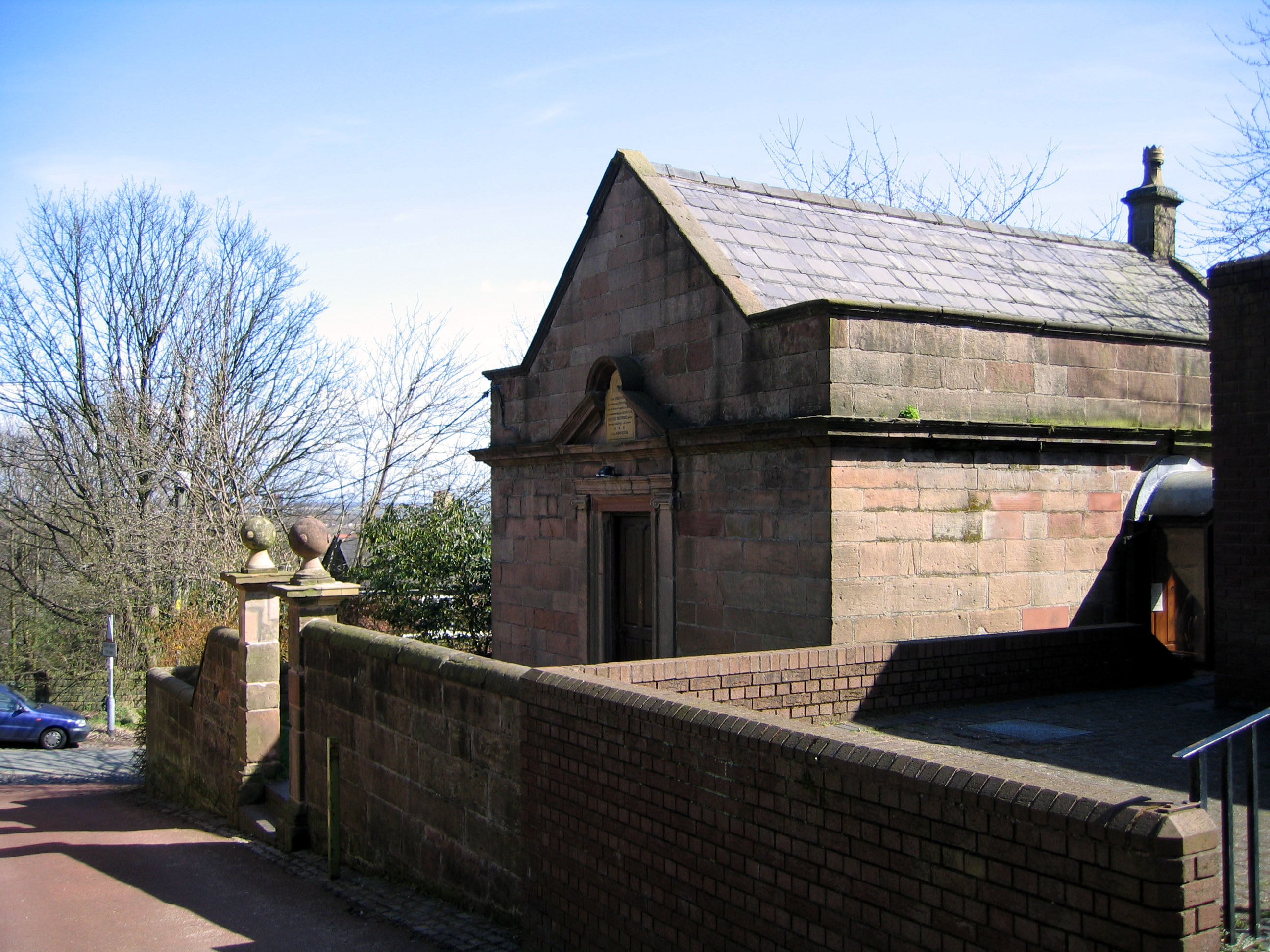
- Exterior of Chesshyre Library and gateposts
- 53.3319°N 2.6955°W
- Location: Halton, Runcorn, Cheshire, United Kingdom
- Type: Public library
- Established: 1733

Collection
- Items collected: Theology, law, Latin literature, Ancient Greek literature, magazines
- Size: 422 volumes

Access and use
- Access requirements: "divines of the Church of England or other gentlemen or persons of letters"
- Parent organisation: St Mary's Church, Halton

Listed Building – Grade II*
- Designated: 20 October 1952
- Reference no.: 1115560

Chesshyre Library, founded in 1733 by Sir John Chesshyre, was one of the earliest free public libraries in England. It is now a meeting room attached to St Mary's Church Hall in Halton, Runcorn, Cheshire.

== History ==
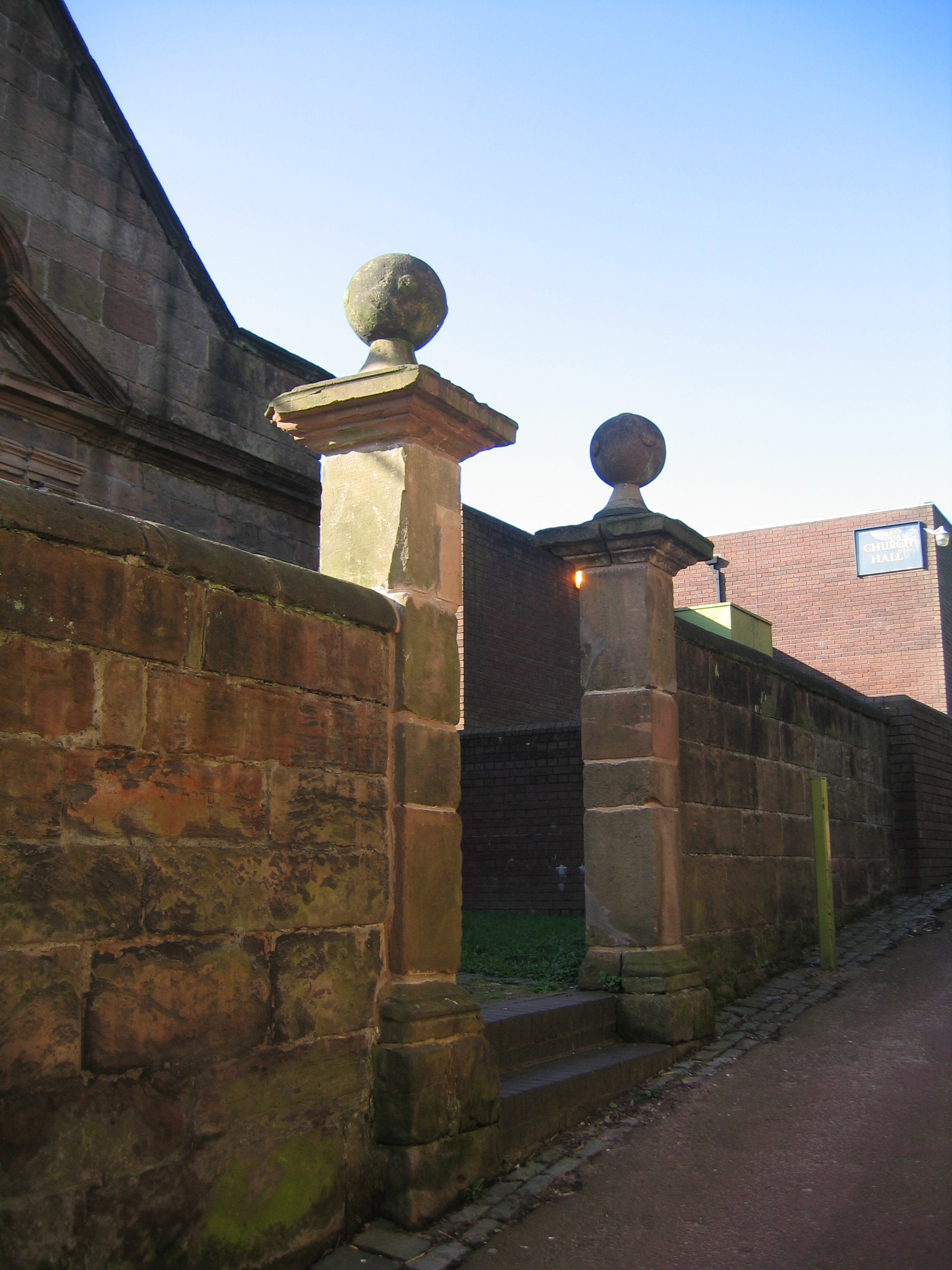
The grade II listed gates to Chesshyre Library

In 1733 Sir John Chesshyre, a wealthy lawyer, built one of the earliest free libraries in England at Halton and left an endowment in his will for its maintenance. The building, probably to a design by Francis Smith, was largely completed by 1730. But the ill health of Chesshyre's brother, Robert, who was overseeing the works delayed its opening. The library had 400 books when it opened which were mainly ecclesiastical histories and works of law. The library was intended for the incumbent of Halton and "for any divine or divines of the Church of England or other gentlemen or persons of letters" and was to be accessible every Tuesday and Thursday. Chesshyre also built the vicarage in Halton in 1739 and endowed the curacy there.

The endowment proved insufficient for maintenance and by the middle of the nineteenth century it had no function and no money. By the middle of the twentieth century the building was in an advanced state of dilapidation. In 1940 the books and original catalogue were sent to Stockport Museum for safekeeping due to their poor condition. But ten years later the Manchester Guardian reported that the museum had lost the vellum catalogue. Chesshyre's entry in the 1887 Dictionary of National Biography, however, records that the library contains mostly theology and also the Statutes at Large, Thomas Rymer's Foedera, William Dugdale's Monasticon, and some Greek and Latin classics.

== Present day ==
The church land adjacent to the library was acquired by the North-West Water Authority and a new parish hall was built in 1976 with money received as compensation. A passageway was made to link the new hall with the library which now serves as a meeting room. The library is recorded in the National Heritage List for England as a designated Grade II* listed building, and its gates are listed at Grade II.
