= John Chesshyre =

English lawyer

Sir John Chesshyre
- Born: 11 November 1662; Halton, Cheshire, England
- Died: 15 May 1738 (aged 75); London
- Education: Gray's Inn
- Occupation: Lawyer
- Title: Knight
- Parent(s): Thomas and Catherine; Chesshyre

Sir John Chesshyre (11 November 1662 – 15 May 1738) was an English lawyer who rose to the position of king's first serjeant.

== Family background ==
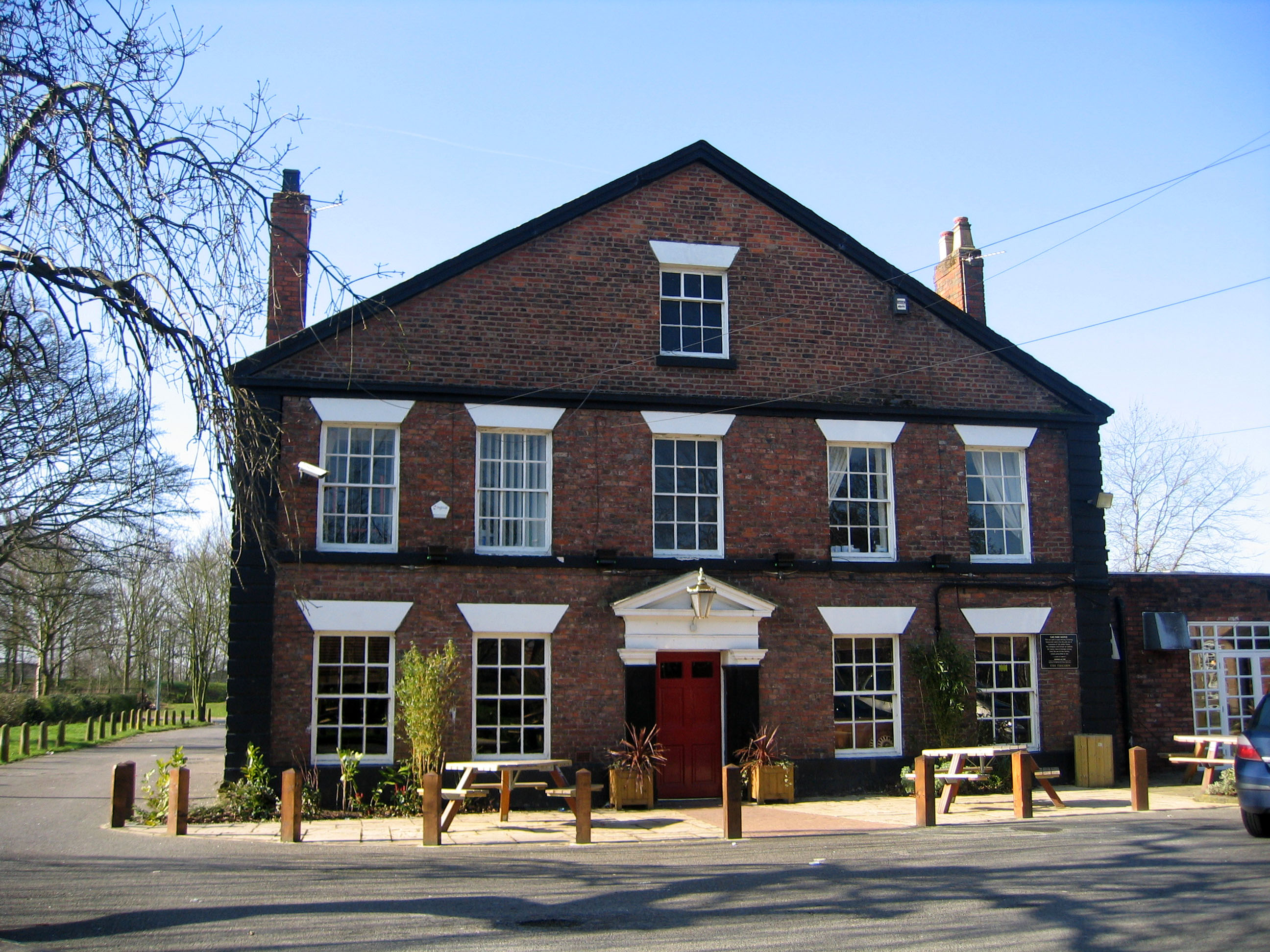
Hallwood, Chesshyre's birthplace

Sir John Chesshyre was born at Hallwood, Runcorn, Cheshire, the son of Thomas and Catherine Chesshyre. Thomas Chesshyre was Bailiff of the Lordship of Halton and Whitley. The family had been Royalists in the Civil War and they had sustained severe financial penalties when the Parliamentarians were ruling the country.

== Legal career ==
John Chesshyre was admitted to Gray's Inn in 1682 and called to the bar there in 1689. In 1705 he accepted the degree of serjeant-at-law. He became one of the crown counsel as queen's sergeant in 1711 and was knighted in 1713. In 1727, he was declared the king's first serjeant. His profession made him a wealthy man; in the six years from 1719 he earned an average income of over £3,000 a year, making him one of the highest earning counsels practising in Westminster Hall. In 1725, he reduced his practice, confining it to the Court of Common Pleas, thus reducing his annual income to an average of £1,300.

== Personal life ==
For most of his professional life he lived in London, either in his house in Isleworth, which was then in Middlesex, or in his other home in Essex Street, off the Strand, or in his chambers in the Inner Temple. His death in 1738 was sudden and the Gentleman's Magazine stated that he "was worth £100,000 all acquired by the Law". He had expressed a wish to be buried in Runcorn parish church but he wanted "no lying in state nor pompous train of coaches into Cheshire nor any unnecessary attendance". Nevertheless, his funeral procession took five days to travel from Isleworth to Runcorn and his funeral expenses amounted to over £350. There is a monument to his memory in Runcorn parish church but this is now out of sight behind the organ. His papers are deposited at Chetham's Library, Manchester.

Sir John's first wife died in London in 1705 and was buried in Runcorn. In 1706 he married Ann Lawley who outlived him to die in 1756. His brother, Robert Chesshyre, was vicar of Runcorn and he died in 1739.

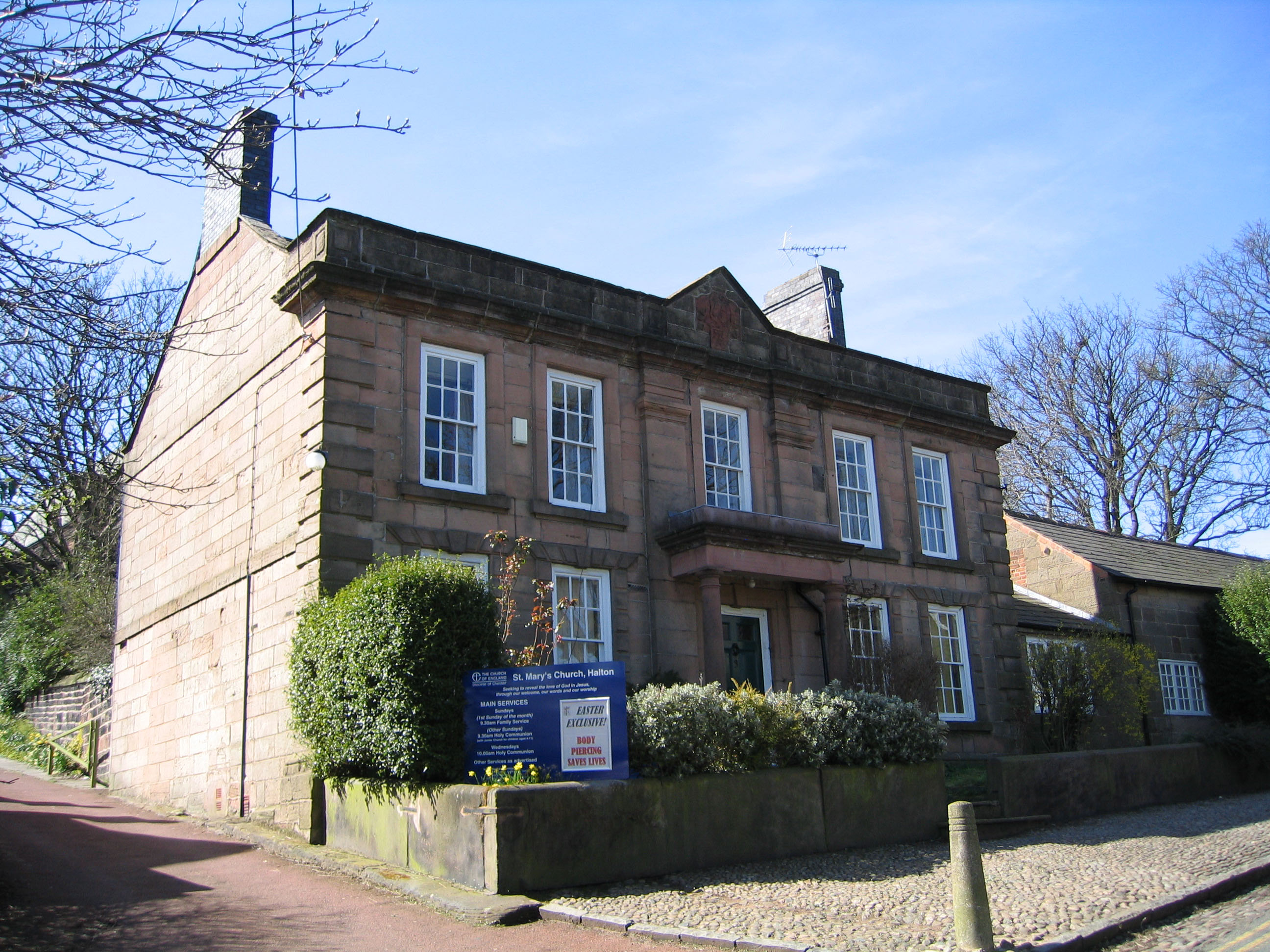
Halton Vicarage

== Chesshyre Library ==
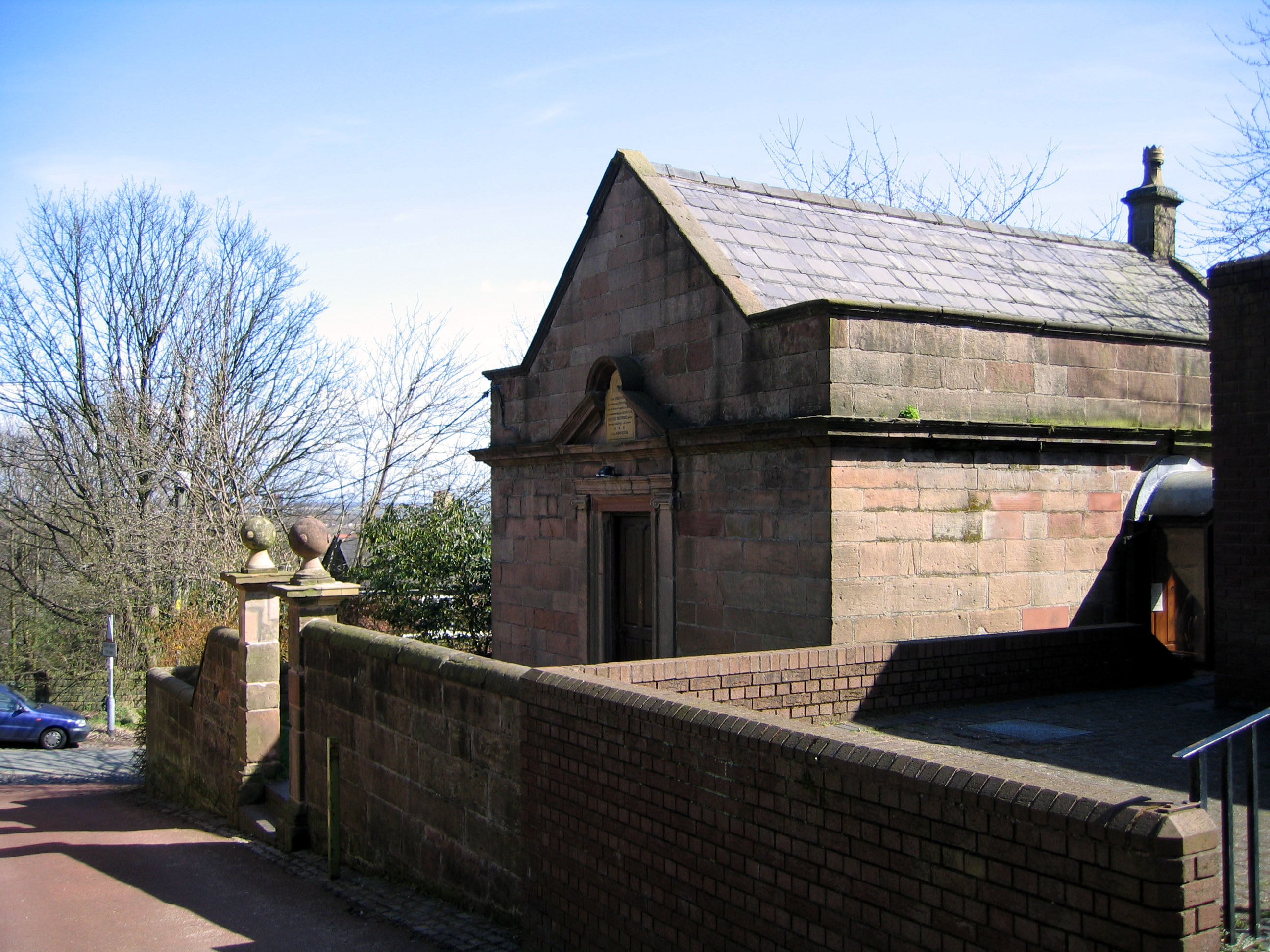
Chesshyre Library

In 1733, Chesshyre built one of the earliest free libraries in England at Halton and left an endowment in his will for its maintenance. The library had 400 books which were mainly ecclesiastical histories and works of law. The library was intended for the incumbent of Halton and "for any divine or divines of the Church of England or other gentlemen or persons of letters". Chesshyre also built the vicarage in Halton in 1739 and endowed the curacy there.

== See also ==
- Listed buildings in Runcorn (urban area)
