= Halton, Runcorn =

Former village in Cheshire, UK; part of the town of Runcorn

Coordinates: 53.331°N 2.694°W

Halton
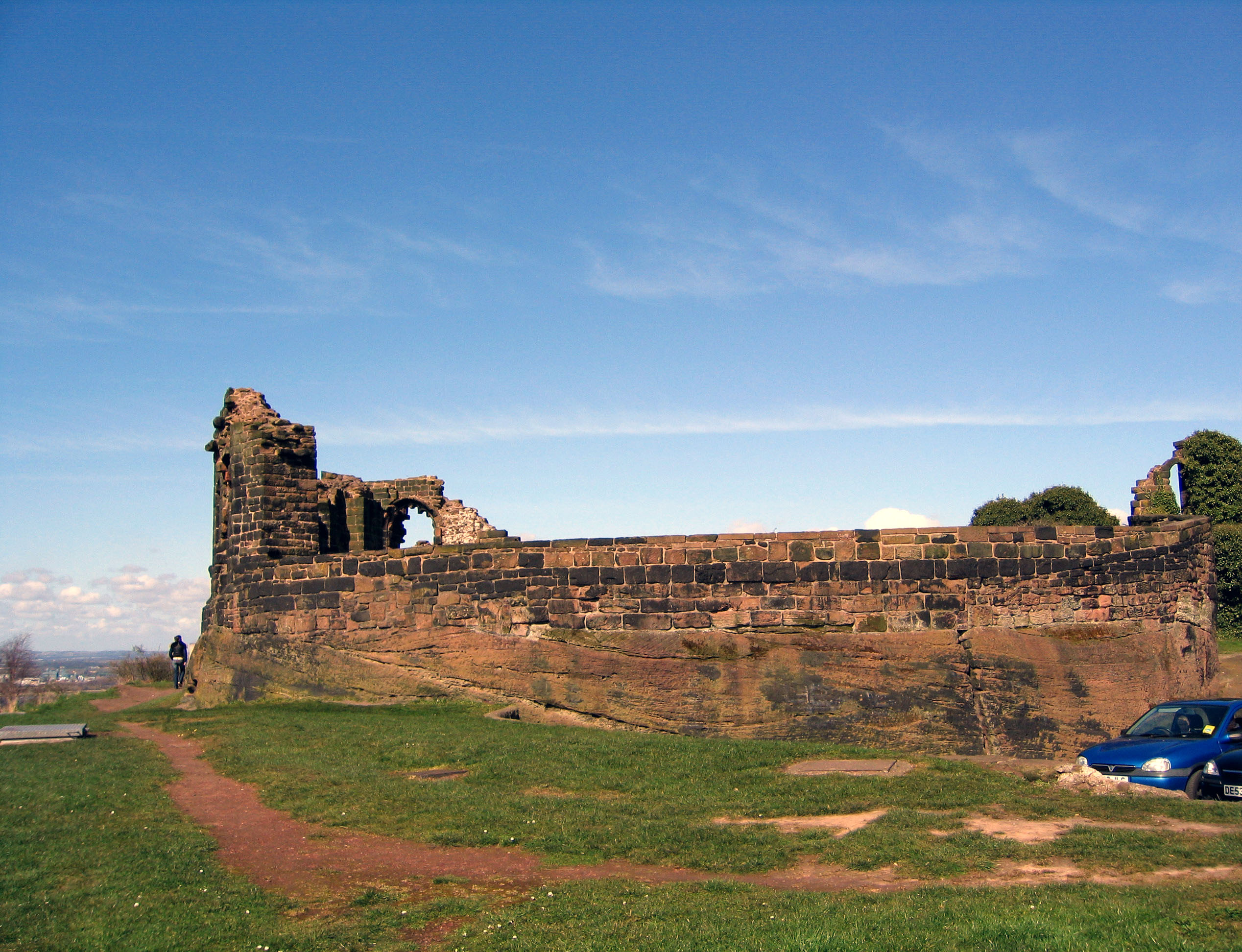
- Part of the ruins of Halton Castle

- Location within Cheshire
- Unitary authority: Halton
- Ceremonial county: Cheshire
- Region: North West
- Country: England
- Sovereign state: United Kingdom

Halton, formerly a separate village, is now part of the town of Runcorn, Cheshire, England. The name Halton has been assumed by the Borough of Halton, which includes Runcorn, Widnes, and some outlying parishes.

== History ==
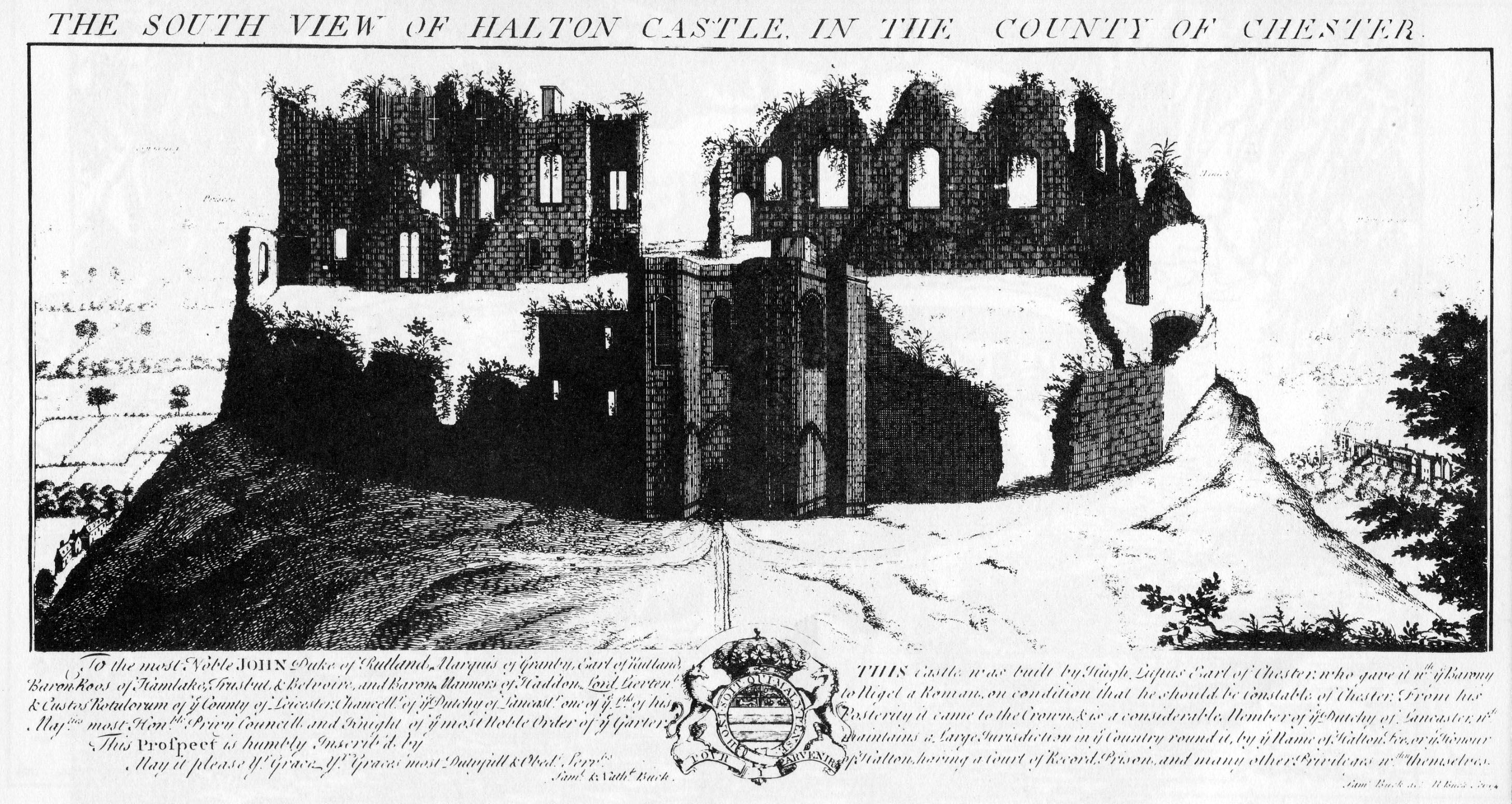
Halton Castle in 1727. Engraving by the Buck brothers

There is evidence of human occupation in the Stone Age and during the Roman era. The village is recorded in the Domesday Book (1086) in the hundred of Tunendune. Towards the end of the 11th century, the first castle, which became the seat of the Barons of Halton, was built on the hill. The Tunendune hundred court was absorbed into Bucklow hundred by 1260 so government statistics for Halton over many later centuries are indexed by Bucklow hundred.

During the medieval period, a deer park measuring 100 acres (40 ha) lay to the south and the west of the village. At this time, Halton had a weekly market and annual fair. The village held a court leet and the castle was used as a prison. During the Civil War, the castle was held by the Royalists and twice besieged by Parliamentary forces. Following this the castle fell into ruin. The importance of Halton declined with the coming of the Industrial Revolution and the development of the chemical and other industries in Runcorn.

Halton was formerly a township and chapelry in the parish of Runcorn. In 1866, Halton became a separate civil parish. On 1 April 1967, the parish was abolished and merged with Runcorn.

== Geography ==
The village stands in an elevated position at 240 feet (73 m) compared with the surrounding area which lies at about 100 feet (30 m). At its centre is an outcrop of sandstone which rises to a height of 252.6 feet (77 m). On the summit of the outcrop are the ruins of Halton Castle. The major road, Main Street, passes below the castle, to its west and south, and Castle Road leads up to the castle.

== Demography ==
Population statistics were recorded separately for the parish of Halton until the village was incorporated into its larger neighbour under the Runcorn New Town (Designation) Order 1964.

The population of Halton Village in 1664 has been estimated as 375. In 1961, the parish had a population of 1,467.

Population growth of Halton Village since 1801
1801	1811	1821	1831	1841	1851	1861	1871	1881	1891	1901	1911	1921	1931	1951	1961
628	894	1,066	1,322	1,397	1,570	1,505	1,620	1,439	1,555	1,238	1,294	1,508	1,694	1,490	1,467

== Today ==
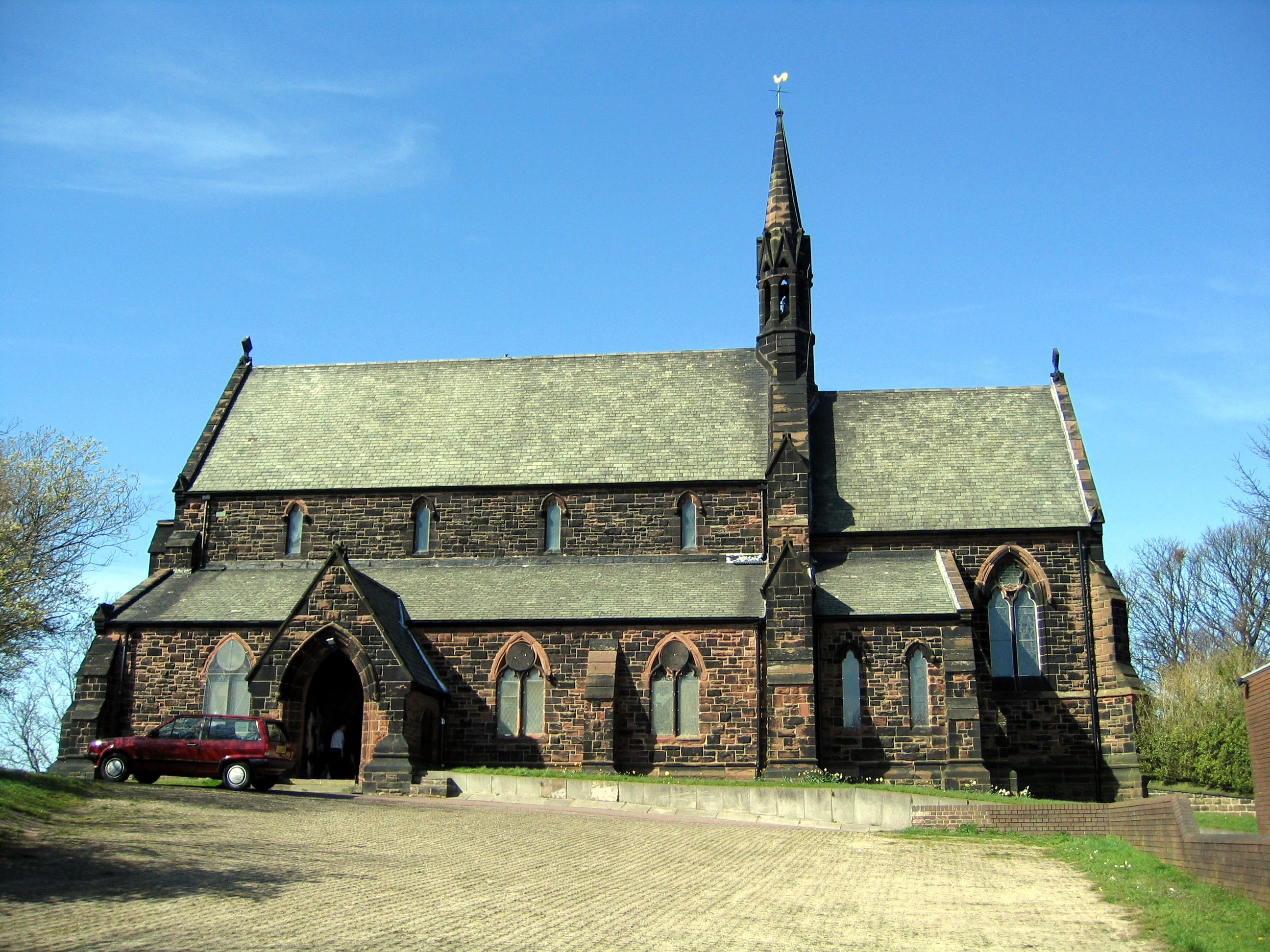
St Mary's Church

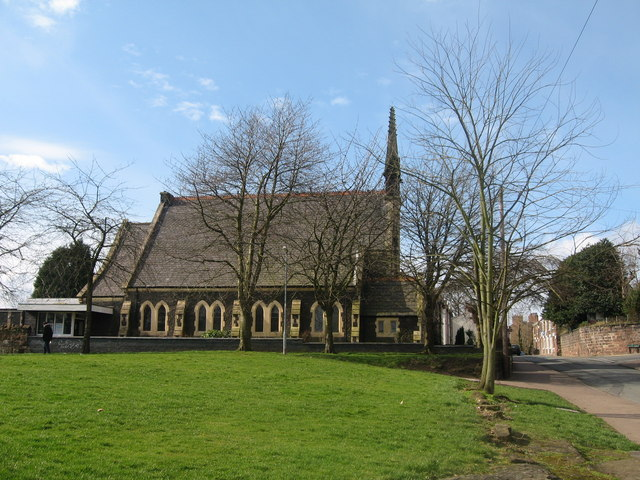
Halton Trinity Methodist Church

The village is now entirely residential, surrounded to the west and north by the estates of Runcorn New Town. To the south is Halton Lea, a shopping mall, and other retail and entertainment outlets. To the east is Town Park. The castle is a Grade I listed building and a scheduled ancient monument, and there are a number of other listed buildings in the village. There are two public houses, the Castle Hotel, which is incorporated into the structure of the castle and which contains the former courthouse, and the Norton Arms. In the village are two active churches, the Anglican Church of St Mary and Trinity Methodist Church. The Village has a Millennium Green, one of a series of 245 charity-run public green spaces created at the turn of the millennium.

== Notable connections ==
- Edith Smith (1876–1923), first female police officer in the United Kingdom with full power of arrest, is buried in Halton cemetery.

== See also ==
- Listed buildings in Runcorn (urban area)
