= Greenhalgh =

Greenhalgh (/ˈɡriːnhælʃ, -hɒlʃ, -hældʒ, -hɔː(l)/) is an English surname.

Notable people with the surname include:

- A. H. Greenhalgh, Democratic assemblyman from Nevada
- Ben Greenhalgh (born 1992), English footballer
- Brian Greenhalgh (born 1947), English footballer
- Chris Greenhalgh (born 1963), British novelist
- Eric Greenhalgh (1910–1996), English cricketer
- Harry Greenhalgh (1900–1982), English footballer
- Harwood Greenhalgh (1849–1922), English footballer
- Howard Greenhalgh (born 1963), music video director
- Jack Greenhalgh (1904–1971), American cinematographer
- James Greenhalgh (born 1975), New Zealand tennis player
- Joe Greenhalgh (born 1985), English cricketer
- John Greenhalgh (footballer) (1898–1987), English footballer
- John Greenhalgh (governor) (died 1651), of the Isle of Man
- Jimmy Greenhalgh (1923–2013), English football manager
- Karen Greenhalgh, American politician
- Laura Greenhalgh (born 1985), British rower
- Luiz Eduardo Greenhalgh, Brazilian politician
- Michael Greenhalgh (1943–2026), British art historian
- Nick Greenhalgh (born 1989), English rugby player
- Norman Greenhalgh (1914–1995), English footballer
- Paul Greenhalgh (born 1955), educator at University of East Anglia
- Ralph Greenhalgh (1899–1965), Australian footballer
- Robert Greenhalgh (born 1978), British sailor
- Sam Greenhalgh (1882–1955), English footballer
- Sean Greenhalgh (lacrosse) (born 1982), Canadian lacrosse player
- Sean Greenhalgh (musician), drummer of American rock band "Clap Your Hands Say Yeah"
- Shaun Greenhalgh (born 1960), English art forger
- Stephen Greenhalgh, Baron Greenhalgh (born 1967), British businessman and politician
- Tom Greenhalgh (born 1956), English musician with the Mekons
- Trisha Greenhalgh (born 1959), British professor of primary health care
- Victor Greenhalgh (1900–1983), Australian sculptor

Fictional characters:

- Dot Greenhalgh, Coronation Street character of the 1960s

== Variants ==
Greenall, Greenhalf /-hælf/, Greenhalge /-hældʒ/, Greenhall, Greenhaulgh /-hɔː/, Greenhaw, Greenhow.
