= Greenhalgh (disambiguation) =

Greenhalgh is a surname.

Greenhalgh may also refer to:

- Greenhalgh (F46), former Brazilian Navy frigate, originally HMS Broadsword (F88) of Royal Navy (UK)
- Greenhalgh Castle, a ruin near Garstang in Lancashire, England
- Greenhalgh, Lancashire, a village in England
- Greenhalgh Mountain, a summit in Colorado
- Greenhalgh Island, an island off the northern cost of Western Australia, Australia
