= Preston Brook =

Village in Cheshire, England

Coordinates: 53.318°N 2.654°W

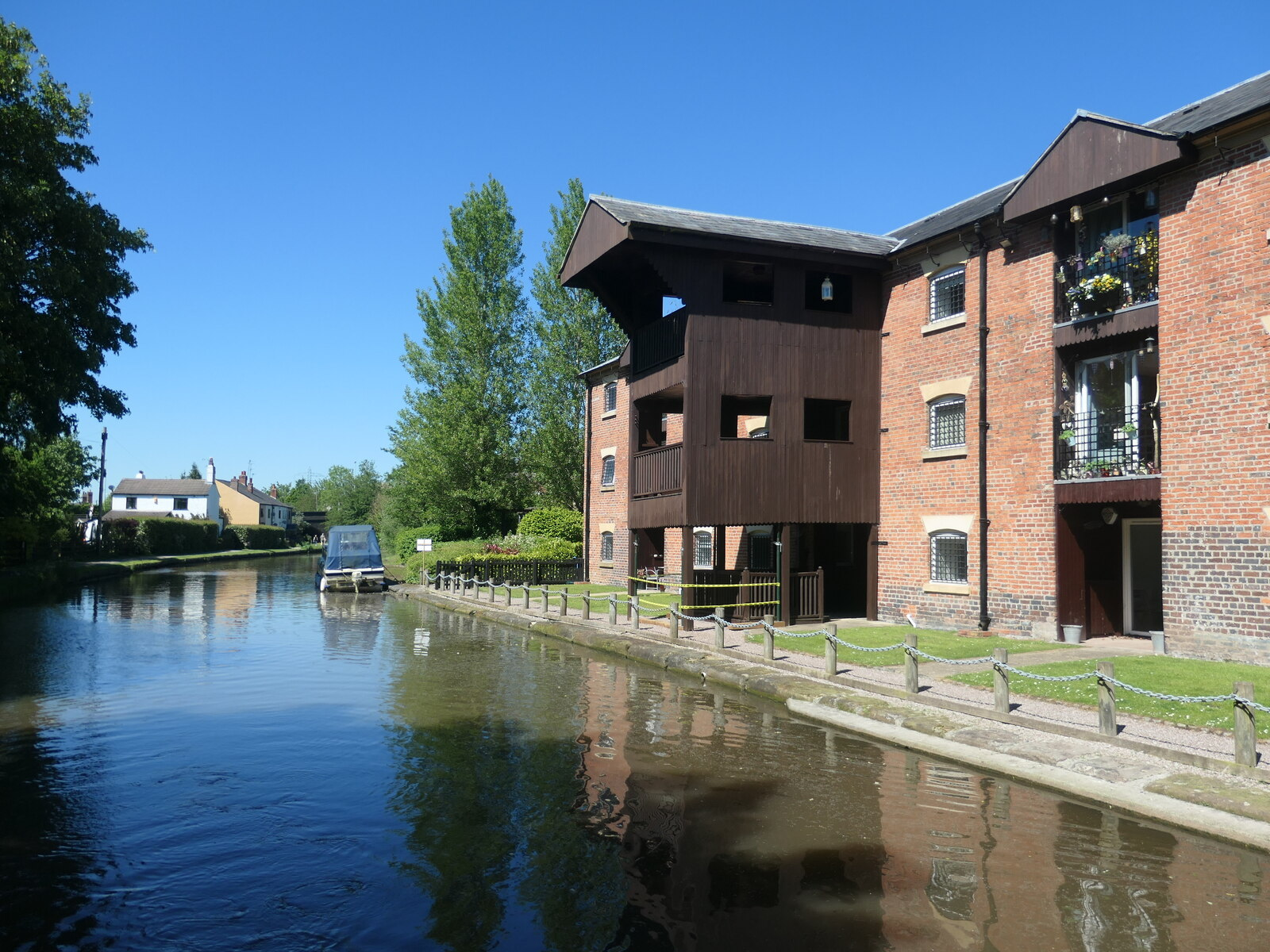
- Homes on the canal in Preston Brook

- Location within Cheshire
- Population: 7,148
- OS grid reference: SJ5881
- Civil parish: Preston Brook
- Unitary authority: Halton
- Ceremonial county: Cheshire
- Region: North West
- Country: England
- Sovereign state: United Kingdom
- Post town: RUNCORN
- Postcode district: WA7
- Dialling code: 01928
- Police: Cheshire
- Fire: Cheshire
- Ambulance: North West
- UK Parliament: Runcorn and Helsby

Preston Brook is a village and civil parish in Cheshire, England. It is situated in the borough of Halton and is bordered by the M56 motorway to the north, Dutton to the east, and Runcorn to the south and west.

== Overview ==
The village was formerly bordered to the east by the village of Preston on the Hill, which is now part of Preston Brook. The Bridgewater Canal runs from Manchester through Preston Brook, where it divides into two branches; one branch leads to Runcorn, where it used to join the Manchester Ship Canal and the River Mersey before that, while the second branch joins the Trent and Mersey Canal at the Preston Brook canal tunnel. Due to the Bridgewater Canal's dominance, many residents live on or own boathouses.

Preston Brook houses the Abbots Park industrial estate, which was formerly used by ScottishPower and is now used by Capita, DHL, FirstGroup, Mammoet, Marks & Spencer, O2, Rotex Global, Tesco Mobile, and Wincanton Logistics. The community has a website and bi-monthly newsletter. It is home to E-scape, the UK's first dedicated off-roading track for electric vehicles. It is in the constituency of Runcorn and Helsby, which has been represented by Sarah Pochin of Reform UK since the 2025 Runcorn and Helsby by-election.

== Demographics ==
The population was 7,148 at the 2021 Census, up from 809 in 2011. 96.2% of the population was recorded as White and the remaining percentage was split between mixed or multiple ethnic groups (1.9%); Asian, Asian British, or Asian Welsh (1%); other (0.6%); and Black, Black British, Black Welsh, Caribbean, or African (0.2%). 52.9% of the population was recorded as Christian and 41.3% declared no religion whilst 4.5% declined to answer, with the remaining percentage split between 0.7% Muslim, 0.3% other, 0.2% Hindu, and 0.1% Buddhist, in addition to two Sikhs and one Jew.

Approximately 2,860 people were employed in the area as of 2021, with the most prevalent careers being in retail and motor repair (17.3%), human health and social work (16.7%), manufacturing (10.2%), transport and storage (7.9%), and administrative work (6.4%). 51.1% of the population drove to work whilst 24.2% worked mainly from home, with 7.6% walking to work and 7.1% taking public transport. Of the population aged 16 years and over, 25.2% had no qualifications and 19% had Level 4 qualifications (Note: Corresponding to the first year of a bachelor's degree.) or above whilst 18% had Level 3 qualifications (Note: Corresponding to A-Levels.) or above. 15.1% of the population was recorded as being considered disabled under the Equality Act 2010.

== Gallery ==
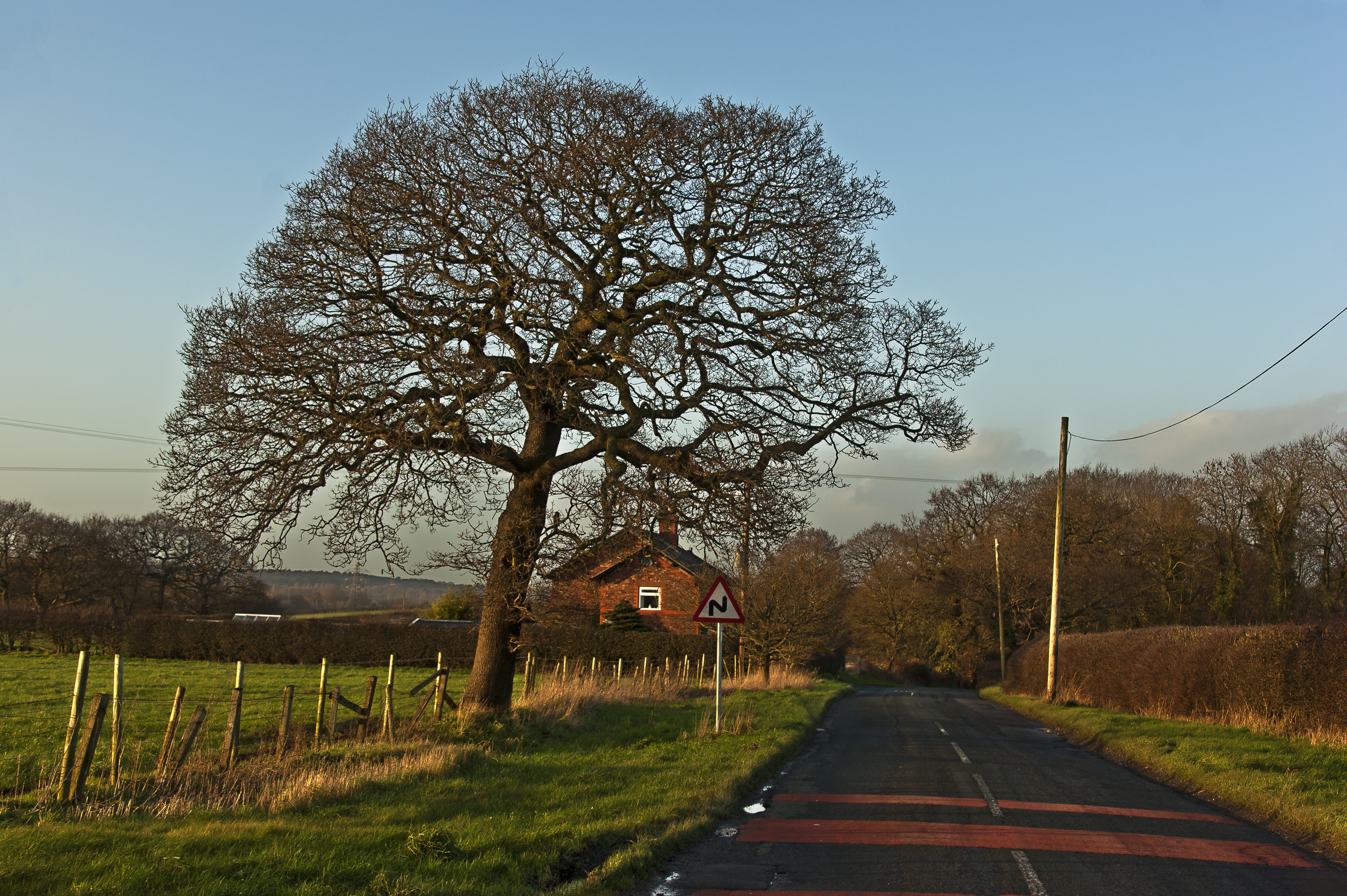
Barker's Hollow Road

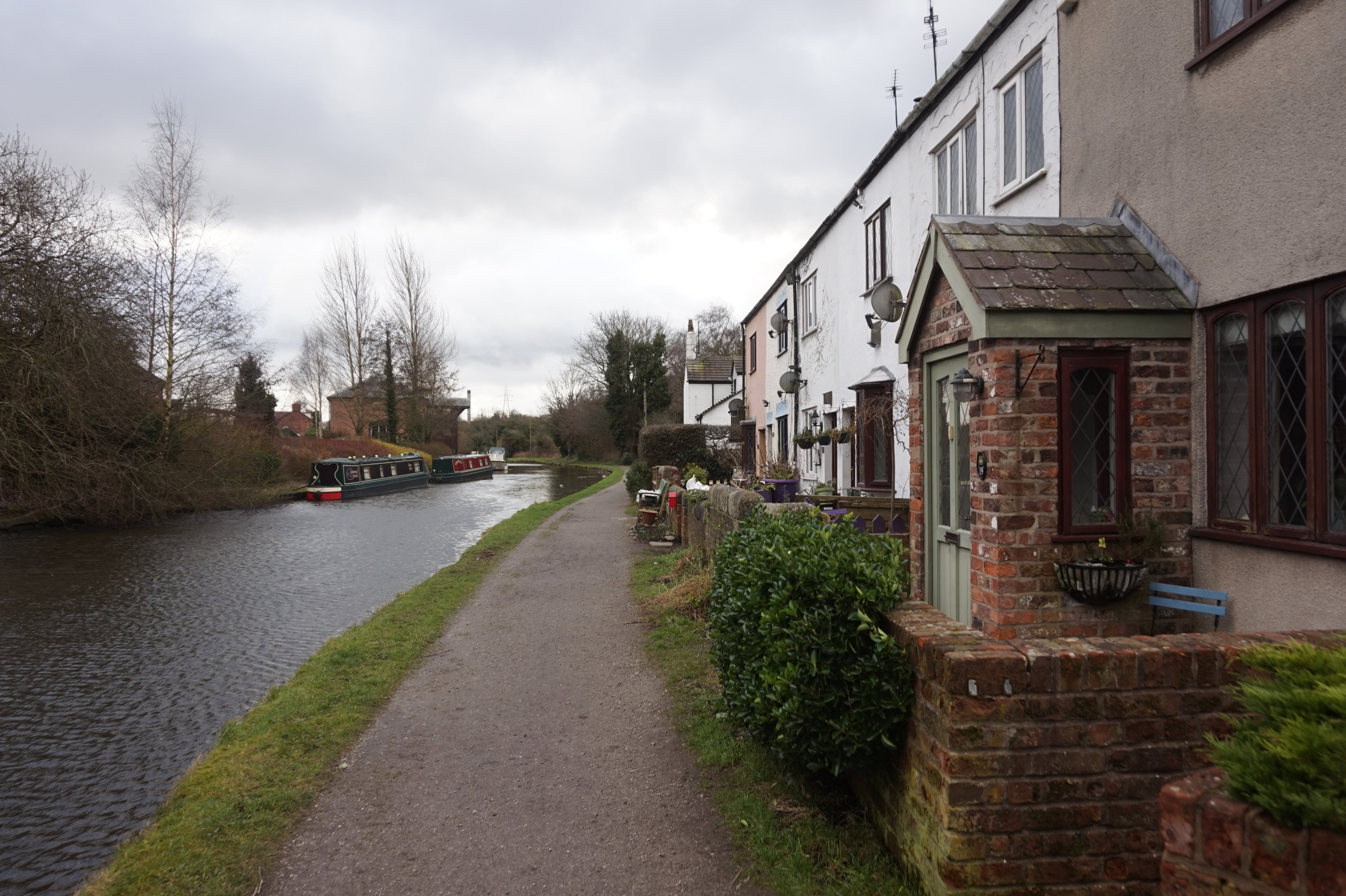
Homes and houseboats on the canal

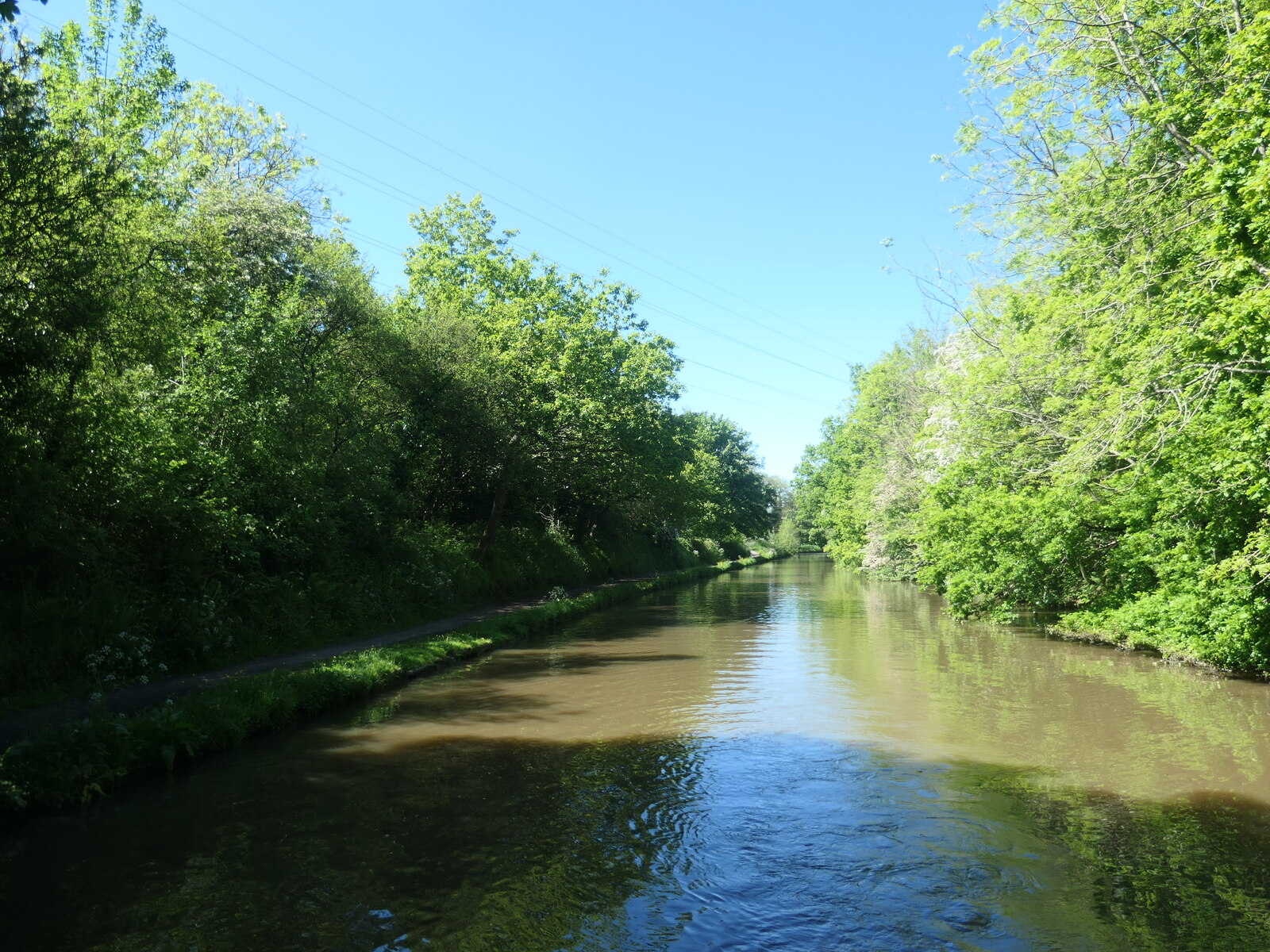
Further up the canal

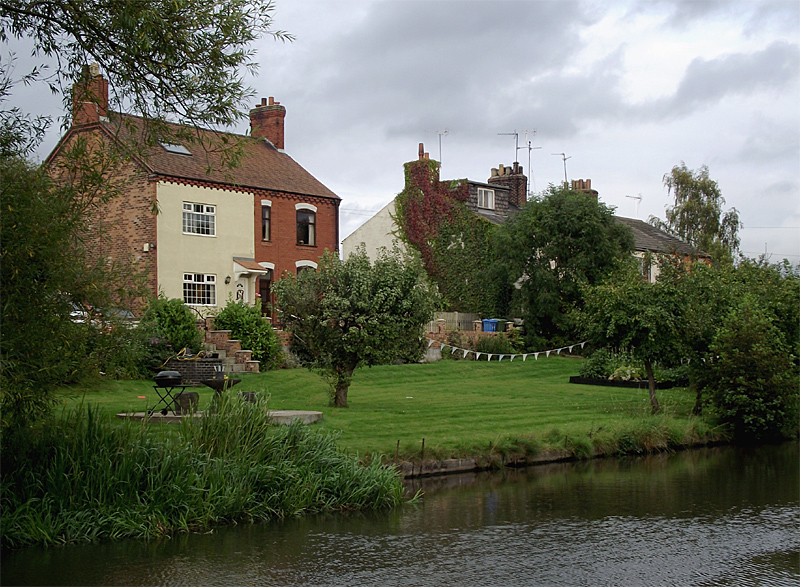
Homes on the canal

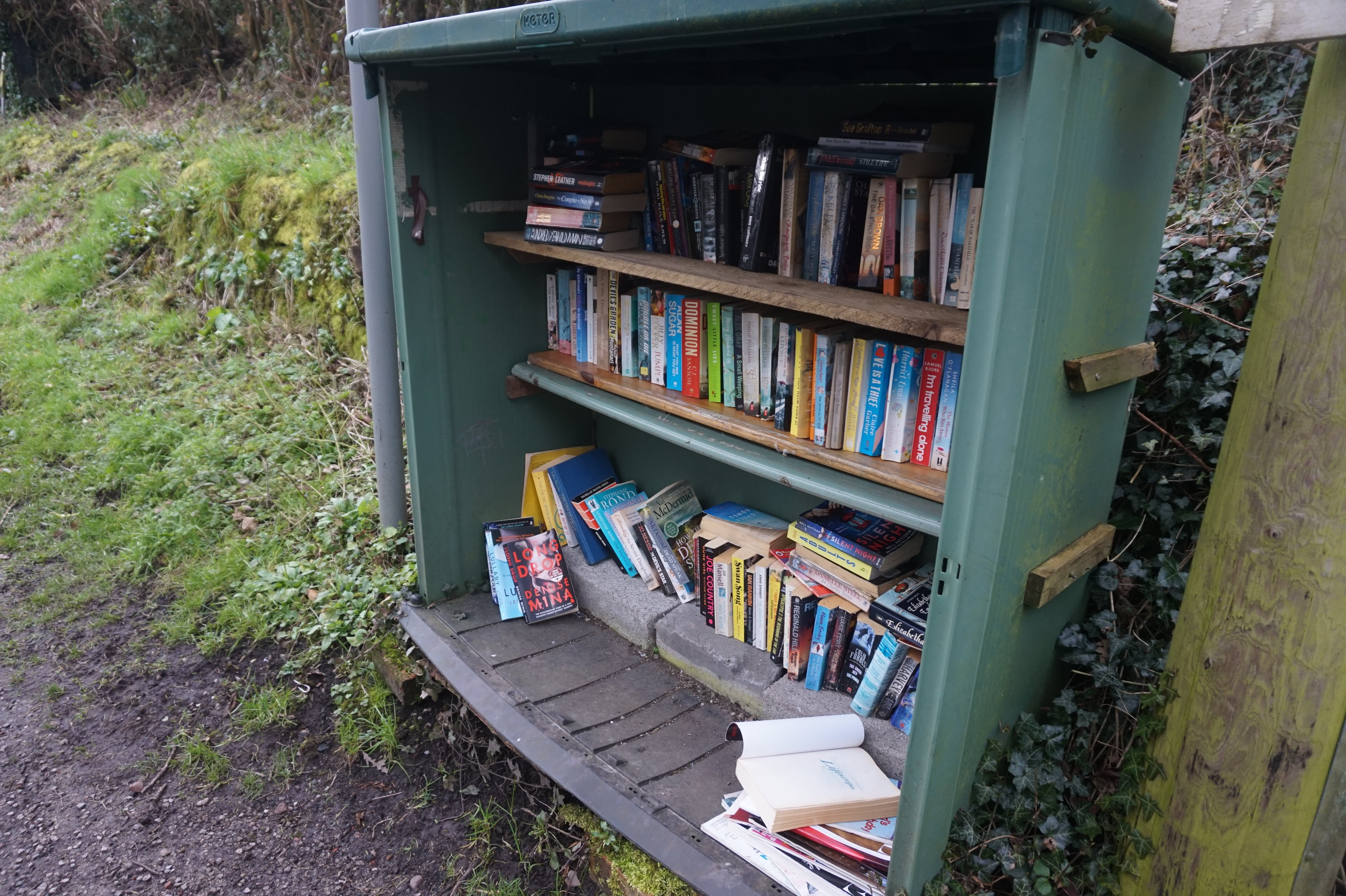
A free bookshare in Preston Brook

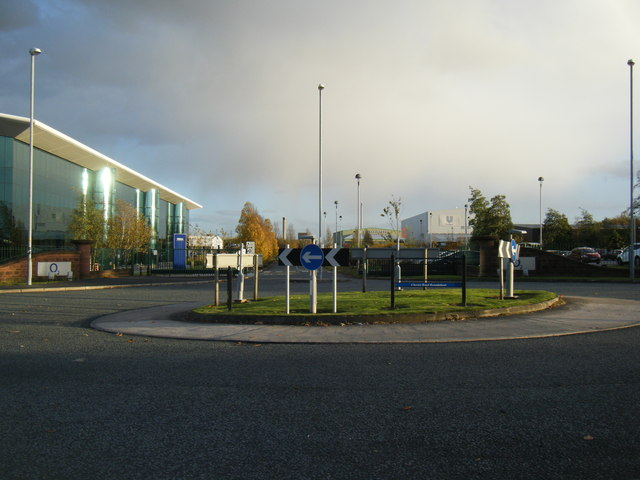
Abbots Park industrial estate

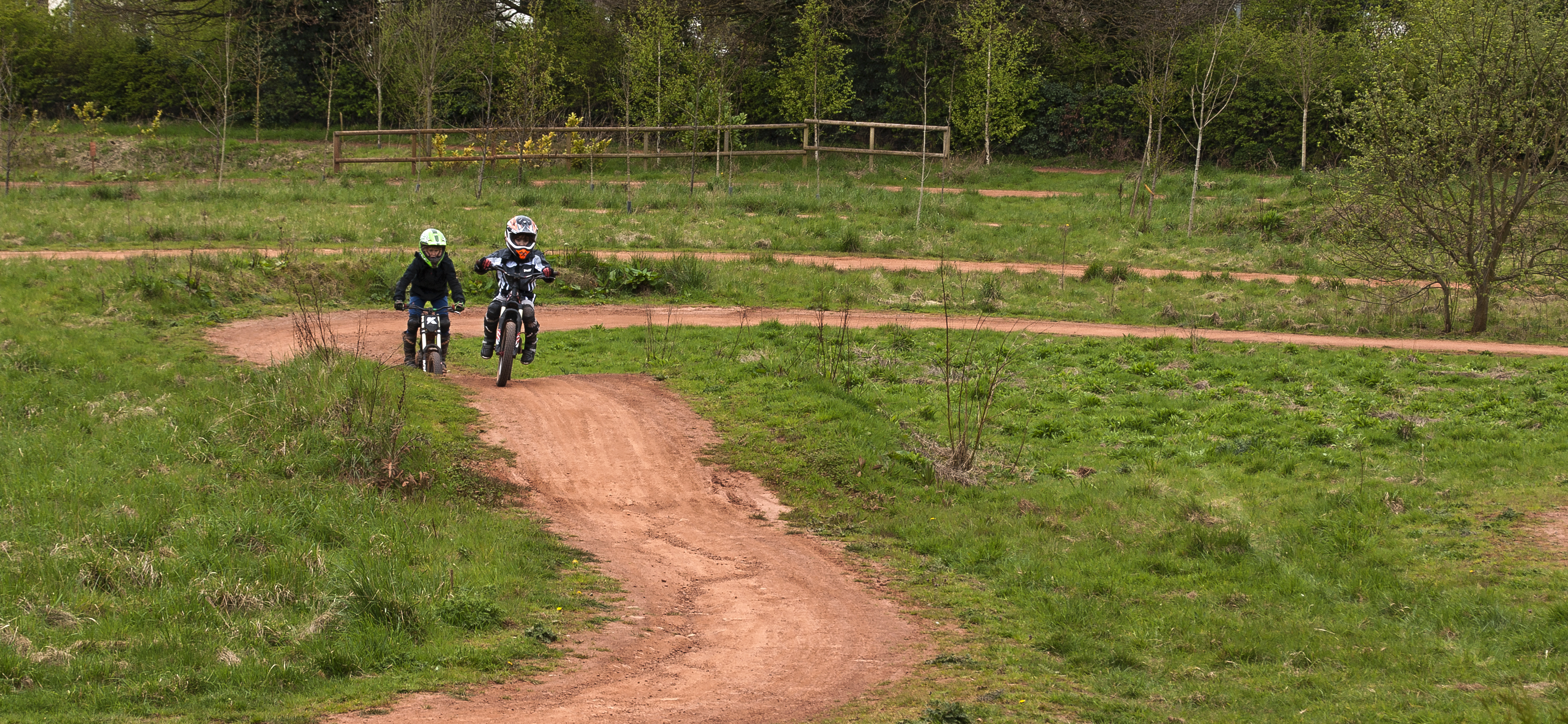
Children riding e-motorbikes at E-scape

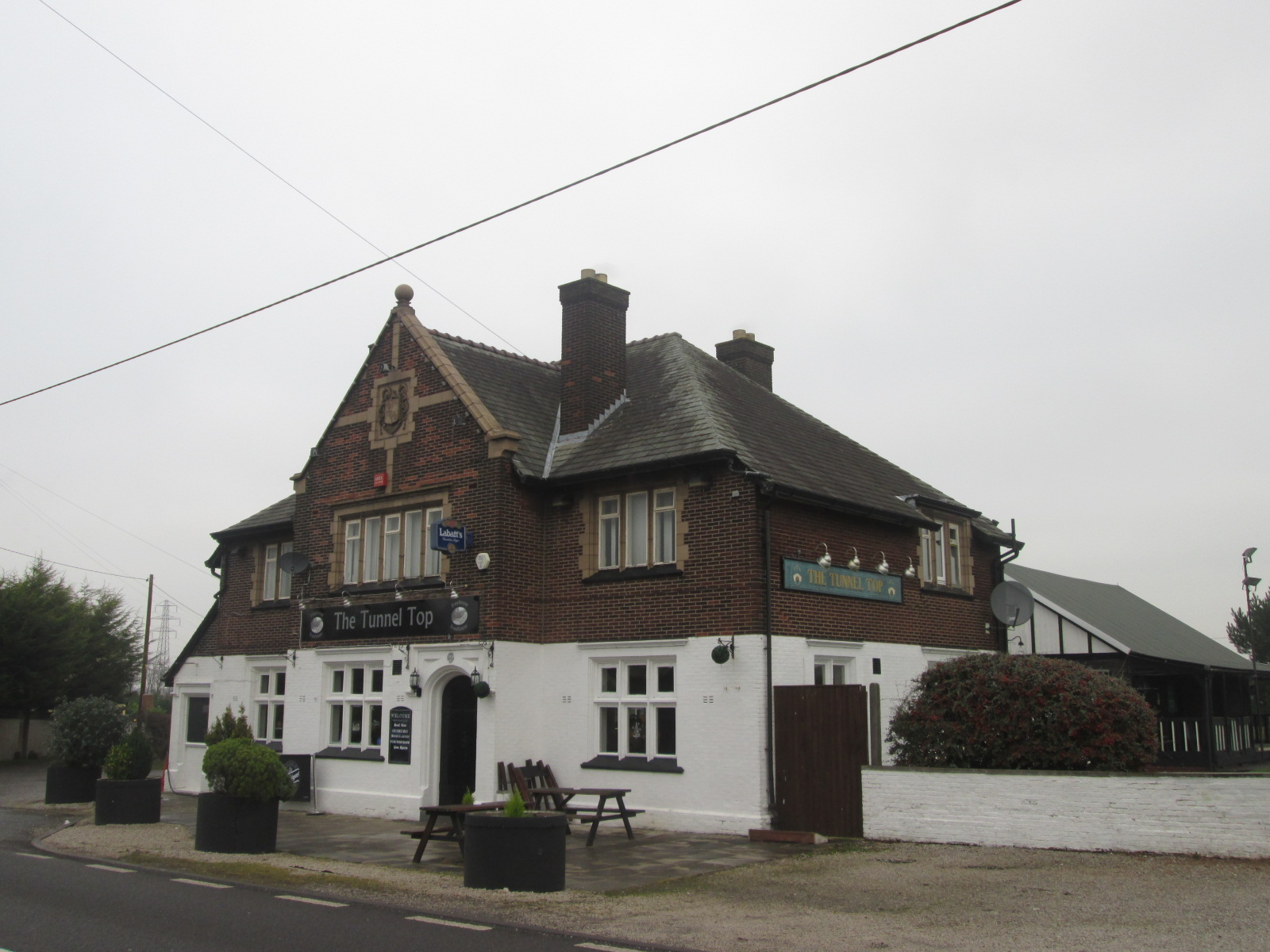
The Tunnel Top pub

== See also ==
- Listed buildings in Preston Brook
