= Preston on the Hill =

Village in Cheshire, England

Coordinates: 53.318313°N 2.630453°W

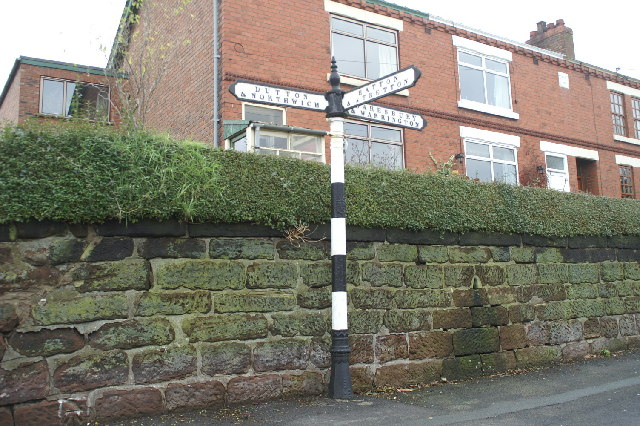
- Windmill Lane fingerpost

- Location within Cheshire
- OS grid reference: SJ5780
- Civil parish: Preston Brook
- Unitary authority: Halton
- Ceremonial county: Cheshire
- Region: North West
- Country: England
- Sovereign state: United Kingdom
- Post town: WARRINGTON
- Postcode district: WA4
- Dialling code: 01928
- Police: Cheshire
- Fire: Cheshire
- Ambulance: North West
- UK Parliament: Runcorn and Helsby

Preston on the Hill is a village and former civil parish, now in the parish of Preston Brook and the unitary authority area of Halton, in Cheshire, England. It is between the villages of Daresbury 1.5 miles (2.4 km) to the north and Dutton 1.1 miles (1.8 km) to the south. The village comprises the hamlets of Windmill Lane, Waterfront, Cotton's Bridge, Tunnel End North, Tunnel Top and Barker's Hollow as well as several farms including White House, Little Manor, New Manor, Windmill Farm and Humble Bee House.

== Etymology ==
The name Preston means "priest's house, farm or settlement" and is derived from the Old English prēost (a priest) and tūn (a farmstead or settlement). The meaning may refer to a priest from Norton Priory being housed on the edge of the priory estates.

== History ==
Despite its prominent position on a hilltop no evidence has been found in Preston-on-the-Hill of Neolithic, Bronze Age or Iron Age man having a settlement or even a fortification there. The Roman road from their settlement at Wilderspool near Warrington to the city of Chester (Deva Victrix) ran through the village, more or less along the lines of what is now the A56.

Preston is not mentioned directly in the Domesday Book of AD1086 but it was part of the lands held by William fitz Nigel, Baron of Halton who was one of the most powerful men in the country in Norman times. This part of the manor of Dutton was recorded as having just two farms in AD1086.

The first recorded reference to the name Preston is in the Chartulary of the Abbey of St. Werburgh, Chester between 1157 and 1194. During the reign of King John from 1167 – 1216 the township of Preston was purchased by Hugh Dutton of Dutton from Henry de Nuers and his wife Julien. The township rendered eight shillings yearly at the feast of St. Martin (11 November).

In the early 17th century the manor passed by marriage to the second Baron Gerard of Gerards Bromley. This family became Earls of Macclesfield. In 1705 Lord Gerard conveyed the manor to trustees to be sold for the payment of debts. The manor of Preston-on-the-Hill passed to the Fleetwood family by whom it was conveyed to the Grevilles who sold it to Thomas Brock of Chester and then he bequeathed it to Thomas Yates his nephew. He held the manor at the time that George Ormerod wrote his History of the County Palatine and City of Chester in 1817. He is named as the main landowner in the 1843 Tithe Apportionment. The manor then passed by marriage to Richard Barker. Later in the 19th century the manor was purchased by Gilbert Greenall, 1st Baron Daresbury of the Greenall's brewery family and added to the Walton estate.

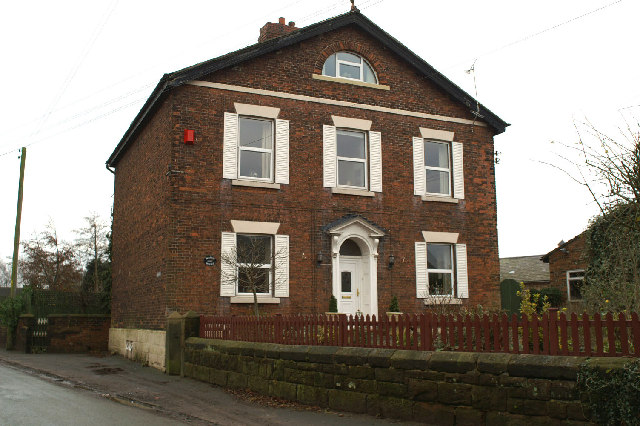
House at the junction of Hilltop Road and Windmill Lane

A number of old houses were renovated or demolished and re-built at the end of 19th century. In 1941 Lord Daresbury sold the estate mainly to his tenants.

Preston-on-the-Hill was formerly a township in the parish of Runcorn, in 1866 Preston on the Hill became a civil parish, on 1 April 1936 the parish was abolished to form Preston Brook.

At the time of the Hearth Tax in 1664 the population was 130, and it probably remained at about that level until the opening of the canal. By the time of the first headcount of population in 1801 the number was 333, rising to 594 in 1851 but dropping back to 454 in 1901 as the canal became less active. In 1931 the parish had a population of 355.

=== Religion ===
The village of Preston-on-the-Hill is in the ecclesiastical parish of All Saints Daresbury. The first reference to a religious house in the village is of a Meeting House for the Methodists in 1764. This was a house almost directly opposite the present chapel. This house was soon found to be too small and so a move was made across the road to a house on the site of the present chapel. It was at this house that John Wesley preached on two occasions, on 7 April 1781 and 12 May 1783. The first part of the 19th century saw a religious revival and the need for larger premises. In 1818 a Wesleyan Methodist chapel was built on Aston Lane in the neighbouring village of Preston Brook.

The Society of Primitive Methodists was formed in 1812, and supporters of this group stayed at the Meeting House in Preston-on-the-Hill. The present chapel was opened formally on 4 January 1883. It was considerably altered in 1975.

Perhaps the best known church in the area was the converted canal boat built in about 1840 by Lord Francis Egerton. For some years this boat went up and down the canal to be used by boatmen and their families. By 1860 it had been lifted out of the water and placed by the side of the Runcorn arm of the canal near its junction with the Bridgewater Canal. Charles Dodgson, the vicar of Daresbury and the father of Lewis Carroll, held services there for the boat people. It became known as the Watermen's Church. St. Faith's, a mission church from All Saints Daresbury was built in 1887, with funds from the Greenall family. It went out of use in the late 1990s and was subsequently sold for development into a house.

=== Education ===
Morris & Co.'s Directory of 1874 records a National School for children of both sexes in Preston-on the-Hill, supported by the Bridgewater Navigation Co. A Board School was built in 1877 for 30 children. In 1892 the average attendance was 27, with Miss Stormont as mistress. Board schools came into being following the Elementary Education Act 1870, and were able to raise funds from the local rates.

=== Bridgewater Canal ===
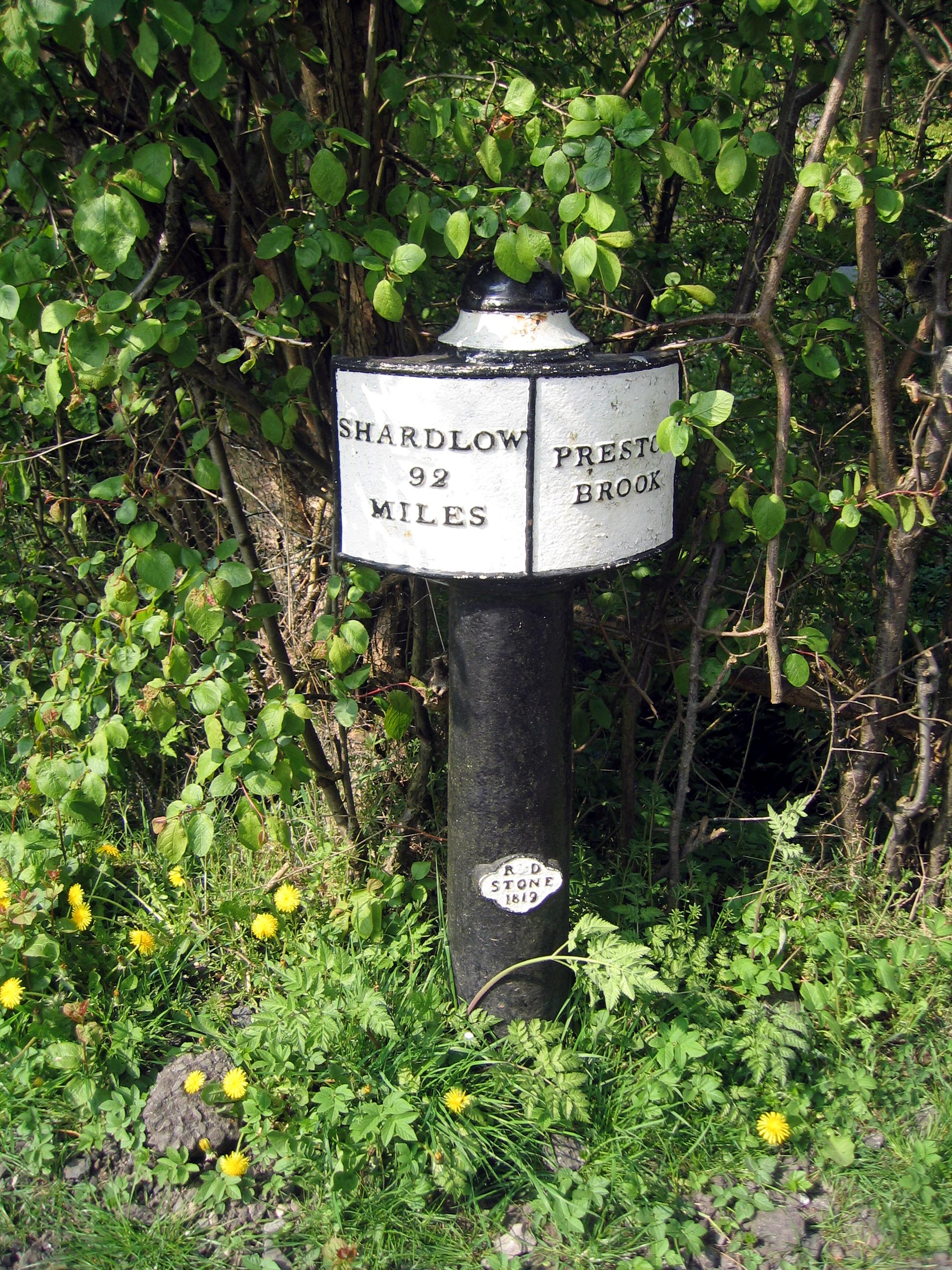
Mile post above Preston Brook Tunnel, found within the hamlet of Tunnel End North.

The single most influential thing to happen in the history of the villages of Preston on the Hill and neighbouring Preston Brook was the opening of the Bridgewater Canal in 1776. The canal was linked with the Trent & Mersey Canal in 1772 at a point just 11 yards inside the north end of the Preston Brook tunnel. This spot is marked today by a milepost on the path over the tunnel, which was used to walk the horses that pulled the boats the three-quarters of a mile to the other end near Dutton Locks. In January 1776 the final mile of the canal through the Norton Priory estate was cut and the canal opened for through traffic. Many trans-shipment warehouses were soon being built and the area really came into being as a very busy transport centre.

Few of these original buildings are left but examples still standing are the Stafford Warehouse on the main canal, which has now been converted into apartments, and Stitt's Warehouse on the Runcorn arm which is now a commercial building. The business activities in Preston Brook were encouraged by the opening in 1837 of the railway with a passenger station and a goods yard to allow materials to be transhipped to and from the canal. It was not until the third quarter of the 19th Century that canal traffic declined as the railway network spread throughout the country. The passenger station was closed on 1 March 1948, and the Goods Depot on 1st. September 1958.

For almost one hundred years all boats were horse drawn and were "legged" through the tunnel, however in 1865 steam tugs were introduced, but the tunnel had no air vents, resulting in a number of boatmen being overcome by fumes and dying. Very soon ventilation shafts were sunk. A section of the Preston Brook tunnel collapsed much more recently in November 1981, and the tunnel was closed for repair until April 1984.

=== Developments ===
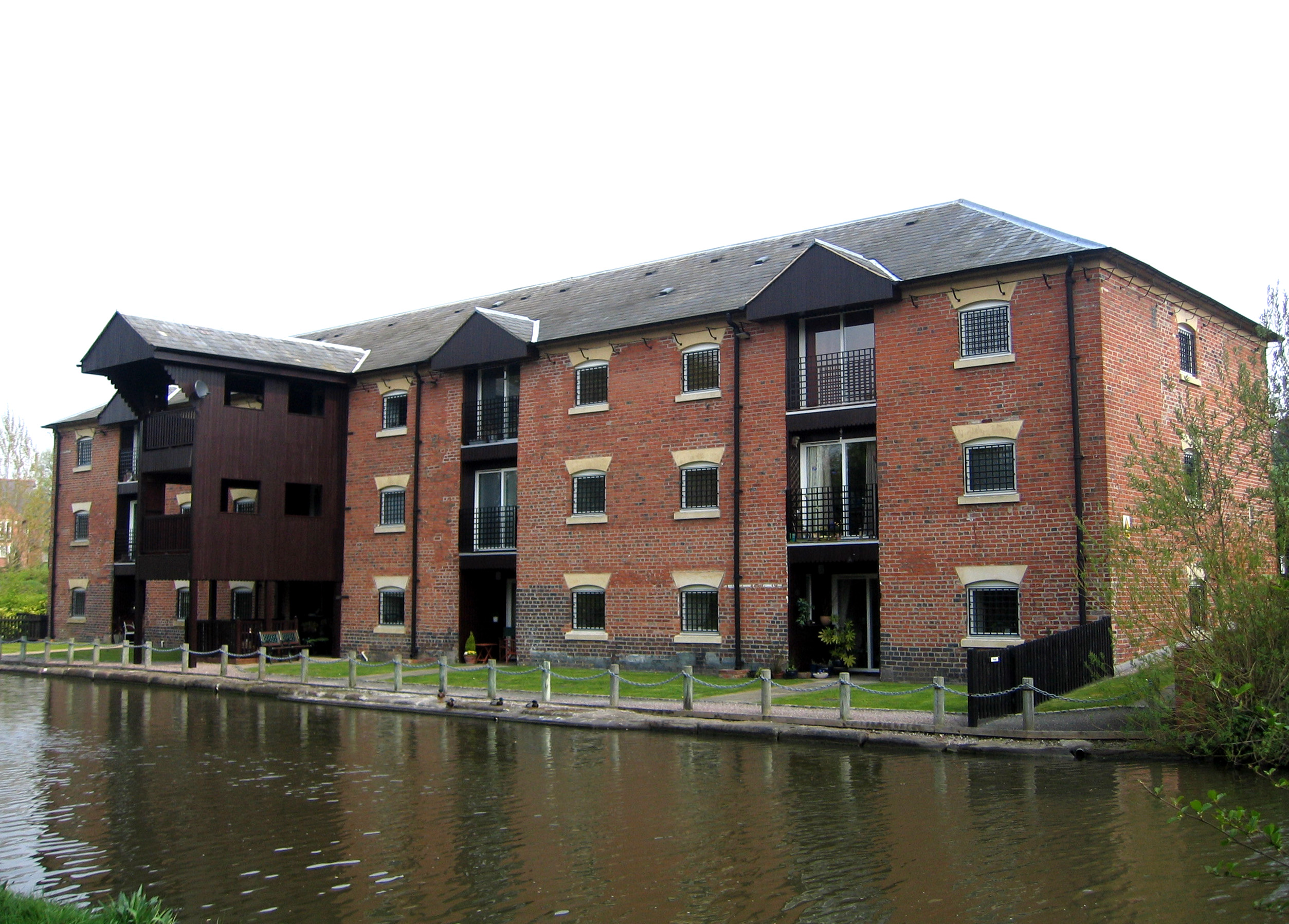
Converted warehouse apartments originally New Stafford Warehouse.

The M56 motorway was officially opened on 23 September 1971. Its building had resulted in the compulsory purchase of a significant quantity of farmland.

Of the residential developments in the village, the Waterfront houses were completed at the end of 1999, having been built on the site of the house of the manager of the warehouse known as The New Stafford Warehouse. The building became a restaurant under the name Neptunes Landing and then a nightclub called The Old No.1. It was converted into apartments as part of the Waterfront development. The Granary apartments at the corner of Hilltop Road is a new building, but the site has been the home of a milk distribution depot and for its last few years a scaffolding yard. The apartments were completed in 2002.

The Runcorn Poor Law Workhouse once stood on a site at the corner of Barkers Hollow Road and Northwich Road (A533) now occupied by three bungalows. The original workhouse was built between 1855 and 1857 for 280 inmates. The workhouse infirmary was enlarged in 1881–82, with further extensions in 1895 and a nurses' home in 1906.

Sumner's Farm and its outbuildings on Windmill Lane were converted to residential in 2005.

Windmill Cottage and farm was significantly redeveloped in 2020 with two barn conversions, extension and refurbishment of windmill cottage farm and two new five bedroom dwellings currently on sale for £950,000.

== Governance ==
Preston on the Hill is administered as part of the civil parish of Preston Brook within the unitary authority of Halton.

The village is within the parliamentary constituency of Runcorn and Helsby.

== Transport ==
=== Main Roads ===
A short section of the A56 Chester Road runs through the northwest of the village from the M56 Junction 11 Daresbury roundabout to the Preston Brook canal and railway bridges. This section is approximately equidistant between the small market town of Frodsham and the main population centre of Warrington providing the village with good access to both. The junction with the M56 provides the village with easy access to North Wales, the M6 Lymm Interchange, Manchester Airport and City Centre.

A short section of the A533 Northwich Road runs through southwest the village at Tunnel Top. This road provides the village with easy access to the centres of the small towns of Northwich to the southeast and Runcorn and Widnes to the northwest. The village again lying at a point approximately equidistant.

=== Minor Roads ===
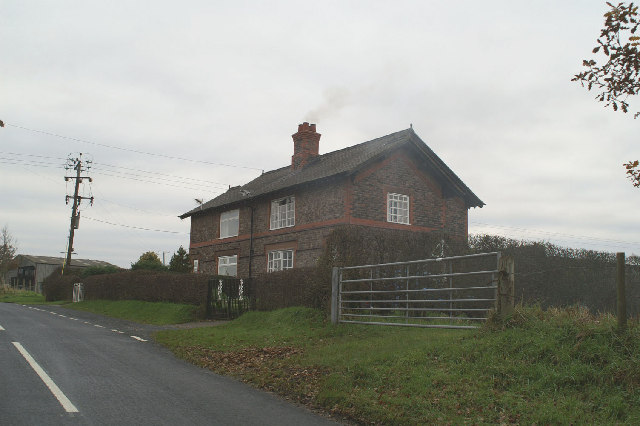
Ivy Mount Cottages, Barker's Hollow Road

The main village infrastructure comprises a small number of minor roads. The main artery through the village is Windmill Lane joining with Barker's Hollow Road, which runs north to south connecting the A56 and the A533. Hilltop Road forms a junction with Windmill Lane and Barker's Hollow Road and runs west downhill to another junction with the A56 at St.Faith's Mission. It provides access to the no through road along Waterfront leading to Cotton's Bridge. Cotton's Bridge canal bridge was demolished circa 1890.

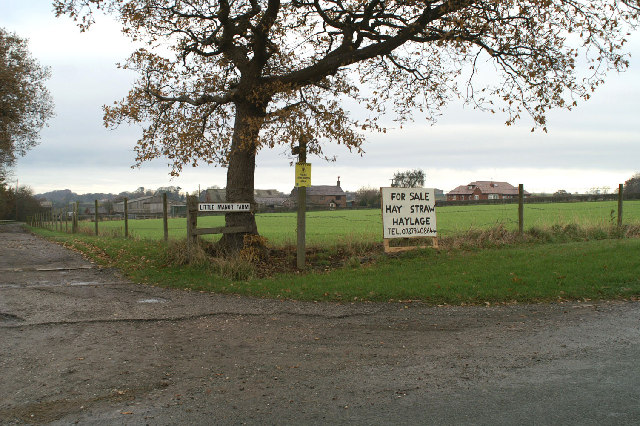
Little Manor Farm entrance from Summer Lane.

Summer Lane provides access from Windmill Lane to the neighbouring villages of Daresbury and Hatton. Higher Lane to the south of the village forms an approximate boundary with Dutton and joins with Daresbury and the A533.

=== Rail ===
The Warrington to Crewe section of the West Coast Main Line runs along the western edge of the village and can be embarked easily from Warrington Bank Quay station.

The Chester to Manchester Piccadilly line can also be accessed easily at Frodsham and provides access to the North Wales Coast Line via Chester.

The West Midlands Trains service from Liverpool Lime Street to Birmingham New Street can be accessed easily at Runcorn or Hartford.
