= Canby Mountain =

Mountain in the American state of Colorado

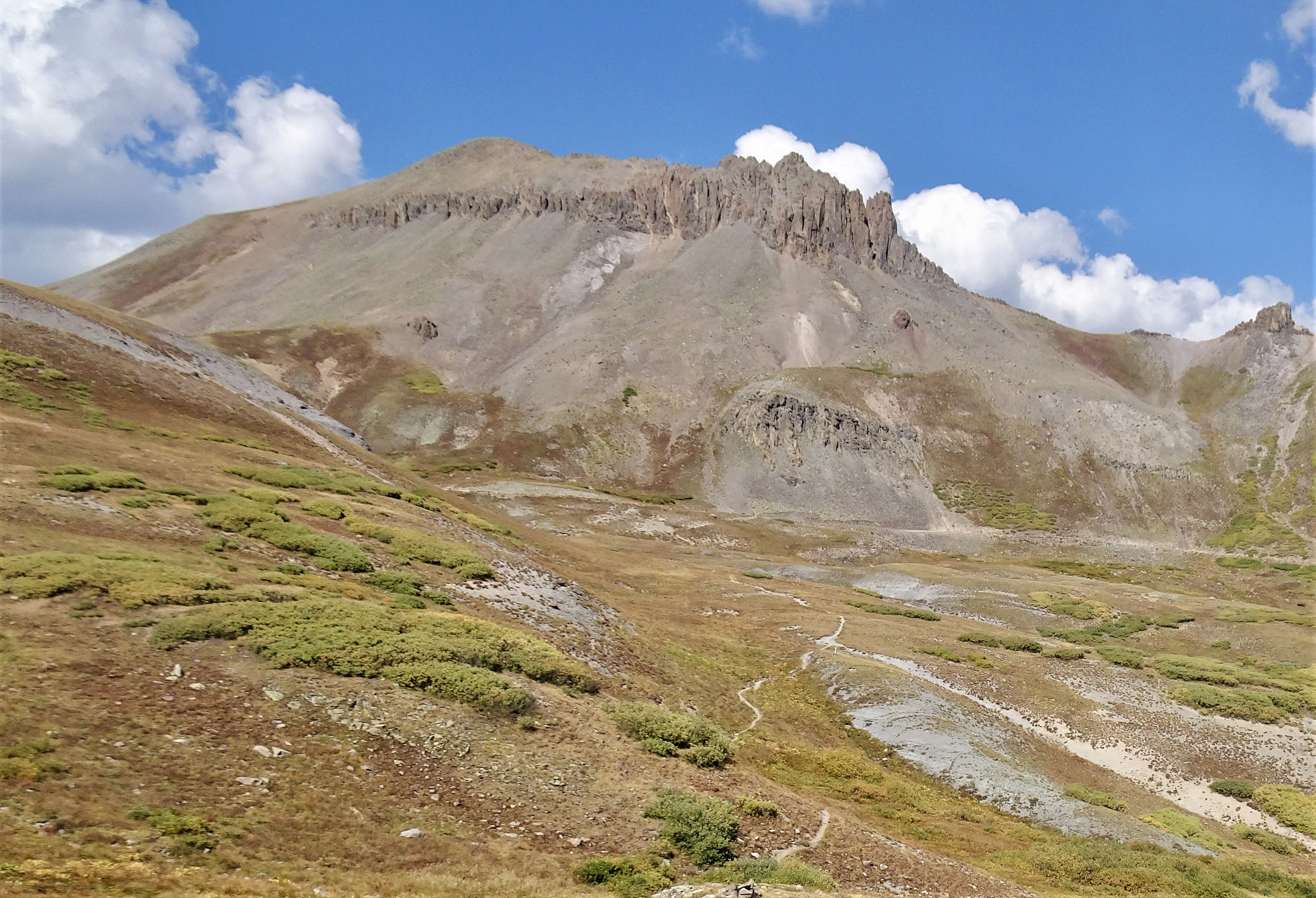
- South aspect

Highest point
- Elevation: 13,478 ft (4,108 m)
- Prominence: 947 ft (289 m)
- Parent peak: Niagara Peak (13,812 ft)
- Isolation: 5.52 mi (8.88 km)
- Coordinates: 37°47′59″N 107°32′46″W

Geography
- Location within Colorado Location within the United States
- Country: United States
- State: Colorado
- County: San Juan County
- Parent range: Rocky Mountains; San Juan Mountains
- Topo map: USGS Howardsville

Climbing
- Easiest route: class 2 hiking

Canby Mountain is a 13,478-foot-elevation (4,108-meter) mountain summit in San Juan County, Colorado, United States.

== Description ==
Canby Mountain is located six miles (9.7 km) east of the community of Silverton, on land managed by Rio Grande National Forest. Canby Mountain is situated on the Continental Divide in the San Juan Mountains which are a subrange of the Rocky Mountains. Headwaters of the Rio Grande form at the eastern base of the mountain, whereas precipitation runoff from the mountain's west slope drains into tributaries of the Animas River. Topographic relief is modest as the summit rises 1,300 feet (400 meters) in one-half mile (0.8 km). Neighbors include Sheep Mountain, 1.87 miles (3.01 km) to the southeast and Greenhalgh Mountain, 2.49 miles (4.01 km) to the east-southeast. The Continental Divide Trail and Colorado Trail traverse the peak's slopes and an ascent of the summit from historic Stony Pass covers one-half mile of off-trail hiking with 890-feet of elevation gain. The mountain's toponym has been officially adopted by the United States Board on Geographic Names, and was recorded in publications as "Mount Canby" as early as 1877.

== Climate ==
According to the Köppen climate classification system, Canby Mountain is located in an alpine subarctic climate zone with cold, snowy winters, and cool to warm summers. Due to its altitude, it receives precipitation all year, as snow in winter and as thunderstorms in summer, with a dry period in late spring.

== Gallery ==
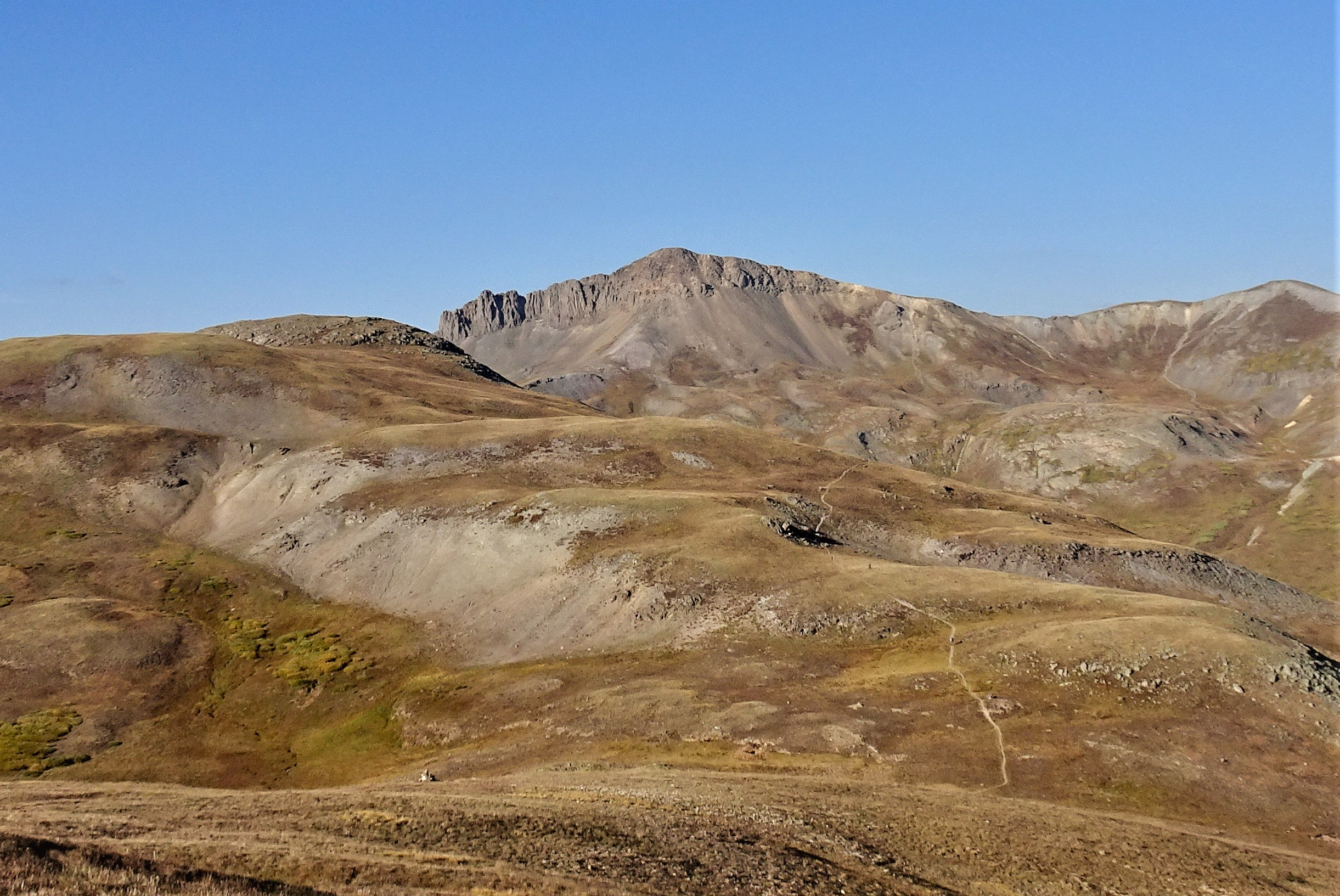
East aspect

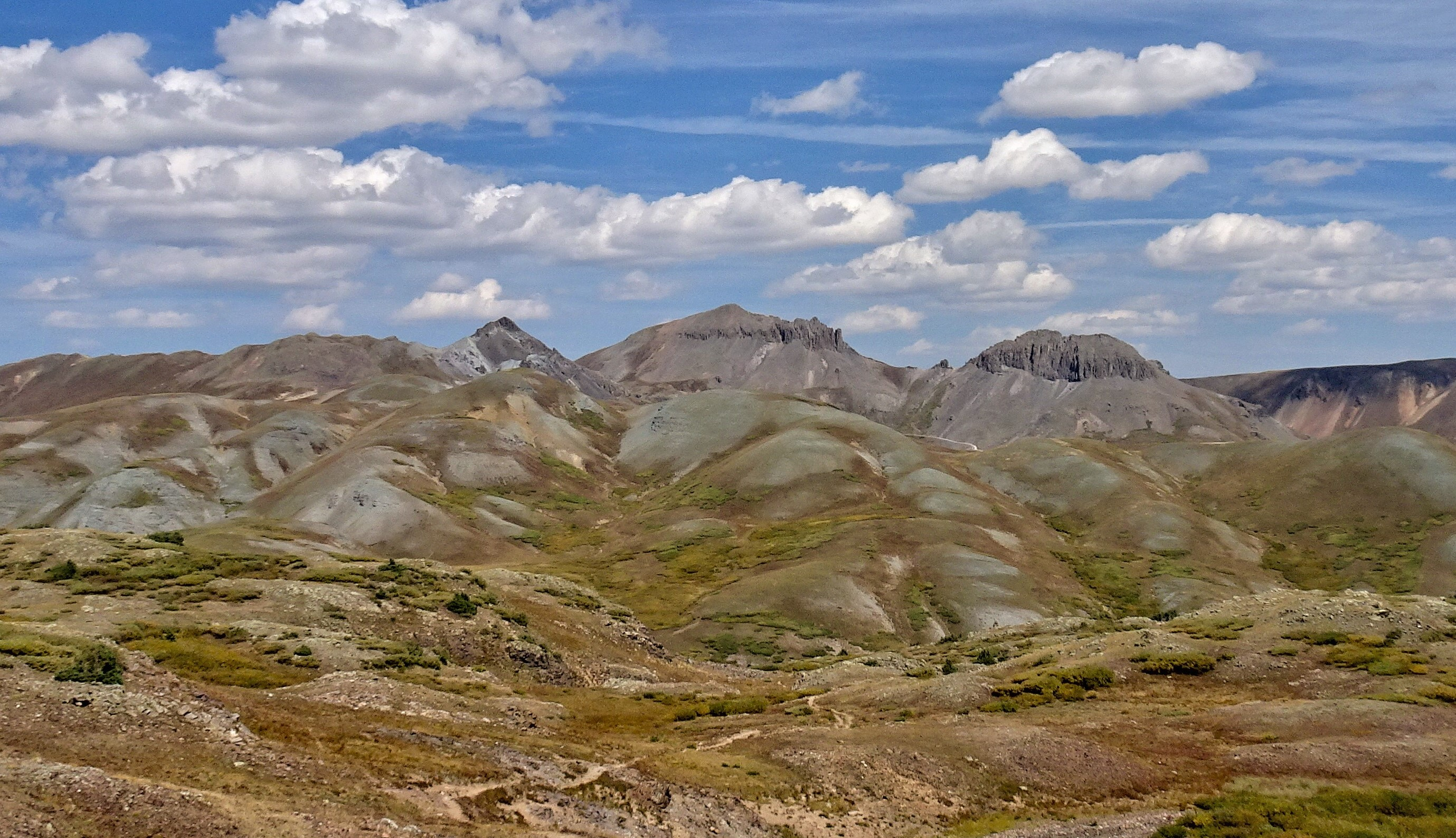
South aspect of Canby Mountain viewed from Colorado Trail

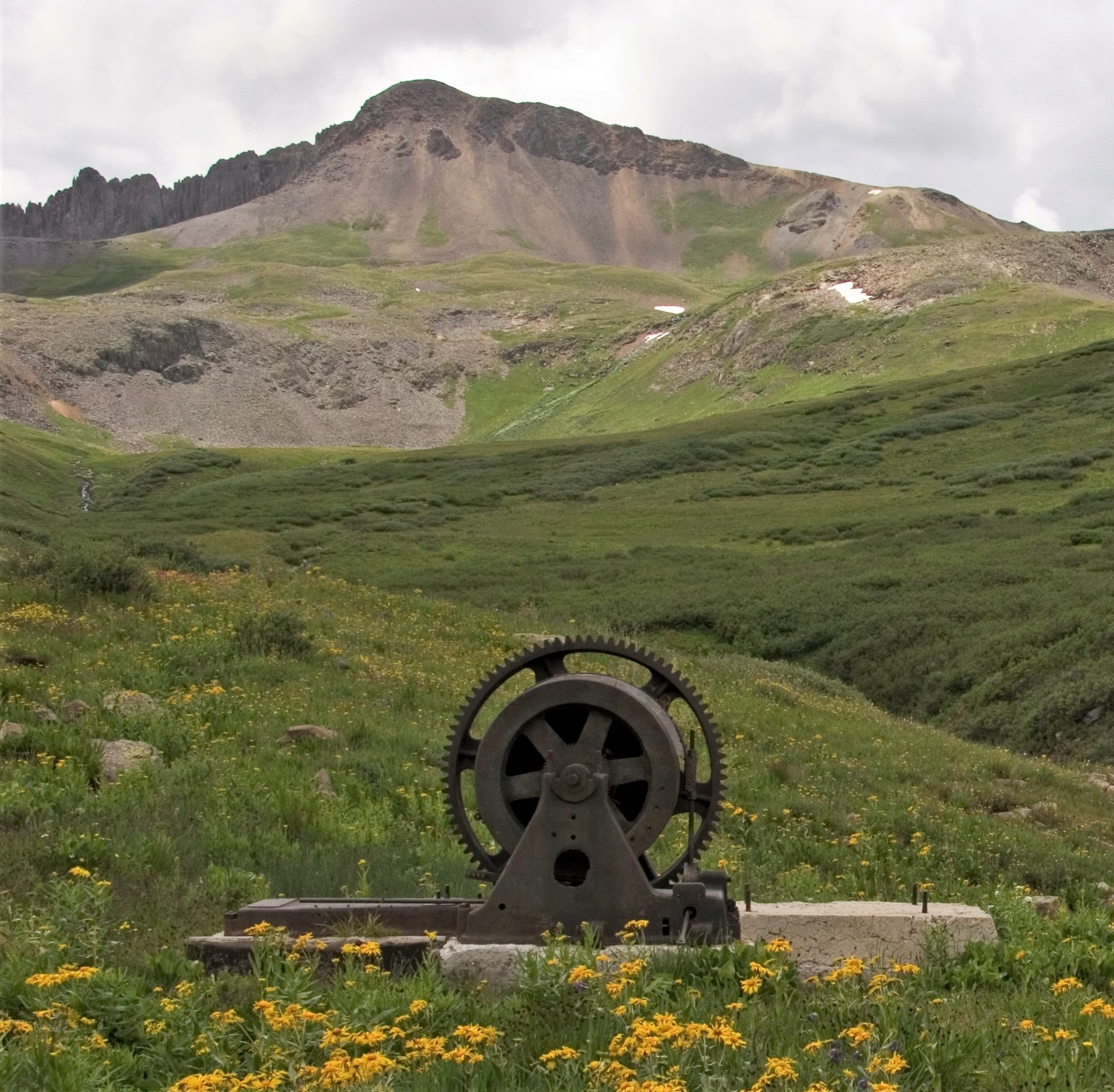
North aspect viewed from Maggie Gulch

== See also ==
- Thirteener
- Mountains of San Juan County, Colorado
- Edward Canby
