= Sheep Mountain (San Juan County, Colorado) =

Mountain in the American state of Colorado

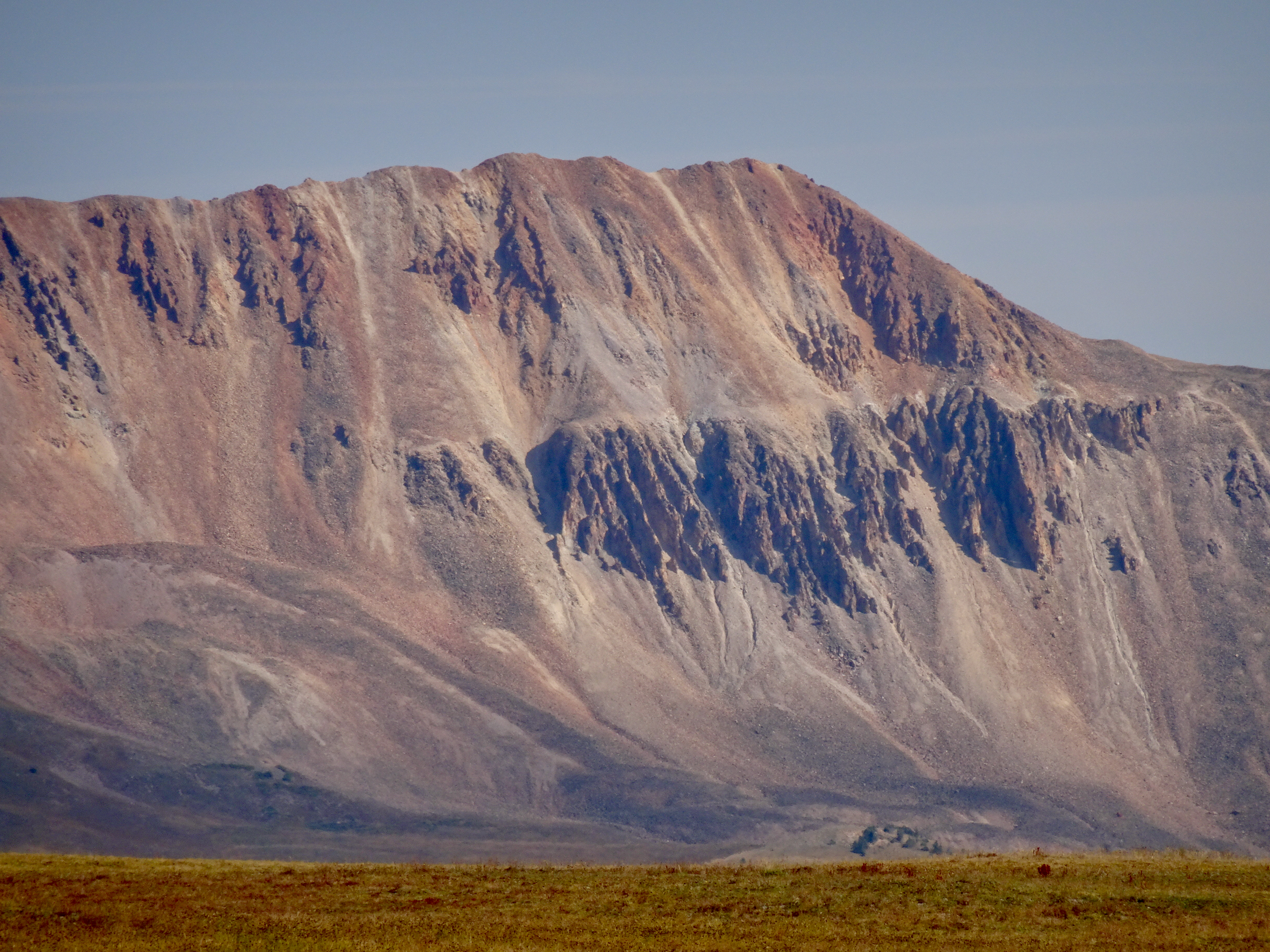
- South aspect

Highest point
- Elevation: 13,292 ft (4,051 m)
- Prominence: 662 ft (202 m)
- Parent peak: Canby Mountain (13,478 ft)
- Isolation: 1.91 mi (3.07 km)
- Coordinates: 37°47′00″N 107°31′04″W

Geography
- Location within Colorado Location within the United States
- Country: United States
- State: Colorado
- County: San Juan County
- Parent range: Rocky Mountains; San Juan Mountains
- Topo map: USGS Howardsville

Climbing
- Easiest route: class 2 hiking

Sheep Mountain is a 13,292-foot-elevation (4,051-meter) mountain summit in San Juan County, Colorado, United States.

== Description ==
Sheep Mountain is located eight miles (13 km) east-southeast of the community of Silverton, on land managed by Rio Grande National Forest. It is situated two miles (3.2 km) east of the Continental Divide in the San Juan Mountains which are a subrange of the Rocky Mountains. Precipitation runoff from the mountain's slopes drains into tributaries of the Rio Grande and topographic relief is modest as the summit rises nearly 2,400 feet (730 meters) above the river in 1.25 mile (2 km). Neighbors include Greenhalgh Mountain, 0.79 miles (1.27 km) to the east and Canby Mountain, 1.87 miles (3.01 km) to the northwest. The mountain's toponym has been officially adopted by the United States Board on Geographic Names, and has been recorded in publications as early as 1906. There are 19 landforms named "Sheep Mountain" in Colorado and this one is the highest.

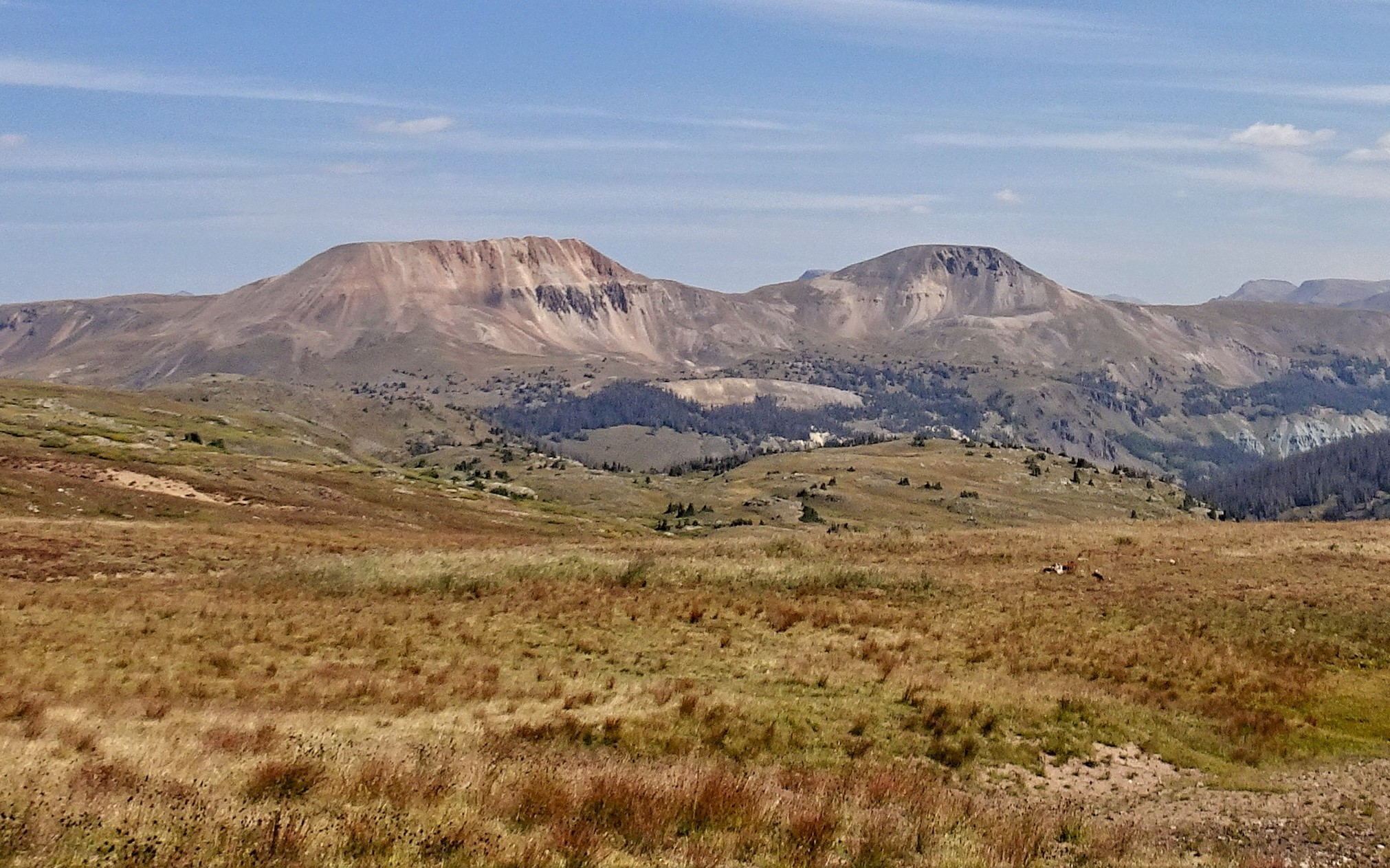
Sheep Mountain (left) and Greenhalgh Mountain

== Climate ==
According to the Köppen climate classification system, Sheep Mountain is located in an alpine subarctic climate zone with cold, snowy winters, and cool to warm summers. Due to its altitude, it receives precipitation all year, as snow in winter and as thunderstorms in summer, with a dry period in late spring.

== See also ==
- Thirteener
- Mountains of San Juan County, Colorado
