= Stony Pass =

Mountain pass in Colorado, USA

- Location within Colorado
- Elevation: 12,592 feet (3,838 m)
- Traversed by: unimproved road, Colorado Trail

Third Approach
- Location: San Juan County, Colorado, U.S.
- Range: San Juan Mountains
- Coordinates: 37°47′43″N 107°32′58″W
- Topo map: USGS Howardsville

Stony Pass, elevation 12,592 ft (3,838 m), is a mountain pass in the San Juan Mountains of southwest Colorado. It is one-half mile southwest of Canby Mountain. It is near the headwaters of the Rio Grande.

== See also ==
- Colorado mountain passes
