= John Greenhalgh (footballer) =

English footballer

Personal information
- Full name: John Stanley Greenhalgh
- Date of birth: 16 July 1898
- Place of birth: Bolton, Lancashire, England
- Date of death: July 1987 (aged 88–89)
- Height: 5 ft 7 1/2 in (1.71 m)
- Position: Inside forward

Senior career*
Years	Team	Apps	(Gls)
1922–1925	Burnley	7	(0)
1925	Barrow	0	(0)
1925–1926	Accrington Stanley	13	(3)
- * Club domestic league appearances and goals

John Stanley Greenhalgh (16 July 1898 – July 1987) was an English footballer who played as an inside forward in The Football League with Burnley and Accrington Stanley in the 1920s.
