= Greenhalgh Mountain =

Mountain in Colorado, United States

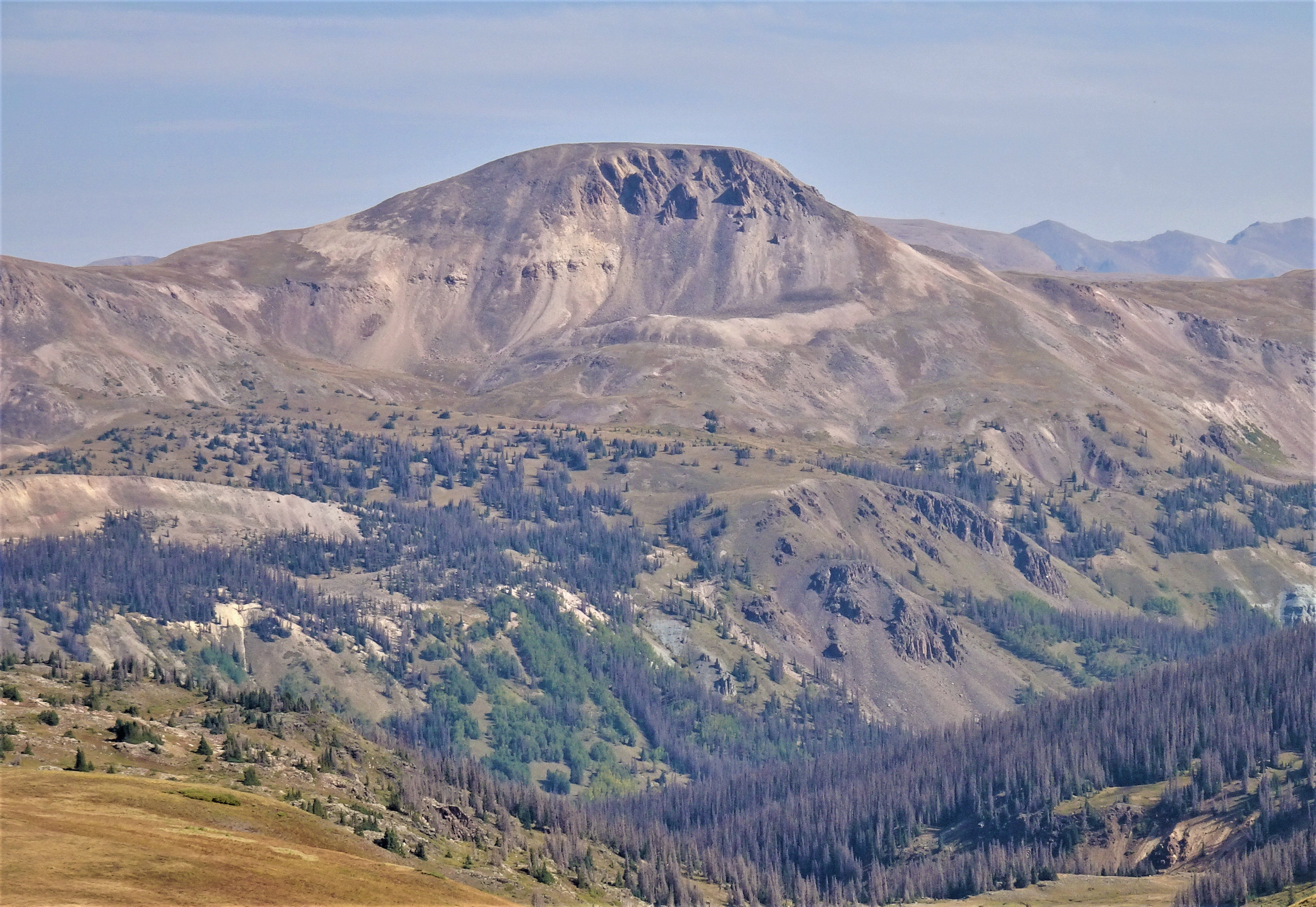
- South-southwest aspect

Highest point
- Elevation: 13,220 ft (4,029 m)
- Prominence: 420 ft (128 m)
- Parent peak: Sheep Mountain (13,304 ft)
- Isolation: 0.74 mi (1.19 km)
- Coordinates: 37°47′06″N 107°30′15″W

Geography
- Location within Colorado Location within the United States
- Country: United States
- State: Colorado
- County: San Juan County
- Parent range: Rocky Mountains; San Juan Mountains
- Topo map: USGS Howardsville

Climbing
- Easiest route: class 2 hiking

Greenhalgh Mountain is a 13,220-foot-elevation (4,030-meter) mountain summit in San Juan County, Colorado, United States.

== Description ==
Greenhalgh Mountain is located nine miles (14 km) east-southeast of the community of Silverton, on land managed by Rio Grande National Forest. It is situated less than three miles (4.8 km) east of the Continental Divide in the San Juan Mountains which are a subrange of the Rocky Mountains. Precipitation runoff from the mountain's slopes drains into tributaries of the Rio Grande and topographic relief is modest as the summit rises 2,400 feet (730 meters) above the river in 1.25 mile (2 km). Neighbors include Sheep Mountain, 0.79 miles (1.27 km) to the west and Canby Mountain, 2.49 miles (4.01 km) to the northwest. The mountain's toponym has been officially adopted by the United States Board on Geographic Names, and was recorded in publications as early as 1906.

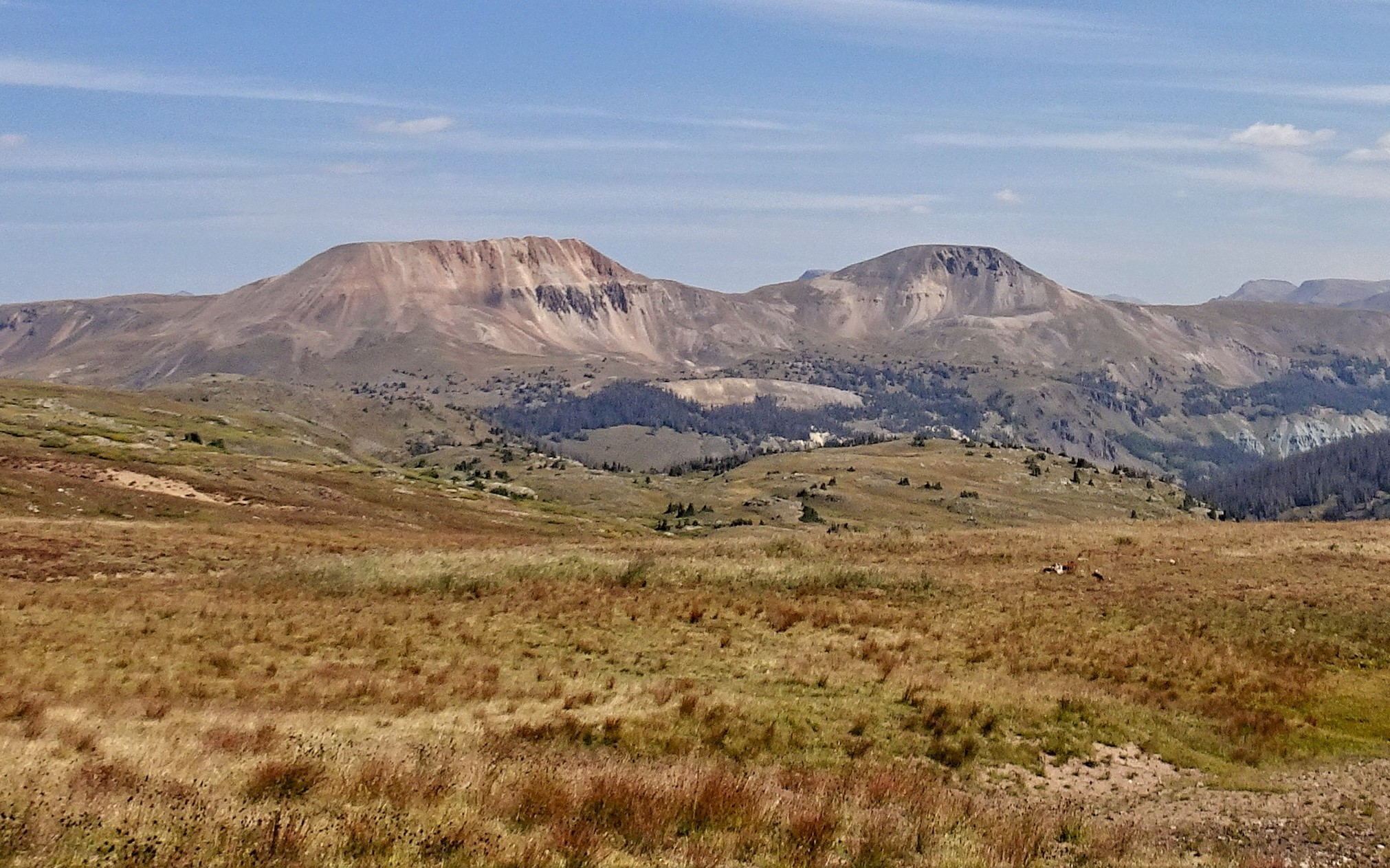
Sheep Mountain and Greenhalgh Mountain (right)

== Climate ==
According to the Köppen climate classification system, Greenhalgh Mountain is located in an alpine subarctic climate zone with cold, snowy winters, and cool to warm summers. Due to its altitude, it receives precipitation all year, as snow in winter and as thunderstorms in summer, with a dry period in late spring.

== See also ==
- Thirteener
- Mountains of San Juan County, Colorado
