= Nick Greenhalgh =

English rugby union player (born 1989)

- Born: Nick Greenhalgh; 8 November 1989 (age 37) Northampton, England
- Height: 5 ft 10 in (1.78 m)
- Weight: 13 st 0 lb (- kg)
- School: Uppingham School, Rutland

Rugby union career
- Position: Outside Centre
- Current team: Northampton Saints
Amateur team(s)
Years	Team	Apps	(Points)
- Towcester RFC
Senior career
Years	Team	Apps	(Points)
2008–	Northampton Saints	1	(0)
- Correct as of 27 May 2009

Nick Greenhalgh (born 8 November 1989) is a former professional Rugby player, he last played for Northampton Saints in the Guinness Premiership. His preferred position is outside centre.

His first game was against Bristol Rugby in the EDF Energy Trophy when he came on as substitute for the final 2 minutes.
