= Niagara Peak =

Mountain in Colorado, United States

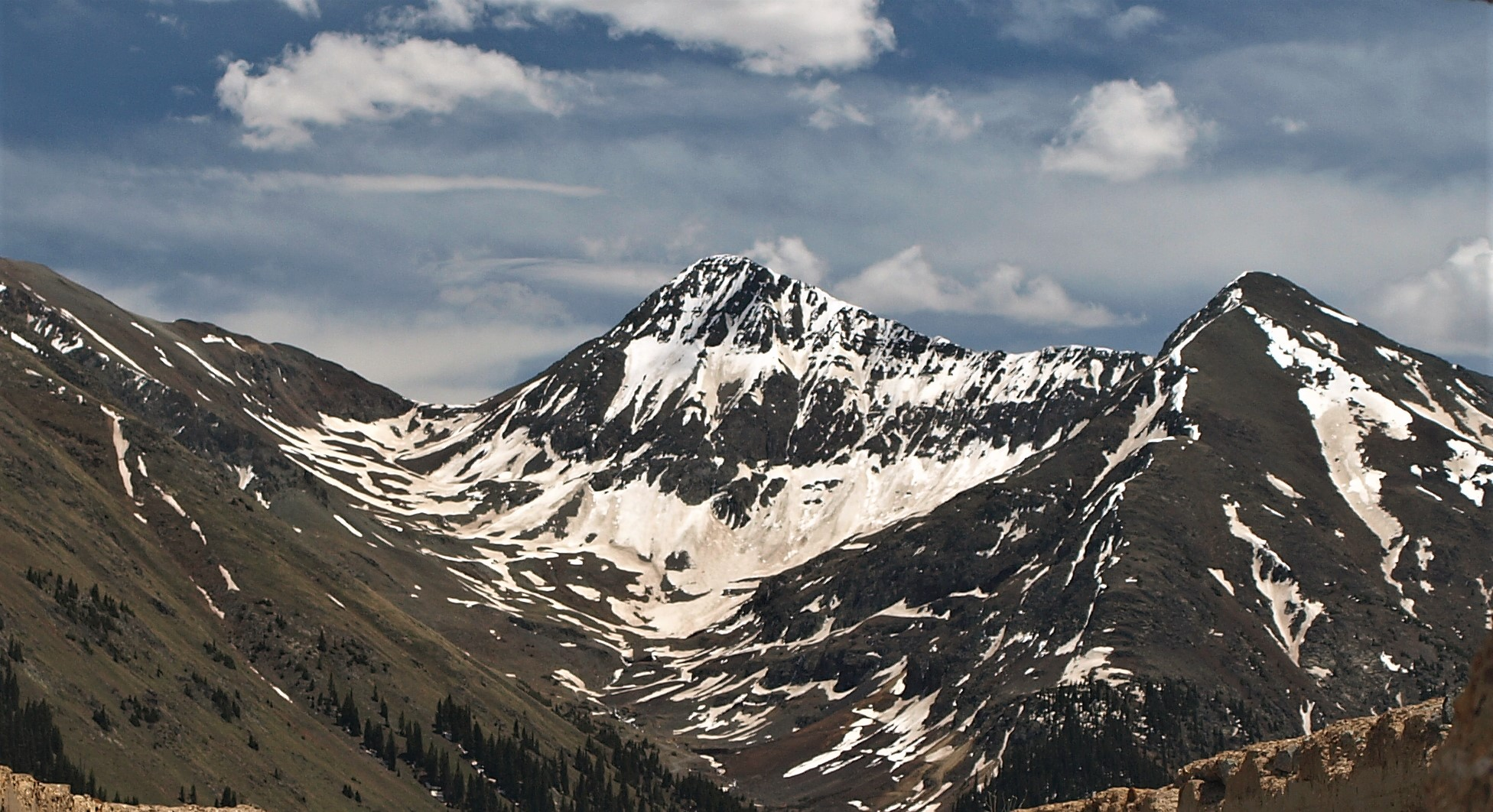
- North face

Highest point
- Elevation: 13,812 ft (4,210 m)
- Prominence: 567 ft (173 m)
- Isolation: 0.63 mi (1.01 km)
- Coordinates: 37°53′21″N 107°32′01″W

Geography
- Location within Colorado
- Location: Hinsdale and San Juan counties, Colorado, U.S.
- Parent range: San Juan Mountains
- Topo map(s): USGS 7.5' topographic map Handies Peak, Colorado

Niagara Peak is a high mountain summit in the San Juan Mountains range of the Rocky Mountains System, in southwestern Colorado.

The 13,812-foot (4,210 m) thirteener is located 8.9 miles (14.4 km) northeast by east (bearing 53°) of the Town of Silverton, on the Continental Divide between Hinsdale and San Juan counties.

== Climate ==
According to the Köppen climate classification system, Niagara Peak has an alpine climate with cold, snowy winters, and cool to warm summers. Due to its altitude, it receives precipitation all year, as snow in winter and as thunderstorms in summer, with a dry period in late spring.

== See also ==
- List of Colorado mountain summits
- List of the most prominent summits of Colorado
- List of Colorado county high points

== Gallery ==
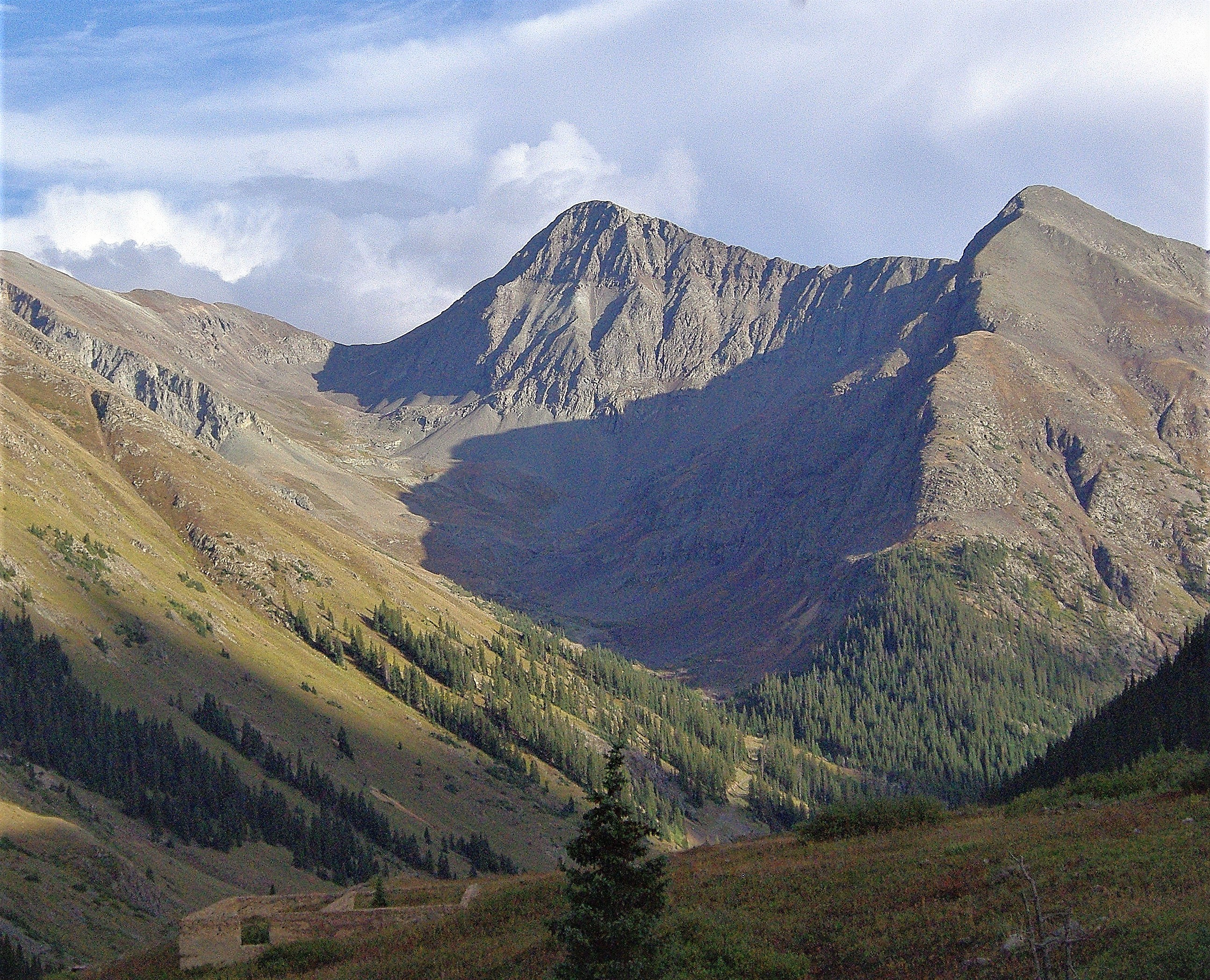
North aspect

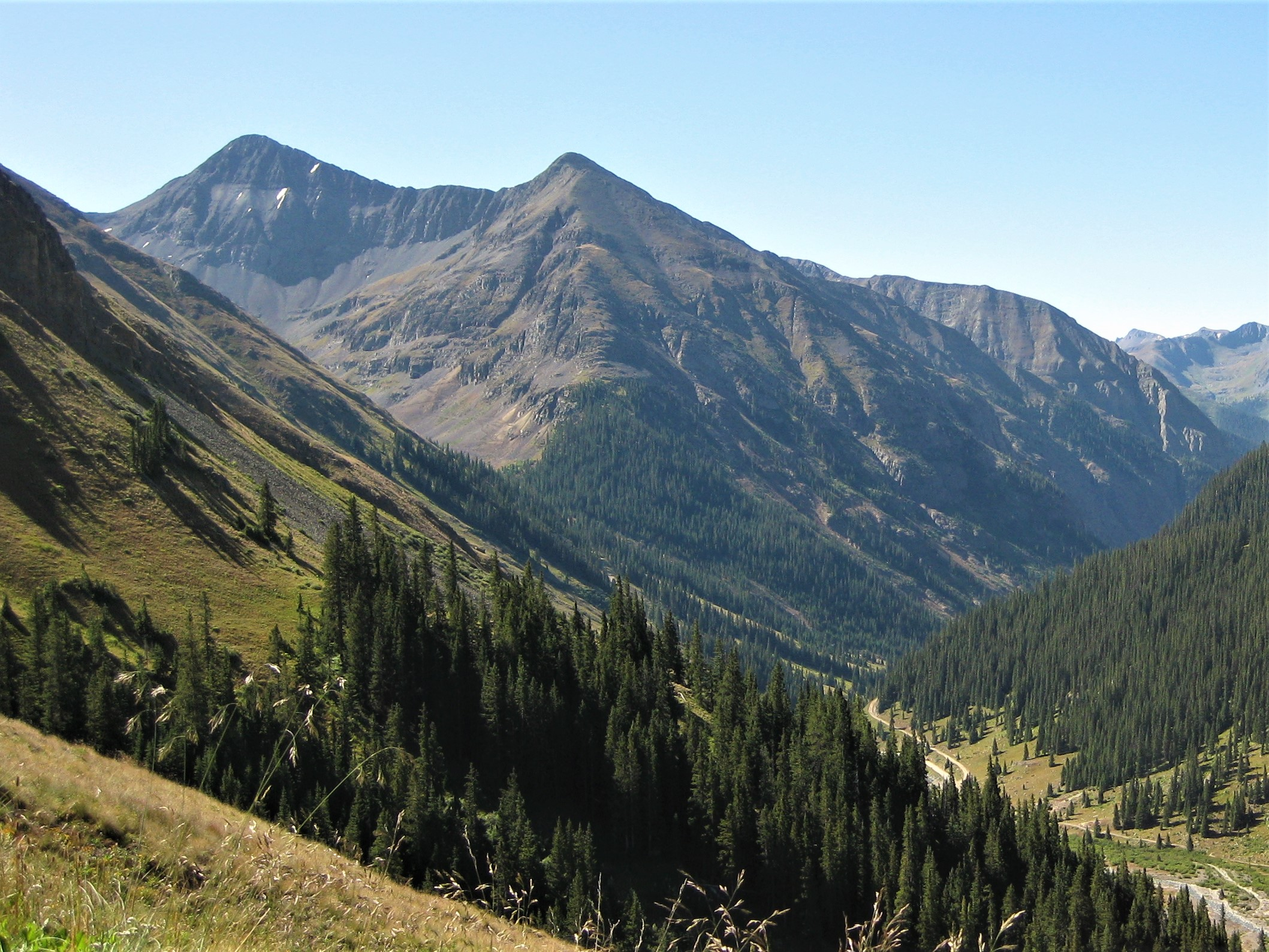
North face, upper left corner

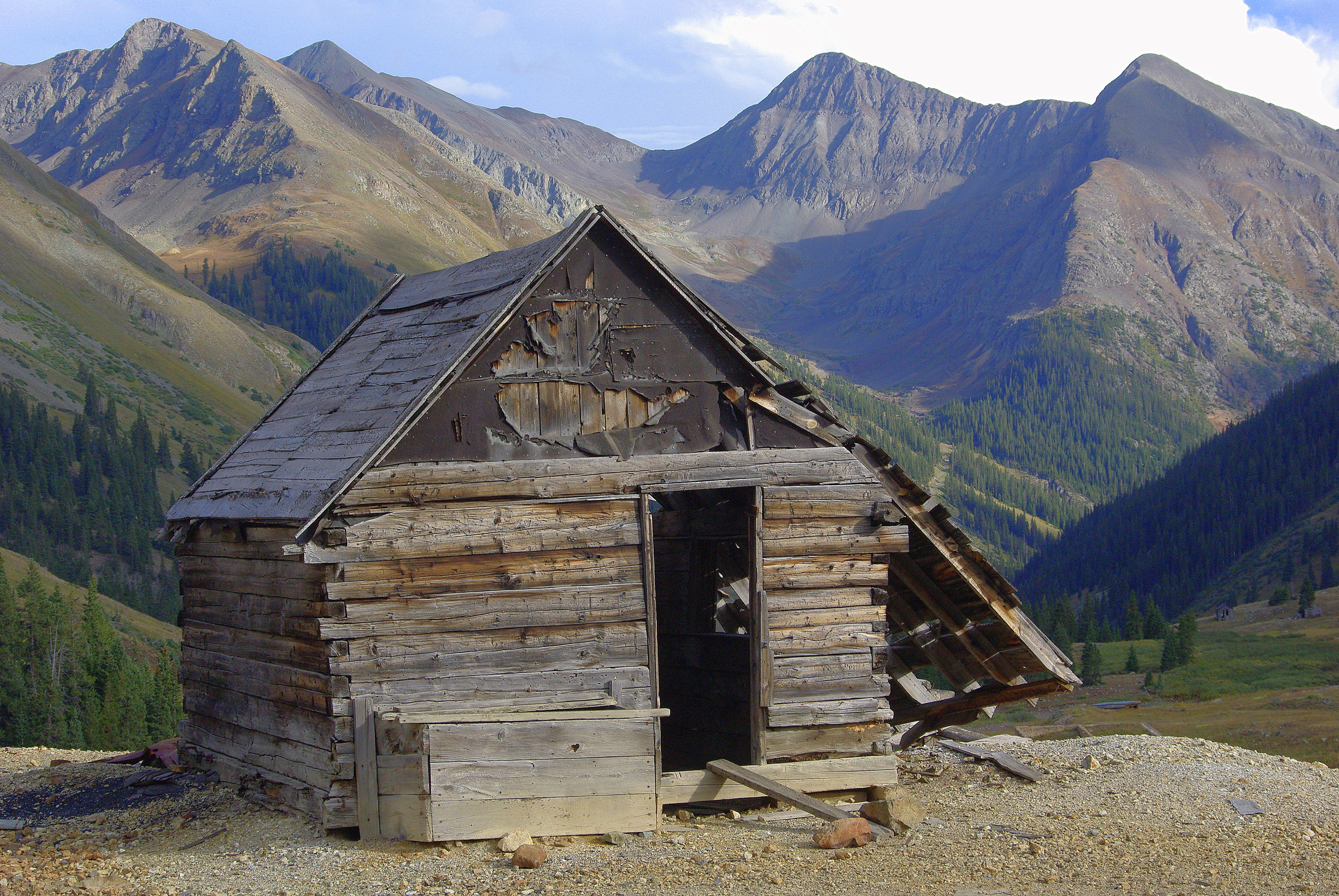
Niagara Peak to right of center.
