= Greenall =

Greenall is a British locational or topographical surname which has been abbreviated from Green Hollow/Hole, Green Hill or Green Halgh. Notable people with the surname include:

- Colin Greenall (born 1963), English footballer
- Doug Greenall, English rugby league footballer and coach
- Sir Gilbert Greenall, 1st Baronet (1806–1894), English businessman and politician
- Gilbert Greenall, 1st Baron Daresbury (1867–1938), English businessman
- Margaret Greenall, English businesswoman
- Simon Greenall, British actor
- Fin Greenall, English singer-songwriter, producer and DJ

== See also ==
- Greenall's, formerly a brewery in England
- Greenhalgh (disambiguation)
- Greenhill (disambiguation)
