= Rotex Global =

Rotex Global, LLC
- Industry: Screeners and Separators
- Founded: 1837
- Founder: Isaac Straub
- Headquarters: Cincinnati, Ohio, Cincinnati, Ohio, U.S.
- Area served: Worldwide
- Website: rotex.com

ROTEX Global, LLC was founded in 1844 and is the oldest capital manufacturer in the Cincinnati community. Dealing with the advancement of screening equipment and technology for the processing industries, Rotex manufactures screening equipment, feeders, conveyors, and automated analyzers that serve a global market. Rotex serves chemical, food, and mineral processing as well as the plastic compounding and agribusiness industries. The company's headquarters are in the United States with additional locations in the United Kingdom, Belgium, Germany, the Netherlands, France, and Japan.

== History ==
A pattern maker, Isaac Straub, began working on the company that is now known as ROTEX in 1837 when he had an idea for an improved grist mill. While working on his idea part-time, he applied for and received a patent for his new grist mill, The Queen of the South. In 1844, Straub created the Straub Mill Company to create the mills, mill supplies, bolting machines, and reels (flour sifter). Sales at this time ranged from Ohio to New Orleans.

At the age of 70, Straub sold his business to Robert Simpson in 1863, who changed the company name to Simpson & Gault. In 1866, Straub invented and patented an improvement to the Queen of the South mills. By the 1870s, the company had sold more than 4,000 Queen of the South mills. Straub died in 1875 at the age of 81. At age 25, Robert Simpson's son Orville assumed control of the company and changed the name to Straub Machinery Company.

In 1910, the company moved to its current plant on Knowlton Street in Cincinnati, Ohio. Also in that year, the company name was changed to The Orville Simpson Company. In 1912, a flour mill in Chillicothe, Ohio wanted a device to clean up flour after grinding. Lowe Simpson, Orville's son, designed and patented a new sifter for the mill. This invention, called ROTEX, lead to many orders.

The last Queen of the South mill was shipped in 1918, 74 years after its introduction. The new ROTEX Screener helped to save the company as grist mills were replaced by newer innovations. In 1935, the bouncing ball automatic screen cleaning was introduced by ROTEX and in 1939; Lowe Simpson became the president of the company.

Lowe Simpson retired in 1957 and his son, Jeremy, 25, followed as president. In 1974, the name of the company was changed to ROTEX, a name that was familiar to customers. In 1988, the first non-Simpson President in 124 years, Alex Young, became president of the company. In 1995, Bill Lower succeeded Alex Young as president.

In 2001, ROTEX purchased European Licensee, Locker Industries and Thomas Locker which were founded in the United Kingdom in 1879 and Belgium in 1959 respectively. In 2004, Bill Herkamp succeeded Bill Lower.

Hillenbrand purchased Rotex in August 2011. In 2014, Robert Dieckman became the ninth president since 1844, and the fifth non-Simpson family member to run the business. Rotex to this day continues to add innovative products including the minerals separator and the APEX screener line which emphasizes ergonomic benefits to the operator.

== Awards ==
In recognition for its contribution to the international export of the state of Ohio, Rotex was presented with the Ohio Governor's Excellence in Exporting Award (E-Award) in 1995 and 2004.

== Products ==
Rotex offers a variety of screeners and separators, particle size analyzers, and feeders and conveyors.
Screeners & Separators:
• APEX Screener
• ROTEX Gyratory Screener
• MEGATEX XD
• MEGATEX Screener
• Minerals Separator
• ROTEX Plastic Pellet Screener
• LIQUATEX Separator
• ULTRASONEX
• Direct Drive Screener

Particle Size Analyzers:
• GRADEX 2000 Particle Size Analyzer
• GRADEX 3000 Particle Size Analyzer
• GRADEX Chip Classifier

Feeders and Conveyors:
• SFH Feeder
• Direct Drive Feeder
• Direct Drive Conveyor

== Services ==
Rotex offers refurbishment services in addition to upgrading machines with newer technology. Additional services include drive-head exchange program, screen supply, fabricated parts, consumable parts, as well as factory service and support.
