= Ralph Greenhalgh =

Australian rules footballer

Personal information
- Full name: Ralph Horatio Greenhalgh
- Born: 8 May 1899; Broadford, Victoria
- Died: 24 December 1965 (aged 66); Kerang, Victoria

Playing career^{1}
Years	Club	Games (Goals)
1927–28	Footscray	30 (0)
- ^{1} Playing statistics correct to the end of 1928.

Ralph Horatio Greenhalgh (8 May 1899 – 24 December 1965) was an Australian rules footballer who played with Footscray in the Victorian Football League (VFL).
