= Eric Greenhalgh =

English cricketer

Eric Washington Greenhalgh (18 May 1910 – 2 July 1996) was an English cricketer active from 1933 to 1938 who played for Lancashire. He was born in Sale, Cheshire and died in Birkenhead. He appeared in 14 first-class matches as a righthanded batsman who bowled right arm medium pace. He scored 366 runs with a highest score of 53* and held two catches. He took three wickets with a best analysis of two for 75.
