= Abbot of Vale Royal =

Medieval abbey in Cheshire, England

Vale Royal Abbey is a medieval abbey, and later a country house, located in Whitegate, between Northwich and Winsford in Cheshire, England. During its 278-year period of operation, it had at least 21 abbots (possibly 22).

The abbey was founded in 1270 by Prince Edward for monks of the austere Cistercian order. Edward intended the abbey to be on the grandest scale. However, financial difficulties meant that these ambitions could not be fulfilled and the final building was considerably smaller than planned. The project ran into problems in other ways. The abbey was frequently grossly mismanaged, relations with the local population were so poor as to regularly cause outbreaks of large-scale violence on a number of occasions, and internal discipline was frequently bad.

Image	Name	From	To	Notes
	Walter	c. 1270		Probably oversaw the move from the original foundation at Darnhall to Vale Royal.
	Henry		c. 1275	Although these dates are given by the Victoria County History, nothing more—in fact, nothing at all—is known of this Henry, and it has been suggested that it was in fact a scribal error for Walter, above, and so may never have actually existed.
	John Chaumpeneys	c. 1275	c. 1289	First abbot of the re-sited Abbey.
	Walter of Hereford	c. 1294	c.1307	
	John of Hoo	c. 1308-9	c. 1314-15	
	Richard of Evesham	1316	1322	
	Peter	1322	1339	Murdered in office.
	Robert de Cheyneston	1340	1349	
	Thomas	1351	1369	
	Stephen	c. 1373	c. 1400	
	John	1405	1411	
	Thomas Oxenford	1414	1418	
	Henry Arrowsmith	1428	1437	Died in office.
	Thomas Kirkham	1438-9	1475	
	William Stratford	1476	1494	
	Thomas	1485	1496	
	William Stratford	1498	1504	
	Richard	1505		
	William Stratford	1509	1517	
	John Butler	1517	1529	Removed from office.
	William	1529		
	John Butler	1530	1535	Restored; died in office.
	John Hareware	1535	1538	(surname possibly Harwood) Surrendered the abbey during the dissolution.
