= Walter of Hereford (disambiguation) =

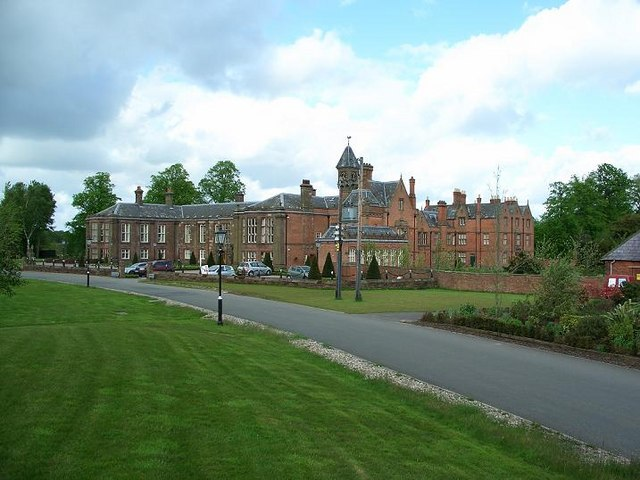
Vale Royal Abbey, linked to two Walters of Hereford

Walter of Hereford may refer to:

- Walter of Hereford, 12th century Baron Abergavenny
- Walter of Hereford, Abbot of Vale Royal, abbot of Vale Royal Abbey c.1294-c.1307
- Walter of Hereford (mason), English royal master mason fl.1278-1309, who confusingly designed Vale Royal Abbey
