= John of Hoo =

Abbot of Vale Royal Abbey (1308–09/1314–15)

John of Hoo was an early fourteenth-century Abbot of Vale Royal Abbey, Cheshire. His abbacy was from around 1308–09 to 1314–15.

"His surname was Hoo, which being interpreted means Rousing-up, for if one wants to rouse a man up, one calls out Hoo! that is to say : "Arise and make ready." And he was fittingly called Hoo, because he had been roused by the voice of God...

— The Ledger of Vale Royal

Hoo appears to have been something of a disciplinarian, even to point on occasion of expelling monks for the convent for their transgressions. He also continued his predecessor's feud with the Justice of Chester, Robert Holland, complaining that Holland repeatedly deprived the Abbey and its tenants of their forestry rights in Cheshire. Further, Hoo claimed, Holland also prevented him from exercising the Abbot's feudal jurisdiction over prisoners captured on the Abbey's own demesne lands. On the other hand, the Abbey's own chronicler described Hoo as a "good, gentle and simple" man. The financial problems of the Abbey—which had plagued its existence since its foundation (Note: For example: Although the Abbey had been granted a licence in 1275 to sell wool to pay for its building works, seven years' later the Abbey owed £172 to merchants)—increased under Hoo's guardianship, and a few years into his office, in 1311, £200 was still owed to one of the custodians of the works from 1284.

John of Hoo is one of the earliest Abbots of Vale Royal known to have explicitly resigned his office. He is also the only one of those who did whose reasons are known: not only his old age and infirmity, but also "the ill will of the common people," to whom he had made himself so unpopular. (Note: As part of the Abbey's original endowment, it received the manors of Darnhall and Over, Cheshire; this made the Abbots those places (and others) their feudal lords. As a result, there had been an intermittent but bitter dispute between Darnhall and Vale Royal Abbey since its creation, as tenants from the villages continually rejected their status as villeins and thus John of Hoo's overlordship.)

== See also ==
- Dispute between Darnhall and Vale Royal Abbey
