= Thomas Ragon, Abbot of Vale Royal =

Eighth Abbot of Vale Royal Abbey

Vale Royal Abbey in Cheshire.

Thomas Ragon was the eighth Abbot of Vale Royal Abbey, Cheshire. His term of office lasted from 1351 to 1369. His abbacy was predominantly occupied with recommencing the building works at Vale Royal—which had been in abeyance for a decade—and the assertion of his abbey's rights over a satellite church in Llanbadarn Fawr, Ceredigion, which was also claimed by the Abbot of Gloucester.

== Background ==
Vale Royal Abbey had been founded on its present site by King Edward I in 1277. Although intended to be the biggest and grandest Cistercian church in Christian Europe, building work was very much delayed (Edward had vowed to found the house in 1263, but recurring political crises, his own crusade, and the Second Barons' War prevented any work whatsoever taking place at least 1270). Work progressed until the 1280s when the abbey's construction was once again delayed by national events; this time, Edward's invasion of Wales. The King took not only the money that had been set aside for Vale Royal but also conscripted the masons and other labourers to build his Welsh fortifications. By the 1330s the monks had managed to complete the east end of the church.

Thomas Ragon was elected abbot of Vale Royal in 1351, two years after the death of his predecessor, Robert de Cheyneston. (Note: Interregna such as this were not uncommon in the administration of medieval ecclesiastical institutions. However, they could be dangerous to the abbey itself. It was not uncommon for "various unscrupulous (but generally nameless) individuals to treat properties of the abbey as their own;" worse, the abbey's lands and charters reverted to the King on the death of an abbot. The King had an unassailable regalian right to appoint a custos to govern the abbey in the King's name. During this period, the crown would garner the profits from the abbey, with a stipend being put aside for the sustenence of the monks and other essential inhabitants.)

== Rebuilding the abbey ==
In 1353, Edward the Black Prince wished to "continue and complete the work begun by his great-grandfather." For this purpose, Thomas was granted a tenth of Cheshire's 5,000 mark fine (which the county had previously agreed to pay in exchange for delaying the eyre), and he also provided another 500 marks when he visited Vale Royal in 1358. Thus, the Abbot was able to continue the building works on the Abbey as his predecessors had done; these works were expected to take six years. However, the following year, in October 1359, during a massive storm, much of the nave (including the new lead roof put in place by only the last abbot) was blown down and destroyed. The destruction was comprehensive, ranging "from the wall at the west end to the bell-tower before the gates of the choir," whilst the timber scaffolding collapsed "'like trees uprooted by the wind."

Repairs slowly took place over the next thirteen years, and it was undoubtedly Abbot Thomas who was responsible for the "unique chevet of seven radiating chapels" that were installed, although the overall stature of the remodelled church was smaller than before. Abbot Thomas had personally contracted with the Master Masons completing the work: they would build the church while he would organise the construction of twelve chapels—and pay for them. However, Thomas does not appear to have adhered to the terms of the contract, as only three years later, the Prince of Wales had to order him to do so.

== Royal service ==
"Emboldened by the revival of royal munificence the abbot and convent embellished their incomplete church with a chevet of thirteen chapels, alternately polygonal and four-sided, at the east end; unique in England, it is thought to derive from Toledo cathedral."

— Victoria County History

Thomas performed royal service when required (for example, in 1364 he took the fealty of John de la Pole) and also held a number of offices outside his abbacy. He was keeper of Aberystwyth Castle's gate, farmer of that town's subsidy, and rector of Llanbadarn Fawr, Powys, from early 1361. Under Thomas, the Abbey also received the advowsons of Lampeter and Llanbadarn Fawr church from a close advisor to Edward, the Black Prince. In 1360 these had been granted by King Edward III to the Prince of wales, who in turn granted them to members of his household—Peter Lacy, Richard Wolveston, John Delves and William Spridlington (Note: Spridlington was at this time Dean of St Asaph (1357–65) and was later Bishop of St Asaph (1376–82).)—who in turn "appropriated" (Note: The wording used by contemporaries to describe the process. The enrolment of 18 February 1361 says, that the Bishop of St David's, Thomas Fastolf, "in answer to their petition appropriates to the abbot and convent and their monastery the said parish church of Lampadervaure, with the chapels of Castel Walter, Lanelar, and Kellonrod, dependents of the same.") them to Abbot Thomas. (Note: This was not unusual. Those in possession of advowsons would often grant them to other ecclesiasts, with the expectation being that they would be better equipped to find a worthy incumbent, for which they received a pension from the profits of the advowson. In fact, more often than not, they would appoint a rector on a small stipend, and keep the bulk of the endowment for themselves. From the fourteenth century it became common practice to utilise this as a means of alleviating a religious house of its debts: The reign of Edward III, notes F. R. Lewis, saw 539 such instances.) This was with the Prince's blessing, as it was intended to be a royal donation towards restoring the church after its earlier partial destruction. Llanbadarn Fawr was a wealthy church, whose rector was no mere rector; the wealth of his church almost gave him abbatial status. (Note: Llanbadarn Fawr was a wealthy house: It had ten satellite chapels, and was worth £120 per annum.) Henceforth, Abbot Thomas and his successors were declared to be "henceforth the true abbot of the church." The abbey's own chronicle, The Vale Royal Ledger Book, states that "the abbot himself being present, all the men aforesaid and the other tenants did their fealty in full court and acknowledged the said abbot to be rector of Llabadarn Fawr and their lord." Abbot Thomas visited the church in 1361.

=== Dispute with Gloucester Abbey ===
The advowson of Llanbadarn Fawr church was to occupy much of Abbot Thomas' energies, as it became the locus of a dispute between Vale Royal and Gloucester Abbey, which later objected to the gift, as Llanbadarn Fawr had previously been a cell of Gloucester's. (Note: Although, it should be said, not since 1136. However, disputes such as this were not uncommon at Vale Royal; Ragon's predecessor, de Cheyneston, was in a similar dispute with Shrewsbury Abbey from almost the moment he took office (and which itself had begun in Robert's own predecessor's time and continued for three years, eventually costing Vale Royal £100 to settle.) The church was wealthy enough to make it worth quarrelling over: it controlled no less than ten chapels, and brought in an annual income of at least £120 per annum. Even though Vale Royal had received permission from the Bishop, the King and the Pope, Gloucester Abbey still objected, and the case was to drag on many years after Thomas' death 9not being resolved until 1399). The case was to cause ill-feeling within Vale Royal Abbey itself, as well as into North Wales. Even into the fifteenth century, Abbots of Vale Royal were unable to travel to Llanbadarn Fawr without fear of assault on occasions.

== Death ==
Abbot Thomas died in the summer of 1369, probably from pestilence, and in 1383 he was mentioned as being a "former" abbot around the time of the Black Prince. He was succeeded by Stephen, who, however, is not recorded in contemporary records as holding the office until 1374, so there may well have been another lengthy interregnum.
