= Dafydd ap Maredudd Glais =

Welsh cleric (c. 15th century)

Dafydd ap Maredudd Glais was a 15th-century Welsh cleric. He was also a civil official, a translator of a chronicle of the Kings of England into Welsh, and a convicted murderer. His name is first recorded in the Ministers’ Accounts for Cardiganshire, in 1429, associated with John Robury and Griffith Prouth (also described as clerics, assumed to belong to the church at Llanbadarn, regarding a pledge for Thomas Kirkham, abbot of Vale Royal. Dafydd is later recorded as having been convicted of the murder of Griffith Prouth but, being in holy orders, was fined rather than being condemned to death. Stripped of his orders, he then followed other members of his family in municipal service, and is later recorded as being provost of Aberystwyth. In 1444 he wrote his own translation of the Historia Regum Britanniae from Latin into Welsh.
