= John Chaumpeneys, Abbot of Vale Royal =

John Chaumpeneys was the last Abbot of Darnhall Abbey and first Abbot of Vale Royal Abbey, Cheshire, from around 1275 to circ 1289.

Chaumpeneys was the first Abbot of Vale Royal following its relocation from Darnhall, where he had been elected at Michaelmas in either 1274 or 1275.

"He was not unworthy of this name of John, or of the grace of God, and of this surname of Chaumpenays, who by the grace of God bore himself, and he justly deserves the title of Champion of Christ...

– The Ledger of Vale Royal

Chaumpeneys was said by the Abbeys' chronicler to have been a stalwart in the defence of his house, overthrowing those enemies who tried to attack.

Wool exports were, like its predecessor at Darnhall, the Abbey's main source of income. In 1283, Chaumpeneys acknowledged receipt of 53s 6d 8p as an advance on the Abbey's eventual delivery of twelve sacks of collecta. This was paid to Chaumpeneys on the proviso that it was put to the "common profit of his house." Chaumpenays had been trading with this particular merchant—John Wermond of Cambrai—since at least 1275 when he sold twelve sacks of wool to Wermond in London for eighty shillings.

In 1277 the foundation stone was laid at the altar of the new abbey. Edward, the Queen, their son Alphonso (Note: Alphonso was King Edward's and Eleanor of Castile eighth child but, by 1277, their only surviving son; he was, therefore, at this time, heir to the throne.) and members of the King's retinue then laid subsequent stones, (Note: This retinue included the Earls of Gloucester, Cornwall, Surrey, and Warwick, Maurice de Craon, Otto de Grandson and Robert de Vere) after which Chaumpeneys performed a celebratory Mass.

Chaumpeneys is known to have attended the Parliament held at Westminster from May—June 1278, and to have signed off a quitclaim to the King on 26 May. (Note: This was witnessed and signed by a number royal and noble officials and later enrolled in the Charter Rolls.) He also spent long periods in attendance upon the King at court, such as between 1285 and 1286. In April 1283 he was in Conwy, assisting in the transference of the Abbey to Aberconwy. It is likely as a result of his presence there that he took part in the King's "momentous progress" from York, the following year, joining the entourage at Tarporley. Chaumpenays witnessed "events which shaped the course of English history": the promulagation of the Statute of Rhuddlan in March that year, and the birth of the future Prince of Wales and King Edward II in Caernarfon in April.

== See also ==
- Dispute between Darnhall and Vale Royal Abbey
