= Richard of Evesham, Abbot of Vale Royal =

Richard of Evesham (occasionally of Eynsham) (Note: The Victoria County History, however, in its list of Abbots of Vale Royal, misnames Abbot Richard as a "Robert of Evesham", presumably erroneously, as the V. C. H. text—like the contemporary chronicle—consistently refers to this abbot as Richard.'"`UNIQ--ref-00000002-QINU`"') was Abbot of Vale Royal from 1316 to 1342.

"Richard de Evesham, who from the flower of his youth up had loved his Creator with all his heart, and at length succeeded in winning from God the better part, which, like Mary, he had chosen. Well did he hide his virtues under a bushel..."

– The Ledger of Vale Royal

The Vale Royal chronicler praises Abbot Richard in the same tones he had Richard's predecessor. He certainly had a reputation for religious devotion; but these were troubled times on at least two accounts. Firstly, a period of national famine began the same year as his election. (Note: The famine lasted until 1318, when successively good harvests began again.'"`UNIQ--ref-0000000A-QINU`"') Further, he faced the same, continuing, local disorder from a seething populace as his predecessors had. This dispute had been ongoing since the 1270s, and generally coalesced around the Abbot of Vale Royal's tenantry denouncing their Abbot as a cruel and unscrupulous landlord, and their concomitant rejection of his claims to feudal lordship over them. By Abbot Richard's time, this had increased in bitterness on his tenantry's behalf that on one occasion, whilst travelling around the villages collecting the Church's tithes, he was personally attacked. And 1320 saw not just further violence but bloodshed: one of the Abbey's monks was assaulted in Tarvin, and in Darnhall, a servant of Abbot Richard was killed. In this particularly barbarous episode, having killed the man, the malefactors cut his head off and played football with it.

== See also ==
- Dispute between Darnhall and Vale Royal Abbey
