= Peter, Abbot of Vale Royal =

14th-century English Cistercian abbot

Chester – red.
Vale Royal Abbey –green
Villages under abbey's feudal lordship – orange.

Peter (in office from 1322; died 1339/1340) was an English Cistercian abbot who served as the fifth abbot of Vale Royal Abbey, Cheshire, in the first half of the 14th century. He is generally held to be the author of the abbey's own chronicle, which was published in 1914 as the Ledger of Vale Royal Abbey. Owing to a failure to finish the abbey's building works—which had commenced in 1277 and had been intermittently ongoing ever since—the abbey was unsightly, and the monks' quarters probably near derelict. Abbot Peter oversaw the transplantation of the house onto new grounds. Much of his career, however, was focussed on defending his abbey's feudal lordship over its tenants. The dispute between the abbey and its tenantry had existed since the abbey's foundation; the abbot desired to enforce his feudal rights, the serfs to reject them, as they claimed to be by then freemen. This did not merely involve Abbot Peter defending the privileges of his house in the courts. Although there was much litigation, with Abbot Peter having to defend himself to the Justice of Chester and even the King on occasion, by 1337 his discontented villagers even followed him from Cheshire to Rutland. A confrontation between Abbot Peter and his tenants resulted in the death of a monastic servant and his own capture and imprisonment. With the King's intervention, however, Abbot Peter and his party were soon freed.

Abbot Peter's quarrels were not with just his tenantry. He was engaged in a long-running lawsuit with the abbot of Shrewsbury—for which he was summoned to appear before the archbishop of York, and successfully defended himself—over Vale Royal's claim to the advowson of the church of Kirkham. He was also involved in a feud of some description with the local gentry. This, it seems, was to be fatal. Little is known of this dispute, but, as a result of the feud—still attempting to defend his abbey and its rights as he perceived them to be—in 1340 he was killed during an incursion in which many monastic buildings and goods were burnt. He was succeeded as the abbot of Vale Royal by Robert de Cheyneston.

== Background ==
Vale Royal Abbey had been founded on its present site by King Edward I in 1277. Although intended to be the biggest and grandest Cistercian church in Christian Europe, building work was very much delayed (Edward had vowed to found the house in 1263, but recurring political crises, his own crusade, and the Second Barons' War prevented any work whatsoever taking place at least until 1270). Work progressed until the 1280s when the abbey's construction was once again delayed by national events, this time Edward's invasion of Wales. The King took not only the money that had been set aside for Vale Royal but also conscripted the masons and other labourers to build his Welsh fortifications. By the 1330s the monks had managed to complete the east end of the church.

== Ecclesiastical career ==
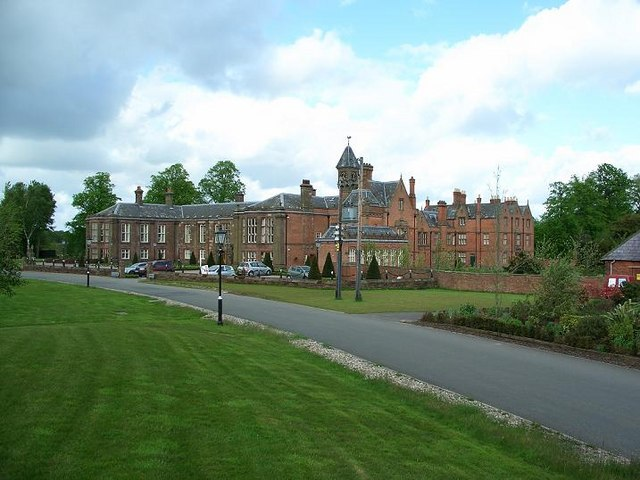
The site of Vale Royal Abbey in 2005. Although cultivated parkland today, in Abbot Peter's day this was within the Forest of Mondrem.

Abbot Peter has been described as "the most noteworthy of his line." It may well have been he, around 1338, who authored—or at least began—the chronicle known as the Ledger Book. (Note: This is based on some textual indications but also, said John Brownbill, who edited it for publication in 1914, the fact that it was clearly written by someone who on the one hand had access to oral histories on the earliest days of the abbey but without personal knowledge, combined with mentions of buildings which had been built by then (and, perhaps even more significantly, the omission of mention of structures built after 1340).) This recorded not only a history of the abbey and its abbots until 1338, but also contained the abbey's litigation records and papal bulla granted to the Cistercians. Abbot Peter was also responsible for re-siting Vale Royal in 1330, which was deemed necessary because the old quarters (which the house had occupied since 1281) had become, says the Ledger, "unsightly and ruinous" but the abbey had been so short of funds to carry out its original building works (Note: Indeed, they appear to have been in a perennial state of penury; the abbey's annual income from its estates and endowments was £248 17s, of which £200 was necessary expenditure (maintenance, repairs, wages, expenses and hospitality for visitors, for example) and only the remaining £48 17s to provide for the Abbot and twenty monks annually.) that much of the church and convent buildings were still incomplete. The Abbot reported in 1336 that the vaults, the roof or the windows of the church had yet been finished, (Note: On top of these major works, the Abbot reported that "the cloister, chapter-house, dormitory, refectory, and other monastic offices still remain to be built in proportion to the church.") and was forced to ask the General Chapter for financial assistance.

Around late 1327 or early 1328, (Note: "Shortly after the death of Edward II," in fact, which is generally credited to have occurred during the night of 21 September 1327.) Abbot Peter was sued by Shrewsbury Abbey for the sum of 500 marks. This was related to the ongoing dispute over the advowson of Kirkham Church, Lancashire, which had arisen during the abbacy of Peter's predecessor, Walter of Hereford. The advowson had originally belonged to Shrewsbury in the twelfth century, but in 1196 it had been acquired—through litigation—by Theobald Walter. (Note: Theobald Walter was brother to the then Archbishop of Canterbury, Hubert Walter.) It had been granted, however, by Edward I to Vale Royal as part of its endowment. Theobald Butler, (Note: The Theobald Butler of Abbot Peter's day is, confusingly, sometimes also referred to as Theobald Walter.) a descendant of Walter's, continued to press his family's claim to Kirkham. In defence of the abbey's rights to that church, Walter of Hereford had managed not only to get Edward II to confirm his father's grant to the abbey, but also to persuade the pope to confirm it as being in possession for perpetuity. This had been taxed at £160 in the 1270s, but by the time of Peter's abbacy its value had halved to £80.

Notwithstanding these confirmations, Abbot Peter was summoned to appear before the Archbishop of York, to demonstrate under what grant or law Vale Royal held Kirkham. He attended the hearing armed with a great deal of written evidence (in the form of charters) and witnesses. The fact that the abbot was forced to publicly defend his rights to his superior may well be a reflection on weaknesses in the wording of the original grant. "Even the Abbey's own chronicler," said historian Peter Coss "cast some doubt on the justice" of the grant. Although Shrewsbury's clam was for eight years' rents from Kirkham church (twelve marks annually), Peter was unable to obtain the dismissal of the suit (or other "favourable termination"). Although Peter managed to redeem "that writ and many others" from the Sheriff of Lancashire, Shrewsbury's case was not settled until after Peter's death.

In 1337 Abbot Peter became involved in a dispute with Sir William Clifton over the church's tithes from the villages of Clifton and Westby, from which Peter claimed that Sir William had unlawfully taken twenty marks (or, it has been suggested, because the Abbot refused to sell the tithes to Clifton). Peter further accused the knight of taking the money with violence, threatening the rector of Kirkham church and physically preventing him from collecting what was due to the abbey, and sending his retainers to invade the church, stop the service, and hold up a baptism. Sir William also, said Peter, injured the rector's riding horse in what the Abbot described as a "ridiculous manner". He had also abducted Thomas, one of the Abbot's own clerks, and flagellated him through the streets of Preston. Thanks to the involvement of the Abbot of Westminster, who was the head of the Cistercian Order in England, Clifton was forced to surrender himself to the Abbot in supplication. Abbot Peter received his tithe money and an oath of good behaviour from the errant knight.

=== Feud with the villagers of Darnhall ===
Vale Royal Abbey had been unpopular with the local villagers, as its grants of local land—surrounding villagers claimed—impinged on their customary liberties. Relations between the abbey and its tenantry had always been tempestuous. In 1275, only a year after the abbey's foundation, tenants of Darnhall attempted to withdraw from paying the Abbot customs and services, (Note: Customs were a form of subsidy levied on the sale and marketing of goods, and services, in this context, refers to feudal services, such as rents and commuted agricultural work.) a position from which they would not withdraw, but rather pushed with increasing vigour for the next fifty years. Abbot Peter continued his predecessors' campaign to maintain the villeinage of his tenants; or, to put it another way, was "an energetic defender of the rights of his house." (Note: For example, the Ledger notes that "in the year 1329, on the feast of St. Gregory the Pope [12 March 1329–30] the Abbot Peter took from Randolph son of John, surnamed Horlepot, one burgage, because bond tenants cannot hold free land.") The tenantry initially relied on the law to obtain satisfaction, but finding Abbot Peter's political connections and influence too powerful, their campaign turned increasingly violent.

The tenants of Darnhall, joined by those of surrounding villages, took such umbrage with Abbot Peter's actions that in June 1337 a group of them even followed him across England. The Abbot had visited King Edward III at his King's Cliffe Hunting Lodge. Returning through Rutland, Abbot Peter and his party were accosted by the Cheshiremen (a "great crowd of the country people" reports the Ledger). The latter attacked, and in the melée that followed, the Abbot was "ignominiously taken," and his groom killed. The following day the King ordered the Abbot's release, which was swiftly complied with by his captors, who were themselves then imprisoned. In a curious episode, the King later ordered the Abbot to return to his rebellious tenantry (who by then had been released) the goods Peter had confiscated from them. Less curiously, perhaps, the Abbot refused to do so.

== Death ==
In the monastery of Vale Royal, Thomas de Venables ... present in person, satisfied the abbot and convent of the said monastery for the death of Lord Peter, the late abbot, and Brother Walter le Walche, a monk of the said monastery, and for other trespasses and injuries inflicted upon the said abbot and convent and their monastery.

— The Ledger Book of Vale Royal, 13 February 1344.

Although details of the exact circumstances of Abbot Peter's death—and the events leading up to it—are scarce, he is known (Note: Physically violent expressions of anti-clericalism such as this were not uncommon, and although Peter's is an extreme example, it was not even the only time an ecclesiast was killed. In 1309 a gang assaulted the Abbot of Cobermere burnt his house down and stole his goods, in which attack another monk was slain. In 1360 a gang armed with "swords, axes and arrows" assaulted the Abbot of Shap. In the 1430s, the Abbot of Folkestone was forcibly removed from his church by local people—in the middle of saying Mass—and was taken to a nearby cliff where his assailants threatened to throw him into the sea. And in the 1450s, Abbot Walter Mene of Abbey was repeatedly threatened with assault by a patron of his Abbey, Sir Henry Hussey.) to have been involved in a serious dispute with a member of the local gentry, Thomas de Venables. The cause of the dispute was almost certainly Abbot Peter's "single-minded defence" of his house's rights and prerogatives. Just before he was killed, a number of the Abbot's houses were destroyed, much of his harvest burnt, a quantity of goods stolen and some livestock killed. A fellow monk, Walter le Walche, or Walter Welch, died with him. This is no surprise; Welch had been a loyal associate of the Abbot, and had fought in his defence once before. In the conflict in Rutland three years earlier, when Welch had seen what was afoot, he had raced up from the rear of the party "like a champion sent from God" to defend the Abbot.

Abbot Peter was succeeded as Abbot by one of his monks, Robert de Cheyneston; by 1337, he was a senior official within Abbot Peter's administration.
