= John, Abbot of Vale Royal =

Abbot of Vale Royal Abbey

John was Abbot of Vale Royal Abbey, Cheshire, between 1405 and 1411, and although his abbacy seems to have been largely free of the local disorder that had plagued those of his predecessors, the Abbey appears to have been taken in to King Henry IV's hands on at least two occasions (in 1405 and 1408). (Note: Almost nothing is known of Vale Royal Abbey or the activities of its Abbots for the first decade or so of the fifteenth century. Most of the major texts (for example, the Victoria County History, George Ormerod's The History of the County Palatine of Cheshire, Edward Baines' The History of the County Palatine of Lancashire, and even the Abbey's own Ledger book chronicle) skip from around the end of Stephen's abbacy to that of Henry Arrowsmith or Thomas Kirkham.)
