= Walter of Hereford (mason) =

English medieval master mason

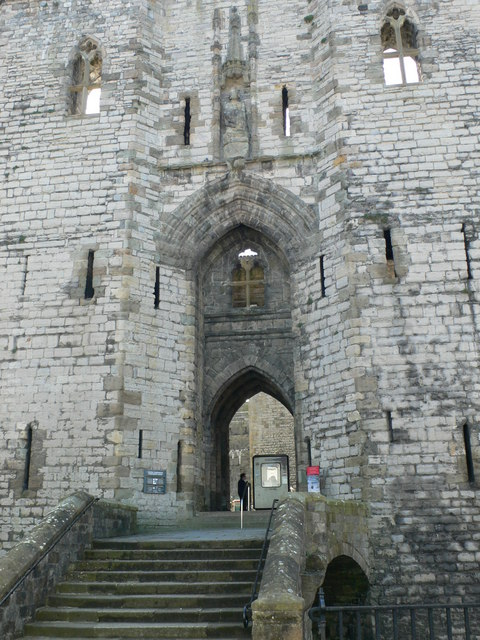
The King's Gate of Caernarfon Castle

Walter of Hereford, occasionally referred to as Walter of Amesbury (fl. 1278-1309) was an English medieval master mason, active in the building projects of Edward I in England, Wales and Scotland. His most significant works were Vale Royal Abbey (Cheshire), Caernarfon Castle (Gwynedd) and Greyfriars (London).

== Biography ==
Historian John Harvey considered him to have been born in Harford, in the parish of Naunton, Gloucestershire. He was first recorded in 1278, when he contracted with Winchcombe Abbey to complete their "new work", probably the Lady Chapel. The contract also granted him leave to build a chamber for himself, for which the abbot would source the building materials, next to the abbey's granary. The abbey was entirely destroyed at the Dissolution. From 1278 to 1290 he worked on Edward I's foundation of Vale Royal Abbey. This was to have been a great house, with a church nearly the size of that at Westminster, but Edward's Welsh wars meant that funding was reduced, before Edward announced that he would rid himself of the abbey entirely in 1290. This church was also entirely demolished in the 16th century, but its plan has been revealed by excavation.

From around 1295, Walter was master mason of Caernarfon Castle. This had been started on a colossal scale in 1283, as the centrepiece of Edward's imperial project, but had been destroyed in Madog ap Llywelyn's rebellion of 1294. Walter was particularly responsible for the north front, separating the castle from the town, which had barely been begun before the rebellion. However, some historians, like John Goodall, consider that he was in charge of the building from the outset, as it is so different to Edward's other Welsh castles. In 1304, he was in Edinburgh, Perth and Stirling as part of Edward's invasion of Scotland. In 1306, he was working on Greyfriars Church in London. This was also a royal project, under the patronage of Queen Margaret. Walter died some time between November 1308 and February 1309.

== Style and significance ==
Walter of Hereford was one of the king's leading masons, active on both military and ecclesiastical projects, though only Caernarfon Castle has survived of his works. This means that he has been somewhat overshadowed by his contemporary James of St George, a Savoyard mason to whom much of Edward I's iron ring of castles has traditionally been ascribed, though this has since been reassessed. John Harvey described him as "apart from James of St. George, the principal mason-architect employed by the Crown" at this time.

His works at Caernarfon and Vale Royal show experimentation with polygonal plans, a feature of the contemporary Decorated Gothic style. Caernarfon also introduced a new, heavier aesthetic, characterised by broad wave mouldings and regarded as particularly suitable for subsequent castles. At Caernarfon, the polygonal towers and banded masonry evoke Roman architecture, like the pharos at Dover, supporting Edward's claim to be the overlord of all Britain. The post-1295 north curtain at Caernarfon lacks the Roman-style banding, but introduces innovative arrowslits, where three crossbowmen could fire at once. The King's Gate would, if completed, have been the greatest castle gatehouse in Britain, with a passage defended by an unprecedented five portcullises and six doors opening into a vaulted octagonal hall. A very similar gatehouse was built at Denbigh Castle, and may also have been designed by Walter. The use of polygonal towers was very influential, being seen not just in Wales, but in other buildings like the south tower of Stokesay Castle and the great tower of Knaresborough Castle. The church of Greyfriars was also much-imitated. It had an unusual Hallenkirche form, in which the aisles were as high as the nave, which was repeated at important later medieval churches like St Thomas, Winchelsea and Hull Minster.

== Gallery ==
Plan of Vale Royal Abbey

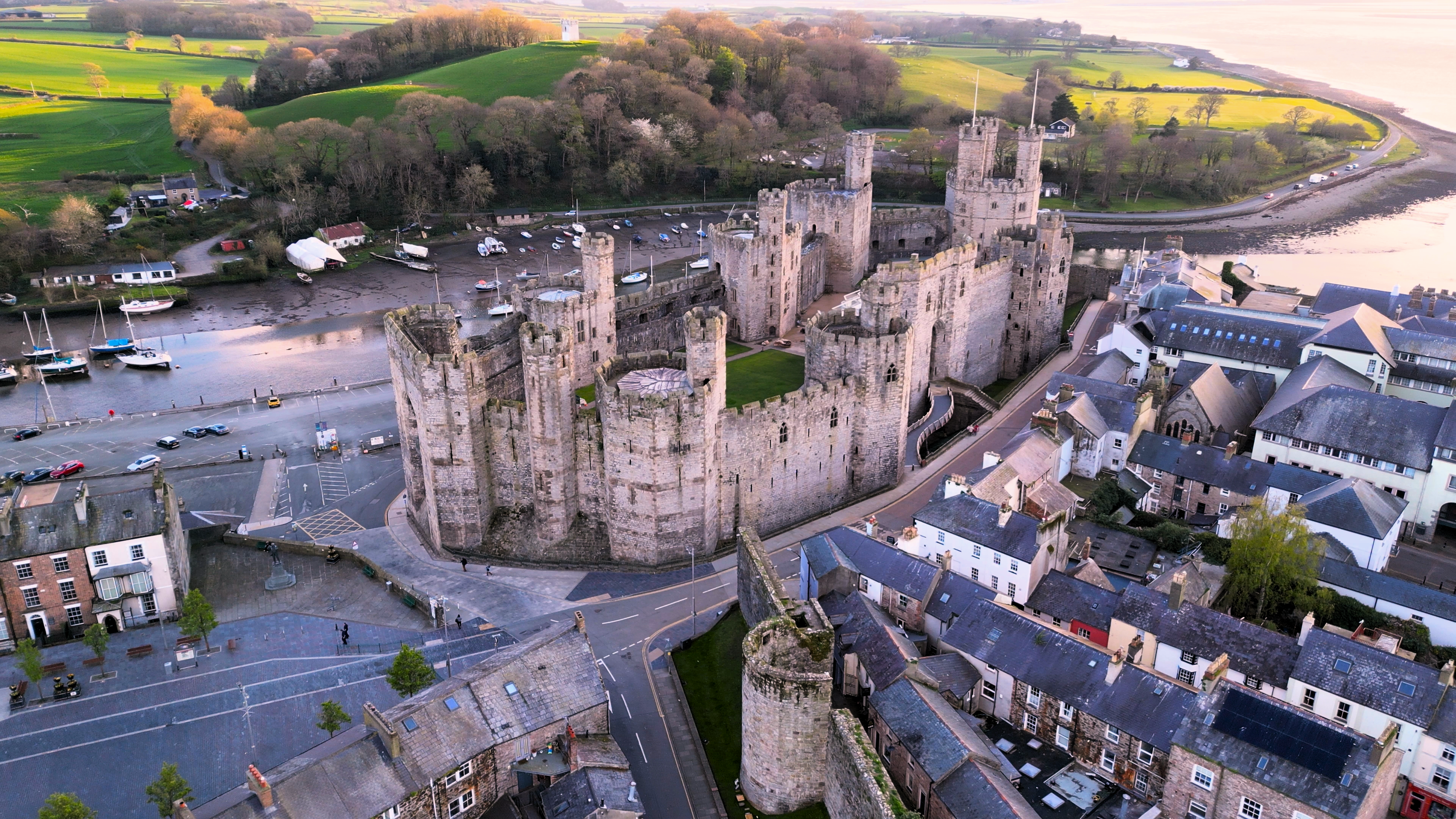
Aerial view of Caernarfon Castle

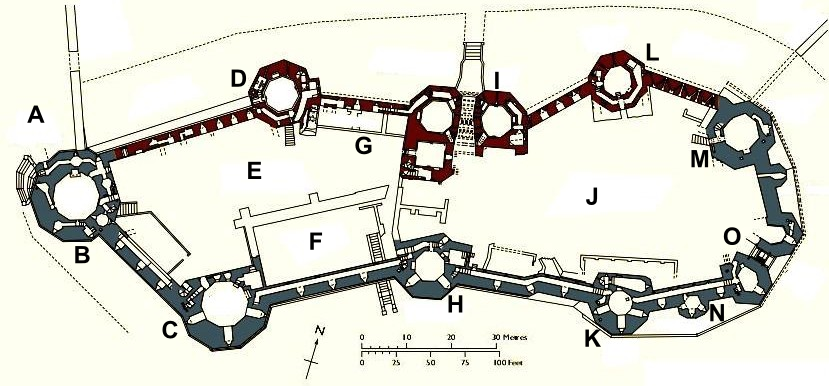
Plan of Caernarfon Castle. The parts shaded in brown are traditionally considered to be by Walter of Hereford.

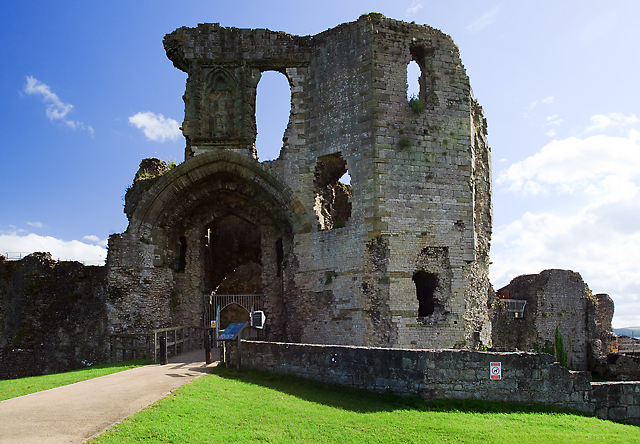
The gatehouse of Denbigh Castle

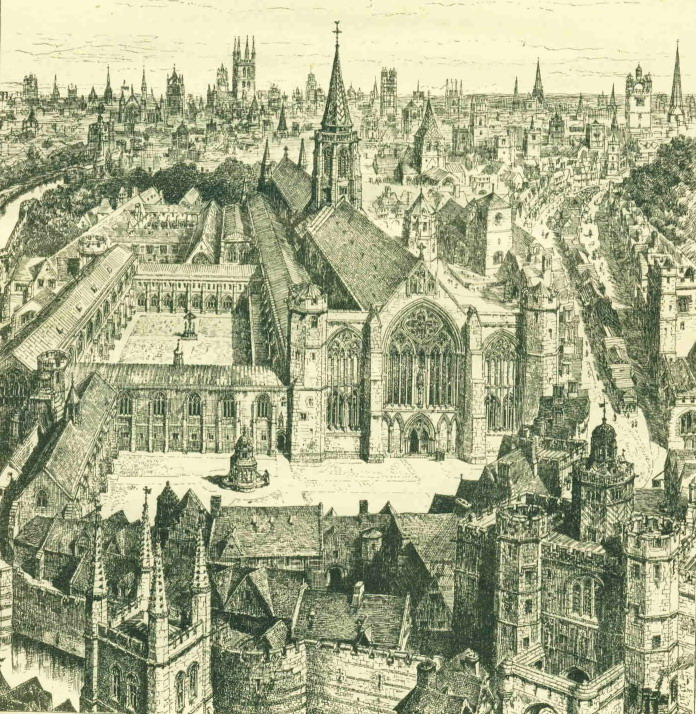
Greyfriars, London, as imagined by HW Brewer.
