= Walter of Hereford, Abbot of Vale Royal =

Abbot of Vale Royal Abbey in Cheshire

Walter of Hereford (also known as Walter of Dore) was a thirteenth- and fourteenth-century abbot of Vale Royal Abbey in Cheshire. He was Abbot from around 1294 to approximately 1307. His abbacy occurred at a time of tribulation for the abbey, mostly due to poor relations with the local populace.

Walter is in portrayed (perhaps unsurprisingly) in his Abbey's later chronicler in superlatives. He is described as "greatly venerable in life and always and everywhere devoted to God and the Blessed Virgin Mary" and as

A man of most beautiful appearance, as regards externals...and in good works also he fought a good fight for Christ, for he used a hair shirt to conquer the flesh, and by this discipline subdued it to the spirit. He rarely or never ate meat.

"For once it came to pass that the greater part of the district in which [Abbot Walter] dwelt, at the instance of a certain tyrant, then justiciar there, raised the standard of revolt against him and his monastery; and when he came into the court before the abovesaid tyrant, and had brought with him a great number of notable people, they were all struck with terror and fled, leaving the abbot, their lord, alone..."

— The Ledger of Vale Royal

A chronicle of Vale Royal Abbey—probably written in the 1330s—states that the early abbots were under almost continual assault from a disgruntled populace. Abbot Walter spent much of his tenure defending the rights and prerogatives of his house (even, in 1302, securing the rights to all the dead wood on the ground within Peak Forest and at the same time petitioning parliament for the payment of arrears needed to pay for the ongoing works at the Abbey). The Abbey were granted the rights to hold a five-day long market and fair at their Kirkham manor in 1287. This was disputed by a member of the local gentry, Sir Theobald Butler, who claimed the hereditary grant of the church at Kirkham (and therefore all the associated rights and rents) from the time of King Richard I. Walter also requested that the King inform the Justices of the Eyre to aid the Abbey in its enforcement of its previous royal charters and successfully proved his Abbey's rights to the Kirkham fair and market before a commission of Quo Warranto. Abbot Walter also, for good measure, obtained from Otton de Grandson—the English Ambassador to St Peter's—Papal confirmation that the advowson of Kirkham was vale Royal's in perpetuity. As Peter Coss has said, however, even "the Abbey's own chronicler cast some doubt on the justice" of the original grant. Abbot Walter was also able to hold back an armed force that tried to force its way through the Abbey precinct.

Abbot Walter continued to maintain the Abbey's claim to villeinage over the local tenantry as his predecessors had, for example in 1307, when one Richard Payne declared himself to be a freeman, and not a nativi of the Abbot as feudal lord. (Note: Payne claimed instead that his ancestor came from Shropshire during the time of "Randle", Earl of Chester, where they were free.) He also robustly defended his house against the King's own local Justiciar (whom the Abbey's chronicler labels a "tyrant") (Note: And successfully defend Vale Royal against the Justice he did: the latter was fined £200 by Edward I, a massive sum payment of which was only cancelled to that Justice's successor.)

A mention of Walter in the Calendar of Fine Rolls confirms him to have been still living in November 1311, but as being by now a former Abbot.

== See also ==
- Dispute between Darnhall and Vale Royal Abbey
