= Stephen, Abbot of Vale Royal =

14th-century abbot

Stephen (died after May 1414), was a late 14th-century abbot of Vale Royal Abbey in Cheshire. He is believed to have been born c. 1346, and in office from 27 January 1373 to possibly 1400, although the precise date of his departure is unknown. One of the earliest mentions of him as Abbot is 1373, when he received the homage of Robert Grosvenor for the manor of Lostock. He witnessed a charter between the prior of the Augustinian hermits in Warrington and the convent there in 1379. A few years later, Abbot Stephen provided evidence for the Royal Commission that was enquiring into the case of Scrope v Grosvenor, which sat for three years, concluding its business in 1389.

The manor of Weverham...in the which Stephen, abbot of Vale Royal, holds his court every fortnight, and he has there such liberty and jurisdiction, that if any trespass against the peace is committed within the said manor, as well by the tenants dwelling therein as by others, he can both arrest the trespassers (or offenders) found within that manor, and inquire in his court aforesaid as to such trespass...

— The Ledger Book of Vale Royal Abbey, folio 44.

He seems, though, to have more-than-occasionally been on the other side of the law: Soon after his election as Abbot, in 1375, he was involved in violent fighting with the Bulkeley family of Cheadle, and in 1394, he gave sanctuary to a man already convicted of the murder of member of the Bostock family. He was also regularly accused of preventing the arrest or prosecution of members of his own household or Abbey when they were accused of offences as well as taking bribes to allow prisoners to escape. Further, he was accused—on what appears to be a fairly regular basis—of cutting down trees and selling the timber, to the detriment of the local forests. Not only was he accused of damaging the forests, however, but in 1395 an inquisition into the state of the Abbey and its estates concluded that over the previous yen years, Stephen had greatly impoverished the institution by selling, alienating, and generally destroying much of the Abbey's Darnhall estates. One particularly notorious incident occurred that same year when Vale Royal was expecting a visitation from the Abbots of Oxford, Croxden, and Dieulacres. They were attacked by a mob composed not only of vengeful members of the Bostock family, but also, two of Vale Royal's own monks. The latter were later accused respectively of theft and of rape.

Abbot Stephen was also performed royal service when required. He was a collector of the parliamentary subsidy of 1401 for King Henry IV; there appear to have been concerns of irregularities surrounding his activities on that occasion, as, fourteen years later, he received a royal pardon from Henry V. (Note: Stephen's pardon explicitly states that this was connected to the rebellions that plagued Henry IV's reign, particularly the early years: "Know ye that whereas Stephen, late abbot of Vale Royal in the diocese of Lichfield...was appointed collector of a tenth and a half, granted to Henry, late King of England, our father...although some sums of the money of the tenth and a half aforesaid could not be raised by the aforesaid late abbot on account of the rebellion then existing in the archdeaconry aforesaid.") Abbot Stephen was involved in much litigation, having, for example, two cases on hand simultaneously regarding the manor of Kirkham, Lancashire, in 1401. Although he is known to have taken office in 1373, the date he lost it is unknown, except that it was before May 1415, when he received his pardon, as the document describes him as being the "late" abbot. (Note: In comparison with the 20th century, in the middle ages, the word "late" was used to describe someone's previous, or recent, office or situation, rather than solely their death.) He seems, a recent study concluded, "to have been incapable of managing the finances of the house or of maintaining internal discipline."
