= Darnhall Abbey =

Medieval English Cistercian Abbey

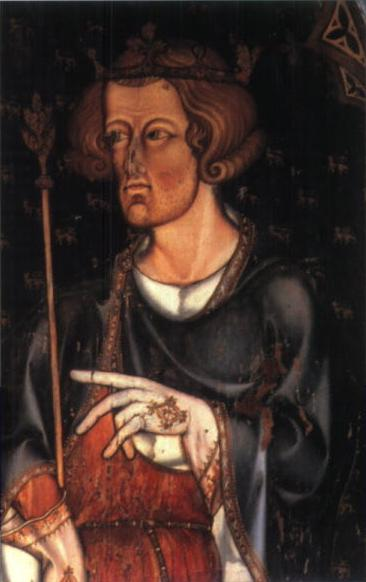
Possibly contemporary portrait of Darnhall Abbey's founder, King Edward I

Darnhall Abbey was a late-thirteenth century Cistercian abbey at Darnhall, Cheshire, founded by Lord Edward (later King Edward I) sometime in the years around 1270. This was in thanks, so tells the Abbey's chronicler, for God saving him and his fleet from a storm at sea. It was dedicated to St Mary. It only existed for a short time before it moved to the better-known Vale Royal Abbey. The site chosen for the Abbey at Darnhall was discovered to be unfit for its purpose. Money was short, as Edward did not provide enough for the original foundation, but the Abbey was allowed to trade wool to augment its finances. The Abbey relocated a few miles north, and what remained of Darnhall Abbey became the monastic grange of the new foundation. There was probably only ever one Abbot of Darnhall before the Abbey relocated in 1275.

== Foundation ==
Edward founded Darnhall Abbey, dedicated to St Mary, between 1266 and 1272, (Note: Although, as Janet Burton has noted, "The temptation to assign a 'foundation' date to any monastic house can be fraught with difficulties and disguises the lengthy nature of the process which led to any one settlement".) and its foundation charter is dated 14 January 1274. According to the Abbey's chronicler he decided to do so after returning from the Ninth Crusade. In the chronicler's romantic, (but "conventional") story, the King made his vow when he was Prince of Wales. (Note: This was an anachronism by the author—who was probably writing in the early 1330s—as the first Prince of Wales (the later King Edward II) was not born until 1284 and not made Prince until 1301.) Supposedly caught in extremely rough weather, which made the King and his entourage fear for their lives, Edward made a vow to the Virgin Mary promising to found an abbey in her name if they were saved. Almost immediately, says the chronicler, the seas calmed, and the ships returned peacefully to England. The moment the last man had stepped ashore, the chronicler continues, the storm broke out again, more violent than ever, and Edward's ship was smashed on the harbour. (Note: The chronicler describes the train of events in some detail: "while [Edward] was on his way to England, accompanied by a great concourse of people, storms suddenly arose at sea, the ship's rigging was all torn to pieces in a moment, and the crew were helpless and unable to do anything. Utterly despairing of their safety, the sailors called loudly upon the Lord...[Edward] most humbly vowed to God and the Blessed Virgin Mary that, if God would save him and his people and goods, and bring them safe to land, he would forthwith found a monastery of white monks of the Cistercian order in honour of Mary the Mother of God...for the maintenance of one hundred monks for ever. And behold, the power of God to save His people was forthwith made manifest; for scarce had the most Christian prince finished speaking when the tempest was utterly dispersed and succeeded by a calm, so that all marvelled at so sudden a change. Thus the ship...was miraculously borne to land by the Virgin Mary, in whose honour the prince had made his vow, without any human aid whatsoever...until they had all carried their goods safe out of the ship, the prince remained behind them in the ship, but as soon as the ship was empty, he left it and went on shore; and as he left, in the twinkling of an eye, the ship broke into two pieces.") However, these dates do not fit with what is known: King Edward only went on crusade once, in 1270, not returning until his father Henry III died in 1272. By this time, of course, Darnhall Abbey's foundation charter had already been granted. This charter did indeed make mention of the King being at "sometime in danger upon the sea", and it has been suggested by a recent biographer of the King, that it refers to a stormy Channel crossing in the 1260s. (Note: Sir James Ramsay was even more specific, dating the particular crossing involved to between Christmas and New Years, 1263, when he sailed from Calais to Dover ahead of his father, who is known to have travelled on 2 January 1264) Michael Prestwich, has, however, noted a crusader connection for Edward's new foundation. The first charter concerned with the project is dated four years' earlier than the foundation charter, in August 1270. This was just before Edward left on crusade, so it is likely that he founded it as a request—not for rescue, but for protection in the future.

Chester – red.
Vale Royal abbey –green
Darnhall Abbey – orange.

=== Beginnings ===
Monks were brought from other, generally nearby, abbeys (particularly Dore Abbey), and it seems that a group was in residence at Darnhall from around 1268. Dore was probably chosen because, from 1264 to 1265, the young Lord Edward was imprisoned there by Simon de Montfort during the Second Barons' War, and the monks there were said to have looked after him well.

The monks were allowed to choose the site upon which to build Edward's new Abbey. As its endowment, the Abbey was granted the site of the establishment in Delamere Forest; the manors of Darnhall, Cheshire, and Langwith in the East Riding of Yorkshire, and the advowsons of Frodsham, Weaverham, and Ashbourne and Castleton. Although the Abbey was originally intended to house 100 monks, the endowment was insufficient to afford this number, and thirty monks became the standard.

Edward was in no rush to complete the Abbey, although any plans he had in 1263 were postponed by the Barons' War, which involved several periods of both imprisonment and warfare for Edward. But even eight years later, in 1271, his father King Henry III was still appealing for other abbeys and convents around the country to donate theological works to the new establishment that—Henry's appeal said—Edward had by then "begun to found". Whatever the precise year of the monks' arrival at Darnhall, they do not seem to have been welcome from the start. By 1275, the Abbey's feudal tenantry in Darnhall village tried to withdraw the services and customs the Abbey claimed from them. This was only the beginning of a struggle between the two parties that was to continue for the next half-century.

=== Economy ===
"...The decision to found a great Cistercian house gave [King Edward] protection, and also renown, in his international venture.

— Jeffrey Denton

For the few years of its operation, the wool trade was the Abbey's primary source of income. In 1275, for example, the abbey was authorised to gather twelve sacks of collecta (Note: This was wool that monastic houses were authorised to collect (hence, collecta) from outside their own walls, but which had to be of the same quality as the wool they produced. This was emphasised as the wool would be produced by others, not under the direct control of the abbey which would have to sell it.) (as good as that collected by their nearest rival, Dore Abbey in Herefordshire), ready for examination and preparation by a merchant's agent (for whom of course the Abbey had to supply board and lodging). The wool was finally transported to a port—again at the Abbey's expense—until being shipped to the Continent.

== Closure ==
Soon after 1275, it was decided that Darnhall Abbeys' location was unsuitable, for a now-unknown reason. King Edward allowed the monks to choose a new one (anywhere "out of all the kingdom of England"). They did not, though, move far: four miles only. They chose their new site near Darnhall, called Wetenhalewes, (Note: Vale Royal is recorded in the Calendar of Charter Rolls under this name, in 1279.) four miles to the north of its original site. The new Abbey was named Vale Royal. What remained of the Darnhall buildings became Vale Royal's monastic grange.

== Abbots of Darnhall ==
The first Abbot of Darnhall was named Walter, whose tenure was during the last years of the reign of King Henry III. (Note: Although Walter is, confusingly, referred to as Henry in Harleian MS 2072, fo. 50, hence the subsequent suggestion by historians that there was an Abbot Henry after Walter.) There are almost no references to him by contemporaries, except one brief mention in the Chester plea rolls. Although Walter's dates are so vague as to allow for nothing more precise than the end of Henry III's reign, he may have been succeeded by an Abbot Henry (surname also unknown). Due to the sheer lack of evidence for Henry's existence, it is likely that Henry was a scribal error for Walter, and that in fact, the first Abbot was the only one until around 1273. Either way, by the time the next Abbot, John Chaumpeneys, was consecrated in 1275, the Abbey of Darnhall had relocated to Vale Royal.

== See also ==
- Dispute between Darnhall and Vale Royal Abbey
