= Peter Coss =

British historian

Peter R. Coss is a British historian, specialising in the history of the English medieval gentry. He is Emeritus Professor of Medieval History at the School of History, Archaeology, and Religion at Cardiff University, Wales. His research interests also include 12th- to 15th-century English social history and Italian history from the same period, as well as visual history/social display and literature and history. As of 2008, he was working on a comparative project between the English gentry and the nobility of Tuscany, and another on the foundations of gentry culture. Coss studied under Rodney Hilton. He is a member of the historical journal Past & Present, and also a former member of the council of the Royal Historical Society.

== Select publications ==
- The Origins of the English Gentry. Past and Present Publications. Cambridge, Cambridge University Press (2003). ISBN 0-521-82673-X
- With Maurice Keen (eds.) Heraldry, Pageantry and Social Display in Medieval England. Woodbridge, Boydell (2002). ISBN 978-1-84383-036-8
- The Lady in Medieval England, 1000-1500. Stroud, Sutton (1998). ISBN 0-7509-0802-5
- The Knight in Medieval England. Woodbridge, Boydell (1993). ISBN 0-7509-0059-8
- Lordship. Knighthood and Locality. Past and Present Publications. Cambridge, Cambridge University Press. (1991) ISBN 0-521-40296-4
