= Robert de Cheyneston, Abbot of Vale Royal =

Robert de Cheyneston was Abbot of Vale Royal Abbey, Cheshire between 1340 and 1349. De Cheyneston had already been a monk at the Abbey (and by 1337, a senior official within the administration) before his election as Abbot.

Robert, perceiving that all the trouble and caution of his predecessor had been of no avail, made a vigorous opposition to the abbot of Shrewsbury, in London and elsewhere, in the cause aforesaid, and laboured arduously on behalf of his monastery.

— The Ledger Book of Vale Royal, fo. 36, 1341.

Much of his Abbacy was punctuated with financial expense and outlays. De Cheyneston calculated that his house had at least £20 in debts. The same year he took office De Cheyneston's abbatial finances suffered for the first—but not last—time. Some of the Abbey's granges burnt down, (Note: These were at Bradford, Hefferton, and Knighton.'"`UNIQ--ref-00000008-QINU`"') which not only meant that they lost all the corn that was being stored in them when it happened, but also had to go and purchase more corn to live on until the next harvest. Around the same time de Cheyneston was indicted before the King's escheator over a matter of his unlicensed acquisition of twelve burgages of land in the village of Over. For this, he paid a fine of £10 and received both a pardon for the offences and a license for his new lands. Soon after, a curious episode took place, the exact nature of which is unknown (except that it involved the deaths of two local men, Robert Hykes and John Bulderdog). In any case, the result of which was that two of de Cheynestone's monks were later (Note: "Falsely" says the Abbey's own chronicle, perhaps unsurprisingly.'"`UNIQ--ref-0000000B-QINU`"') indicted for the killings and for which they in turn paid a £10 fine, and another £10 to the Court of Common Pleas.

De Cheynestone was concerned with an ongoing legal-dispute between Vale Royal and Shrewsbury Abbey from almost the moment he took office, which had begun in Abbot Peter's—Robert's predecessor's— time. On Peter's death in 1340, the Abbot of Shrewsbury simply presented de Cheynston with another writ of scire facias, and the dispute continued with "many allegations of each party." It was not settled until 1343, when de Cheyneston settled the Abbot of Shrewsbury's expenses for £100.

Abbot de Cheyneston continued the building works which had been on-going, but which, due to a perennial state of penury, had never been completed in the fifty years since the Abbey's foundation. The monks own quarters—which were meant to have been temporary refuges while the building work took place—were also dilapidated. He managed, with the slender resources at his disposal, to give the choir and north end of the church a lead roof in the first two years of his reign (Note: At a cost of £100.'"`UNIQ--ref-00000012-QINU`"') but could not afford to have any further substantial work carried out.

Robert de Cheyneston was succeeded as Abbot of Vale Royale by one Thomas, although Thomas was not to be elected until 1351.
