= Dispute between Darnhall and Vale Royal Abbey =

English medieval regional feud

- Chester – red
- Vale Royal Abbey – green
- Villages under the abbey's feudal lordship – orange

In the early fourteenth century, tensions between villagers from Darnhall and Over, Cheshire, and their feudal lord, the Abbot of Vale Royal Abbey, erupted into violence over whether they had villein—that is, servile—status. The villagers argued not, while the Abbey believed it was due the villagers' feudal service.

Founded by Edward I in 1274, the Cistercian Abbey had been unpopular with locals from the start. This was primarily because it had been granted, in its endowment, exclusive forest rights which surrounding villages saw as theirs by custom, and other feudal dues they did not believe they had to pay. Moreover, the rigorous enforcement of these rights by successive abbots was felt to be excessively harsh. The villagers resented being treated as serfs and made repeated attempts to reject the Abbey's feudal overlordship.

The villagers' efforts ranged from appeals to the Abbot, the King's Chief Justice in Cheshire and even to the King and Queen; the latter, at least, appears to have been somewhat sympathetic to their cause. On each occasion, though, the villagers were unsuccessful and were unable to secure release from their villeinhood. The abbots, for their part, may have had significant financial pressures on them. Their house had commenced major building works in 1277, but then lost much of its early royal funding following Edward I's invasion of Wales the same year, which diverted both his money and masons from them. This may have accounted for the strict enforcement of their rights. Their tenants' struggle turned increasingly violent from 1326.

The dispute was mainly led by the villagers of Darnhall, in conjunction with their neighbours, particularly those from the nearby village of Over. On several occasions they suffered imprisonment when their appeals failed, and they were also often fined. On one occasion, in an attempt to appeal to Abbot Peter, the villagers of Darnhall and Over followed him to King's Cliffe Hunting Lodge, where the Abbot was meeting the King. Peter was himself appealing for royal assistance against his recalcitrant tenantry. The villagers met him in Rutland on his return journey; an affray broke out, the Abbot's groom was killed, and Peter and his entourage were captured. The King soon intervened and released him; the Abbot then promptly had the villagers imprisoned again. Abbot Peter did not confine himself to confronting his serfs. He also engaged in feuds with the local gentry, and either at their hands or those of his erstwhile tenants, he was murdered in 1339. Nothing is known of any resolution to the dispute, but serfdom was in decline nationally and Peter's successor may have had other local troubles occupying his attention.

== Background ==
The Cistercian Abbey of Vale Royal, in the Weaver Valley, was originally founded by the Lord Edward — later King Edward I — in 1274, in gratitude for his safe passage through a storm on the return from crusade. Originally intended to be a grand, cathedral-style structure with a complement of 100 monks, building started in 1277 under the King's chief architect, Walter of Hereford. It soon fell victim to the financing of Edward I's Welsh wars. The King's lengthy campaigns meant that both money and stonemasons were diverted from the construction of the Abbey, to the construction of new castles in Wales. (Note: The Justiciar of Chester was enjoined to "cause 100 suitable masons experienced in such work as the King is engaged upon at Kaernaruan to be chosen in the town of Chester and in other parts within his bailiwick, and cause them to come with their tools to Kaernaruan without delay, there to do what Edmund the King's brother shall enjoin upon them, as the King needs masons for his works there at once". Kaernaruan was the medieval Latin name for Caernarfon, Wales.) This made not only its future expansion, but its very existence, precarious.

Vale Royal's abbots were not just local religious leaders; they were also feudal lords and as such not necessarily sympathetic landlords. When their tenants appeared before the manorial court, for example, they were not appearing before an abbot, but before a judge, and common law applied. Historians Christopher Harper-Bill and Carole Rawcliffe have highlighted the ruthlessness of religious landlords in the Middle Ages, noting their skill in "exploiting every source of income" and the unpopularity this brought on them. (Note: In the previous century, Peter of Blois had written that, in his view It is detestable in a monk that, under any custom of colour, or honour, or title of power, he should possess feudal rights and bondmen and bondwomen, or homages and fealties and allegiances, or that he should lay forced labour upon them, and extra-services and other burdens of public works. Further, should he possess any of these things, they should not contribute to the easing of his own burden.) As the medievalists Gwilym Dodd and Alison McHardy have emphasised, "a religious house, like any other landlord, depended on the income from its estates as the main source of its economic wellbeing", and from the late twelfth century, monastic institutions were "particularly assiduous in... seeking to tighten the legal definition of servile status and tenure" for its tenantry.

Disputes between religious houses and their tenants were not uncommon. To the south of London, one such feud between the tenants of Tooting and Bec Abbey (the French Abbey had been given possessions in Tooting Bec) had also gone from litigation to outright violence and law-breaking, and it lasted many years. Likewise, Bec Abbey's tenants in Ogbourne St George, Wiltshire, launched a well-organised peasant's revolt in 1309, which also found some support amongst local gentry. In East Anglia, the tenants of Bury St Edmunds Abbey revolted against the Abbot in 1327 in a struggle similar to that of the villagers of Darnhall and Over. That Abbey's chronicler, Jocelin of Brakelond, railed against all tenants who rose up against their lords, claiming that they "waxed fat" compared to their masters. The revolt of Darnhall and Over was thus one of many small-scale temporary villein uprisings before the Peasants' Revolt of June 1381.

== Origins and early years of the dispute ==
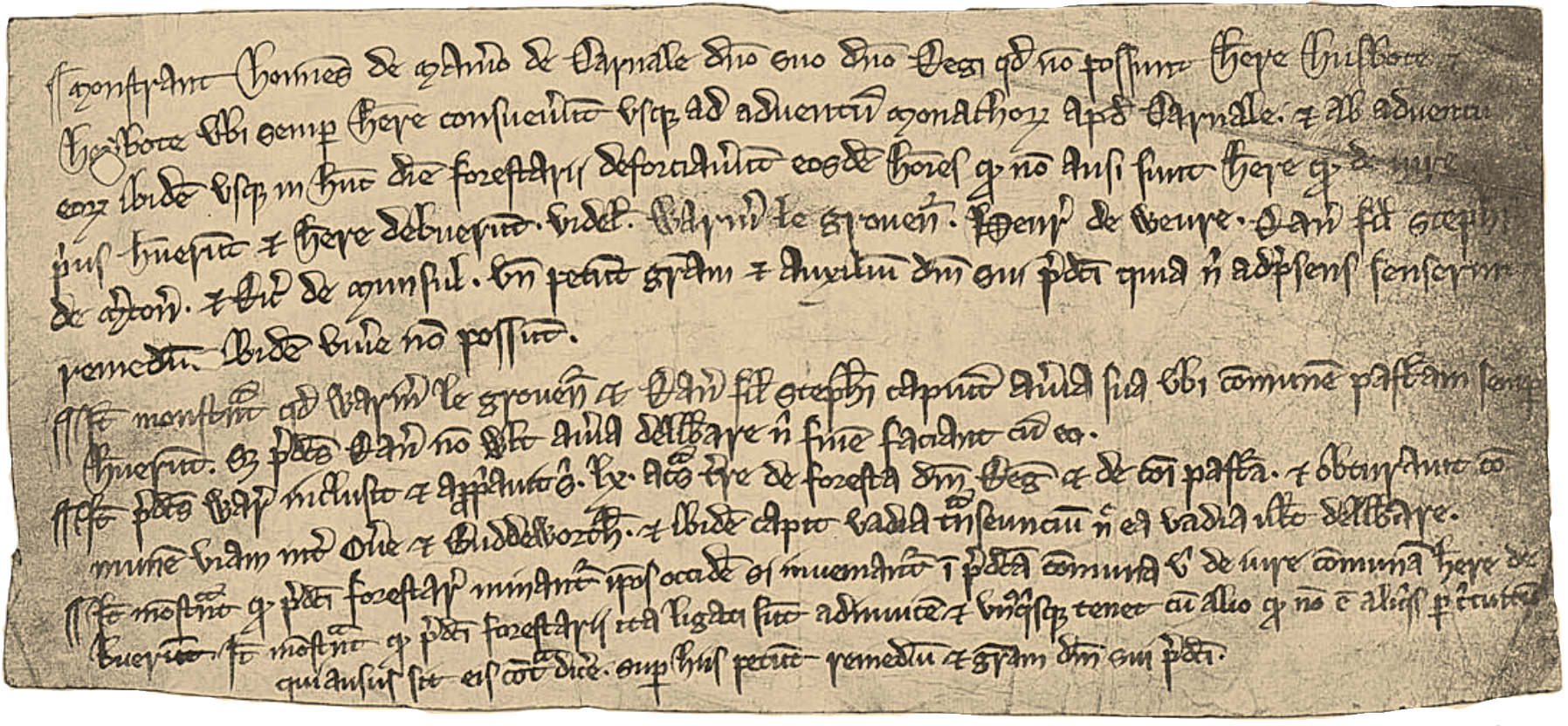
Petition from the "men of the manor of Darnhall"—homi[n]es de manio[rum] de Darnale—to King Edward I, (Note: Held at The National Archives, Kew, as SC 8/309/15406.) complaining that the Abbey's park officials prevent them from exercising their rights within the forest, including those of estover and common pasture for animals. They also complain that the Abbey has enclosed common land and blocked off a public road outside Over.

The new Abbey was unpopular locally, as locals claimed that both the grants of land its creation required and those for its day-to-day requirements impinged on villagers' customary liberties. Darnhall, previously a royal manor held by the earls of Chester, had been granted to the Abbey in perpetuity, along with its forestry rights and free warren. Villagers were also bound for duties such as leyrwithe—payment, or "redemption", to a lord on the marriage of a daughter—and services ranging from feeding the abbot's puppies and keeping his bees to paying massive death duties. (Note: The customs and duties that the abbey deemed Darnhall and Over to owe were codified in The Ledger Book and transcribed and printed by G. G. Coulton in 1925.) For its part, Over lost its annual fair and weekly market to the Abbey in 1280.

Consequently, relations between the Abbey and its tenantry had been fraught since the monks' arrival. Only a year after the Abbey's foundation, tenants of Darnhall tried to refuse the Abbot the customs and services he demanded, and they maintained their position—with increasing vigour—for the next fifty years. Soon after the Abbey's founding, they complained directly to King Edward I, and brought with them their iron ploughshares to demonstrate their status as freemen. (Note: Ploughshares were not just the tools of their everyday trade: Stephen Barney has described them as an example of the "sophisticated symbolization of medieval agricultural equipment", they represented both the two qualities of productivity and penitence. More importantly from the tenants' point of view, they demonstrated their status as freemen.) The King refused to countenance their arguments, telling them that "as villeins you have come, and as villeins you shall return". (Note: In the early medieval period, villeins were serfs who were tied to the land they worked, and as bonded tenants, they could not leave or stop working that land without the agreement of the lord of the manor. By the late fourteenth century, the role had ceased being as burdensome as it would have been a couple of hundred years earlier, with no heavy labouring service enforced. But it was still possible (and Vale Royal Abbey was party to this) for a lord to insist on receiving a third of a tenant's goods on the latter's death. Also, not being freemen, villeins did not have recourse to trial by jury. Even so: "despite the light labour services associated with villein tenure, there is no doubt that the personal and financial liabilities could weigh heavily.") They petitioned again in 1307, but with no more success; a commission held by the Justiciar of Chester merely re-confirmed their status. Argument appears to have escalated into violence in 1320, during the abbacy of Richard of Evesham. One of his monks was attacked while collecting tithes in Darnhall, while an Abbey servant, John of Budworth, was killed and his head used as a football by his attackers.

Although the villeins of Vale Royal's estate owed no labour service for their land, the villagers of Darnhall and those who joined them remained unhappy with their situation. Paul Booth writes: "they were the victims of the transfer of ownership of their manorial estates from the crown to a desperately under-endowed religious corporation". Villagers from nearby Middlewich also complained that the Abbey owed them restitution for the loss of two salt pits which had been part of the Abbey's endowment.

== The dispute ==
=== 1327–1336 ===
The abbot was on his return to his monastery, and a great crowd of the country people of Dernehale came to meet him in the highway on the feast of the Nativity of St. John the Baptist, about the ninth hour, at Exton in the county of Rutland; and they attacked him, and slew his groom, William Fynche, with an arrow in a place called Grene Delues. And there was also with them William de Venables of Bradewell, who at that time was suing the aforesaid abbot on account of Thomas de Venables, his brother, which Thomas claimed that he was of right entitled to fish in the stew of Dernehale; and when he saw that the aforesaid William Fynche was slain by his aid and help, he took to flight, and did not dare to stay his foot till he came to the parts of Chestershire, and he contemptibly abandoned those he had brought with him, and never looked behind him. Now Walter Welsh, the cellarer, and John Coton, and others of the abbot's servants were about half a league behind the abbot, having tarried for certain business; and when they saw the fight from afar they came up at full speed, and the said armed bondmen came up against them to assault them; but the aforesaid cellarer (blessed be his memory), like a champion sent from God to protect his house and father, though he was all unarmed, not without enormous bloodshed felled those sacrilegious men to the earth, and left all those whom he found in that place half dead, according to the law of the Lord (in lege d'ni). But certain of them fled, and the said John Coton followed after them and took them. Meanwhile the sound of people running up on all sides was heard, and after all the abbot was ignominiously taken, with all his people, by those bestial men of Rutland, and was brought to the city of Stamford, where the King then was, together with his bondmen; but on the morrow, through the aid of the Mother of Mercy, in whose cause he was acting, the abbot, with all his followers, obtained his rights, and the bondmen were left behind there in chains and in the greatest misery, while the abbot returned in safety to his monastery.

— The Ledger Book of Vale Royal Abbey

In 1327 the Abbot drew up a custumal (Note: A custumal was an early-medieval form of survey but one which, rather than listing the contents of an estate, assessed the customs of one. It thus gave the lord of the manor access to all local customs, often based on "oral testimony and the precedents recorded in other manorial documents (especially court rolls)".) for the villages of Darnhall and Over, clearly with the intention of reinforcing and codifying the Abbey's claims. This custumal, suggests historian Richard Hilton, "reveals a harshness of exploitation unparalleled even on the old-established Benedictine houses of the south", and he suggests that by now the villagers "appear to have been fighting against a real social degradation". The monks may have been forced to take harsh measures as landlords—if the Abbey was as poor as it claimed—to ensure a steady income. Ultimately it is impossible to establish whether the Abbey was as tyrannous as the villagers claimed. It is possible that the earls of Chester had been lax in their enforcement of the villagers' serfdom, and that they had therefore become accustomed to a high degree of freedom. It is also possible that it was the monks who had grown lax in their enforcement, and that the villagers of Darnhall and surrounding areas saw an opportunity to take advantage of them. There were at least four occasions of emancipatory manumission (without payment, unusually) in the Vale Royal records between 1329 and 1340, (Note: This was a relatively rare occurrence, mainly due to the sheer cost to the serf of remitting himself to the feudal lord for their freedom (£10-£15 by the fifteenth century).) and one scholar, Herbert Hewitt, has noted "an element of irony in the fact that the one corporate body which is known to have liberated any native is also the most distinguished for its rigid insistence on its legal rights over bondmen". It would certainly appear the case that the monks approached their landlord duties with zeal, but also that when manumission did occur, it was insufficient to quell the villagers' ire.

Either way, the two villages must have conspired together—and pooled mutual resources, for their campaign would not have been cheap. Both travel and litigation cost money, from the writing of the petition by clerks to their advisement on it by lawyers, let alone the cost of a delegation's upkeep. There was no such thing, says Edward Powell, "as cheap litigation", (Note: As K. B. McFarlane said of the period, "Like gambling, litigation was a rich man's pursuit.") although there was plenty of it; Richard Firth Green has commented that "what strikes one... is not the lawlessness of the Abbey's tenants but their touching faith in the legal process".

By 1328 the tenants' methods of resistance included refusing to grind flour at the abbey's mill, (Note: The villagers were not working in the abbey mills for the abbey, but for themselves. In a feudal custom called millsuit, the unfree tenant of a manor were bound to grind their own corn in the lord's mill, in this case the Abbot's. The lord charged a fee for the rent of his mill, usually claimed as a percentage of the tenant's productivity. Bailey notes that mill-suite, while common across the country, was enforced particularly rigorously in the north. Langdon also notes that in the first half of the fourteenth century, the profit margins of demesne milling could be very tight and particularly dependent on willingness to perform the duty.) continuing efforts to prevent restrictions from the Abbot on the leasing of their land, and demanding the concomitant right to lease it out themselves, for up to ten years. This incurred multiple punishments—meted out by the Abbot—in the form of fines and imprisonment, which resulted in their eventual submission. The Ledger Book of Vale Royal Abbey records how the following year—as the monks saw it—the rebellious tenantry "plotted maliciously" against the Abbey's "liberty", (Note: "Be it remembered that in the year 1329, and in the third year of the reign of King Edward [the Third] after the Conquest, the bondmen of the manor of Dernehale plotted maliciously against their lords, the Abbot Peter and the convent of Vale Royal, and they all assembled together at night in a place called Cunbbestyl, and declared against (confringentes) the liberty of the aforesaid house, [saying] that they would not grind at the lord's mill of Dernehale, and that it was not lawful for the abbot to punish them for any offence, except by the assessment of their neighbours." – 'Pleas and evidences: Fos. 7-20', in the Ledger Book.) refusing to accept the abbot's right to punish them "for any offence, except by the assessment of their neighbours"; in other words, they demanded the right to trial by jury. This was denied, they took up arms, but were once again imprisoned.

The next outbreak of violence took place in 1336. The Darnhall villagers approached the Cheshire Justiciar, claiming to have been granted their freedom by an "aforetime" royal charter. Although the legal response is now unknown, it was presumably unsuccessful as, on their return to the village, they were again thrown in gaol by the Abbot until they swore an oath to cease their complaints. Firth-Green suggests that this oath was extracted under duress, for on their release they sent a delegation to King Edward III, who was at this time "in the north parts". (Note: Edward III spent much of 1336 in the north, as part of an ongoing invasion Scotland, whether overseeing operations from York, leading a chevauchée into Scotland, or attending parliament at Nottingham.) It is unknown whether the party ever reached him; all that is known is that the group ended up in a Nottingham prison, where they were almost hanged as thieves. This was only avoided by payment of a fine. Another petition to the King, at the Westminster parliament, followed. This time another justiciar was despatched to Cheshire to assess their claims. Before he pronounced on them, however, he was intercepted by the Abbot with Vale Royal's charters. These the justiciar read, and seems to have been immediately persuaded by; as a result, several villagers were again returned to the Abbot for punishment.

=== Attack on Abbot Peter ===
In 1336, Abbot Peter denied the villages of Over rights of admission of burgage in the newly chartered borough; this prompted the Over villagers to join again with their Darnhall neighbours against the Abbey, and conflict resurged. They again went to law. As Hilton puts it: "They beset the Justiciar of Cheshire, the King himself, and even Queen Philippa in their search for redress". Indeed, she may have supported them. According to the Abbey record, the peasants still plotted by night against the Abbot. The extent to which he was held personally responsible is indicated by the distances that the villagers were willing to travel to confront him, suggests Hewitt. They went to extreme lengths: on one occasion they travelled as far as Exton, Rutland—a distance of approximately 100 miles—to hunt the Abbot down and ambush him.

This occurred in June 1336. Peter had visited the King at the latter's royal hunting lodge at King's Cliffe in an attempt at persuading the King to provide royal assistance against the Abbey's rebellious tenants. On his return journey, passing the village of Exton, Peter and his entourage were set upon by what the Ledger Book called a "great crowd of the country people" from Darnhall. He was well defended by his staff. The same author tells of how the Abbot's cellarer—a monk named Walter le Walche, or Walter Welch—rushed, mounted, from the rear of the party "like a champion sent from God" to defend his master. At this point, the Cheshiremen appear to have been joined by a gang of locals, and as a result, the abbatial party was overwhelmed. The Abbot was "ignominiously taken", and in the course of the struggle his groom was killed. However, the following day, the King, hearing of events, ordered Peter's release, and the arrest of his captors, who were taken to Stamford and imprisoned in chains in "the greatest of misery". (Note: The Ledger and its author are naturally writing from the perspective of the Abbot; unsurprisingly, "the villagers of Darnhall have not left us their side of the story".) Notwithstanding that a man had been killed in the melee, the King soon ordered their release also. Shortly after, the King wrote to Abbot Peter requesting that he return to his tenants the property he had confiscated, which Peter ignored. The Abbot did, however, reduce the £10 fine he had imposed on them to £4.

By 1337, the Abbey had asserted and reasserted its rights over its recalcitrant tenantry in court, always receiving favourable judgements, but the villagers of Darnhall and Over refused to accept their position, refused payment of their customary dues, and this year reignited the feud anew. Again, complained The Ledger, the tenants "conspired against their lords [and] endeavoured to gain their liberty". Recording how the people firstly complained to the Chester justiciar, then petitioned parliament, and finally sent a deputation to present their case to the King at Windsor, the writer concluded they were behaving "like mad dogs". Furthermore, when Abbot Peter attempted to collect the monies owed him by confiscating the villagers' goods, they merely decamped with them before he could do so.

The Abbot had sufficient political connections and influence in central government to frustrate the villagers' lawsuits. The early encouragement that Hilton says they had received from various "royal and official personages", such as the Queen, would appear to have had little effect. The Abbot's legal victory did not assuage a serious undermining of his authority. As with any lord in the Middle Ages, when his authority was questioned by those of lower social strata, the law would almost inherently find for him; but, notes Hewitt, it would also "be idle to identify legality with justice". It is certainly unlikely that the Abbey attained its near-permanent favourable legal position without a fair amount of legal manipulation and chicanery, as well as great expense. The villages resorted to further violence, and in 1339—probably during a raid on the Abbey's crops or outhouses—both Abbot Peter and his cellarer were killed. (Note: Violent expressions of anti-clericalism such as this were not uncommon, and although Peter's is an extreme example, it was not even the only time an ecclesiast was killed. In 1309 a gang assaulted the Abbot of Cobermere, burnt his house down and stole his goods, in which attack another monk was slain. In 1360 a gang armed with "swords, axes and arrows" assaulted the Abbot of Shap. In the 1430s, the Abbot of Folkestone was forcibly removed from his church by local people—in the middle of saying mass—and was taken to a nearby cliff where his assailants threatened to throw him into the sea. And in the 1450s, Abbot Walter Mene of Abbey was repeatedly threatened with assault by a patron of his abbey, Sir Henry Hussey.) Although details of the exact circumstances of their deaths are unknown, they may have been the result of a feud with the local gentry rather than the villages. Peter was engaged in a spirited defence of his house's rights and prerogatives against Sir Thomas de Venables, who is known to have launched similar raids. (Note: Firth-Green suggests that this final raid may have been in the nature of a joint operation, arguing that "we should not be too quick to assume that the gentry and peasantry would automatically have found themselves on opposite sides of the fence".) Before the Abbot's and Welch's deaths, a number of the Abbey's buildings were destroyed, much of the harvest burnt, goods stolen and livestock killed.

== Legacy ==
Despite its assertions of right, the Abbey was never able to fully dominate its own estate or to establish itself as the regional lord from which all tenurial dues sprang. Abbots of Vale Royal continued to face disruption from the populace almost up until the time of the Abbey's dissolution by King Henry VIII in 1536. In 1351, for example, they lamented that they were "so wrongfully annoyed and harassed in many other ways". In the late fourteenth century, Edward the Black Prince wrote to the justice of Chester that he believed the abbots to be "wrongfully annoyed and harassed in many ... ways by the people of these parts ... the Justice is therefore to restrain any persons who from malice are going about to molest or annoy them". And as late as 1442, the Abbot protested that when he attempted to travel to Llanbadarn Fawr, Ceredigion, he was continually at risk of attack from the villagers of the surrounding countryside, who were, he protested, "in a blaze of riot".

The immediate outcome of the dispute is unknown. Peter's successor, Robert de Cheyneston, was occupied through much of his abbacy with internal disciplinary problems at the abbey and a bitter feud with Shrewsbury Abbey which had begun in Peter's time. The dispute continued with "many allegations of each party", and was not settled until 1343, when de Cheyneston paid the Abbot of Shrewsbury £100. The Abbey's internal affairs were also problematic. The Ledger Book records that in 1340 two monks were charged with murdering two local men, Robert Hykes and John Bulderdog, and that de Cheyneston himself was arraigned and fined for appropriating burgages belonging to Over.

More broadly, serfdom and villeiny were dying out of their own accord. The reasons for this are unknown and much debated among historians. Mark Bailey says, "villein tenures were, in fact, in headlong retreat from the 1350s, and had largely decayed by the 1380s", with what remaining being seasonal work, such as harvest time. He argues that while peasant resistance—such as that which had been seen in Darnhall and Over—continued through the next decade, it was also in decline. This may indicate that it was seen as being less necessary by bondmen. Conversely, Alan Harding argues, albeit on a national level, that the number of commissions of oyer and terminer (Note: In English law, oyer and terminer (/ˈɔɪ.ər ... ˈtɜːrmɪnər/—a partial translation of the French oyer et terminer, or "to hear and to determine"—was the Law French name for one of the commissions by which a judge of assize sat. These were special appointments designed to investigate specific local issues or individuals, rather than regular courts.)—investigations headed by a assize judge—into the "rebellious" withdrawal of feudal labour by villeins indicates that such conspiracies continued up until the 1381 Rising.

== See also ==
- Darnhall Abbey
