= Darnhall =

Village in Cheshire, England

Coordinates: 53°09′51″N 02°32′53″W

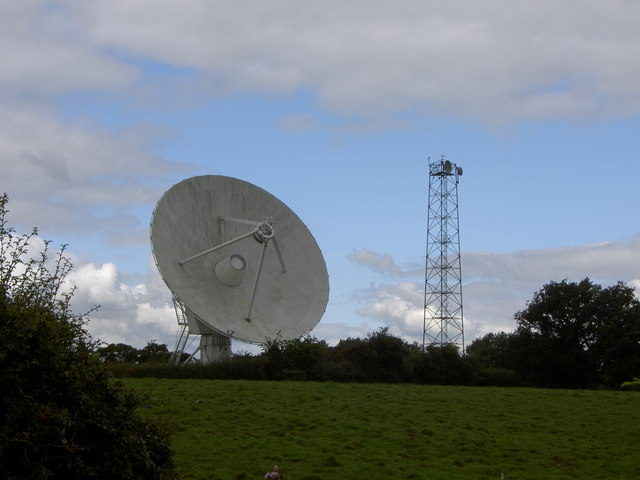
- The MERLIN radio telescope, Darnhall

- Location within Cheshire
- OS grid reference: SJ635631
- Civil parish: Darnhall
- Unitary authority: Cheshire West and Chester
- Ceremonial county: Cheshire
- Region: North West
- Country: England
- Sovereign state: United Kingdom
- Post town: WINSFORD
- Postcode district: CW7
- Dialling code: 01270
- Police: Cheshire
- Fire: Cheshire
- Ambulance: North West
- UK Parliament: Mid Cheshire

Darnhall is a civil parish and small village to the south west of Winsford in the Borough of Cheshire West and Chester and the ceremonial county of Cheshire in England. It had a population of 232 at the 2011 Census.

== History ==
The Norman Earls of Chester had a hunting lodge or summer palace at Darnhall in Over parish. There was an enclosed area where deer and wild boar were kept to be hunted by the Earl and his guests. It was there that the last earl met his death in 1237. It was rumoured that his wife, Helen, the daughter of Llywelyn the Great, had poisoned him in order to favour the powerful aristocrat that her daughter had married. However, King Henry III annexed the title and its lands and spent time at Darnhall. After the Second Barons' War, the Ash Brook was dammed to drive three water mills and to make pools to keep fish. In 1270 at the behest of his son, Henry III gave the estate to the Cistercians, who built Darnhall Abbey in 1274 on the north bank of the new lake. However the land was not suitable for the grand scale of building envisaged, and the locals were not cooperative, so the monks left Darnhall to found Vale Royal Abbey in Whitegate in 1281.

For a period of around 50 years, between the foundation of Vale Royal and the death of Abbot Peter, the tenants and villeins of Darnhall periodically rebelled against the abbey's overlordship, sometimes violently.

The first mention of a priest is in 1307 when a Thomas de Dutton is mentioned, but it is uncertain if this was at St Chad's in Winsford or as a chaplain at Darnhall, or both. The church and responsibility for the parish was given to St Mary's Convent in Chester, who appointed the priests in charge.

By the eighteenth century, Darnhall belonged to Thomas Corbett (secretary of the Admiralty), and through him it descended to Thomas Corbett (Lincolnshire MP).

== Geography ==
A small area near the eastern boundary of the civil parish falls within the Weaver Valley Area of Special County Value. The parish includes Darnhall Wood, part of the Wettenhall And Darnhall Woods Site of Special Scientific Interest, together with woodland in the adjacent Wettenhall parish.

== Landmarks ==
Darnhall is home to one of the radio telescopes that make up the Jodrell Bank MERLIN (Multi-Element Radio Linked Interferometer Network) radio telescope array linking six observing stations that together form a powerful telescope with an effective aperture of over 135 mi (217 km).

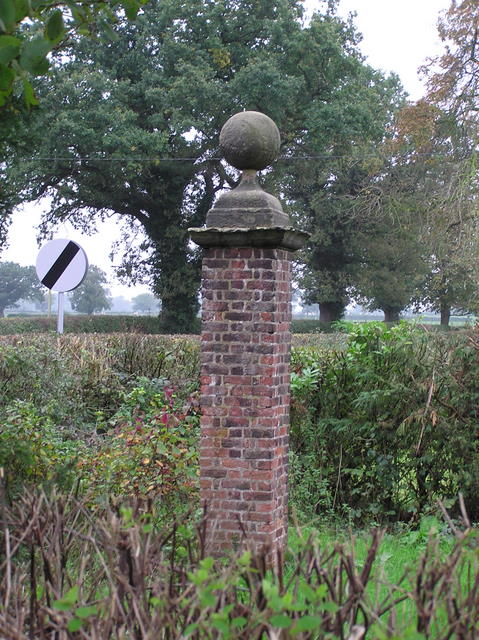
One of the Darnhall Knobs as viewed from Moors Lane

At the junction between Moors Lane and Hall Lane stands two stone pillars known as the "Darnhall Knobs", one of which was constructed in 1897 to mark the celebration of the Diamond Jubilee of Queen Victoria after the previous column fell 70 years prior. The other pillar stands parallel and is said to have ancient origins.

== Notable people ==
- Charles Lee – A British army officer who later became a general in the American Continental Army.

== See also ==
- Weaver Hall, Darnhall
