= Sporting lodge =

Building that provides lodging for hunters

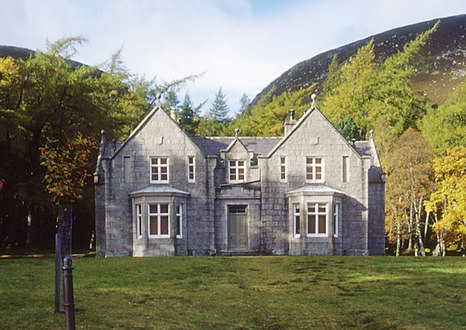
Glas-allt-Shiel, Glen Muick - one of the sporting lodges owned by King Charles III on the Balmoral Estate

In Great Britain and Ireland a sporting lodge – also known as a hunting lodge, hunting box, fishing hut, shooting box, or shooting lodge – is a building designed to provide lodging for those practising the sports of hunting, shooting, fishing, stalking, falconry, coursing and other similar rural sporting pursuits.

Sporting lodges can be an ancillary building on part of an established country estate in closer proximity to where the sport takes place, however they are oftentimes also the principal residence at the centre of a separate dedicated Sporting Estate

== History ==
=== Origins in England ===
Sporting lodges date back to the Norman era of British history where after the Norman Conquest the king divided up land for himself and favoured nobles on which to hunt. This could be a royal forest or a chase. The word Lodge is derived from a Frankish or Norman word for 'shelter', and the earliest examples would have been built in these hunting lands to serve as accommodation – or 'lodging' – for the king and his guests. The lodges would also often serve as accommodation for the king's staff whose job was to protect the land and game or quarry from poachers, and later to enforce law and order within the forest.

==== Warreners lodges ====
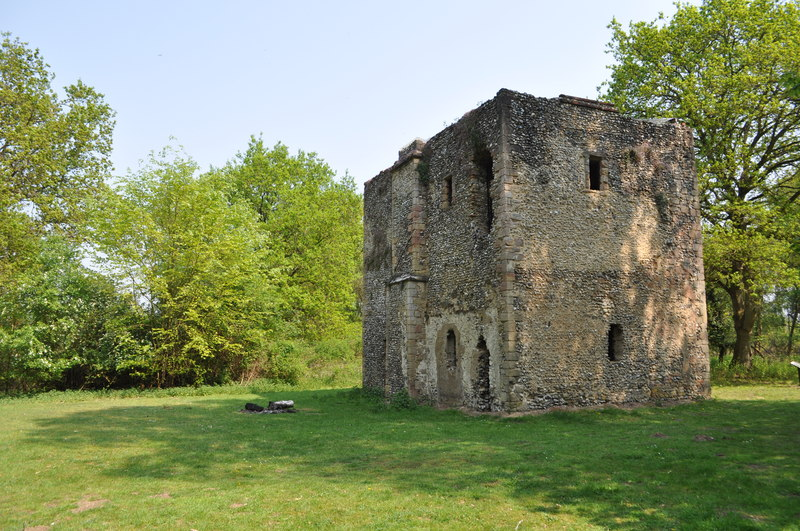
A ruined Warren Lodge at Thetford

Some of the earliest examples of sporting lodges are 'warreners lodges'. The Normans were fond of hunting rabbits, which were not native to the British isles, and so they introduced them. However the rabbits were ill-adapted to the English climate and easy prey for native predators, so purpose built artificial 'warrens' were established and fenced in, usually on poor, sandy or heath land on the grounds of medieval manors. As the rabbits commanded a high value, lodges were built for 'warreners' – people employed to guard and care for the rabbits. Like dovecotes, these artificial warrens fell out of use as rabbit became less desirable as a food source, while rabbit populations became more ubiquitous and established in the wild.

==== Early hunting lodges ====
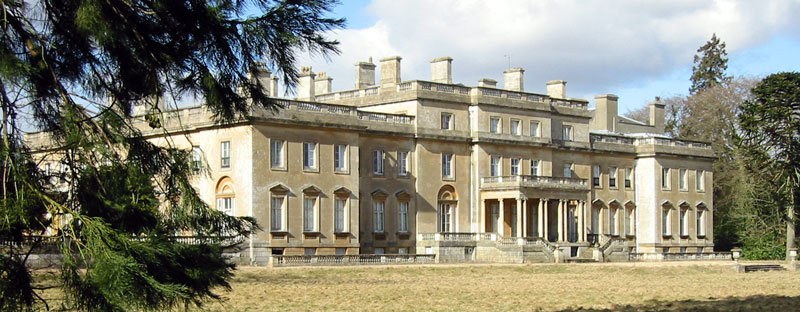
Tottenham House, which started as Tottenham Lodge, the Lodge of the Warden of Savernake Forest. The original Lodge was replaced with the current country house to reflect the elevated status of the occupants.

During the late medieval period, hunting became more socially important and so too did the role of the lodge. Introduced by William I, "forest law", was historically distinct from the law of the rest of the country and operated outside the common law, serving to protect game animals and their forest habitat from destruction. Under the Anglo-Saxon kings, officers had been appointed across the country to oversee areas of food and forestry, especially where there may be geographic or natural dangers (for example, the "Wardwicks of the Moors"), and the Norman kings continued this practice, appointing Stewards (also called 'wardens', 'keepers', 'master foresters', 'woodreeves', or 'guardians') of their forests. Lodges would be provided for these officials, for example Rushmore Lodge which was provided as the residence of the Keeper of Cranborne Chase.

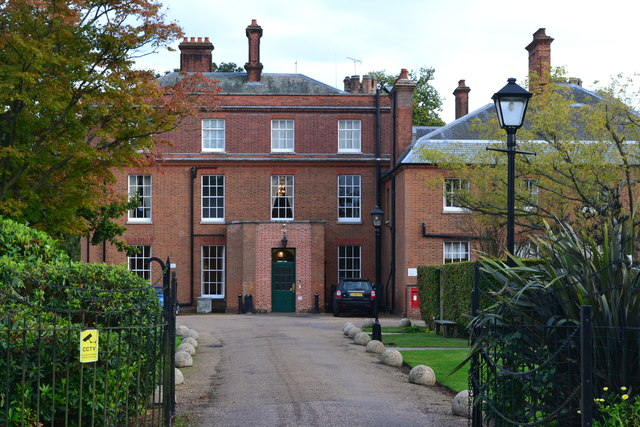
Cumberland Lodge, former official residence of the Ranger of Windsor Great Park

The stewards would be expected to ensure the lodges were ready for use by the monarch, should they wish to make use of the hunting in the forest or chase. These wardens would host and attend courts known as eyres, where they would receive rents, fines and equipage (e.g. saddle, bridle, sword and horn), while offences were adjudicated on by justice in eyre. The forest law was enforced locally by various types of medieval 'forester' (officers usually in the employ of the warden) including "woodwards" and their deputies, such as "bowbearers" and "rangers", who enforced the law within the Purlieu of the forest, while "agisters" managed the free-roaming animals, and "verderers" investigated and recorded minor offences such as the taking of venison and the illegal cutting of woodland, and dealt with the day-to-day forest administration, while "regarders" undertook periodic inspection of the forest. Foresters' lodges could provide accommodation for these officers. The five animals of the forest protected by forest law (outlined by John Manwood a justice eyre of the New Forest) were the hart and hind (red deer), boar, hare and wolf. Protection was also said to be extended to the beasts of chase, the buck and doe (fallow deer), fox, marten, and roe deer, and the beasts and fowls of warren: the hare, coney, pheasant, and partridge. White Park cattle, such as the Wild Cattle of Chillingham were also hunted. As the courts would meet at the lodges, depending on the workload of the court, they were often converted into full time offices and court houses for the officials required to oversee and uphold forest law. Speech House in the Forest of Dean began life as a hunting lodge for Charles II but was later re-commissioned to host the "Court of the Speech", a sort of parliament for the verderers and free miners managing the forest, game, and mineral resources of the area.

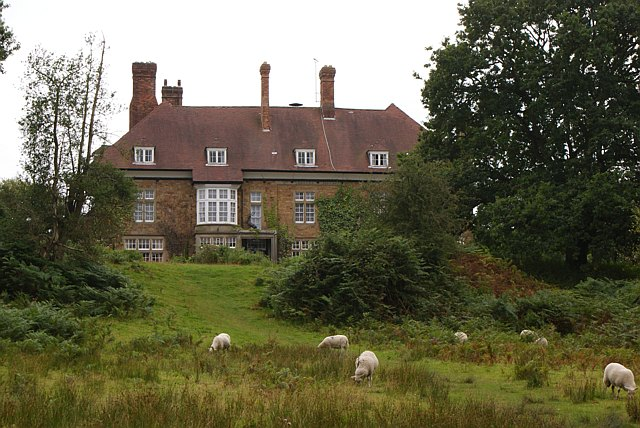
The Speech House – Forest of Dean

Royal hunting lodges from the late medieval era can be found across England, for example in the grounds of Kings Langley Palace (dating to Henry III), to John O'Gaunt's Castle (dated to the era of Edward III). Initially hunting and sporting rights were closely guarded by the King, however in due course they also allowed members of the nobility and senior clergy to 'empark' deer parks (to enclose the land with a wall or hedgebank and to establish a captive herd of deer within, with exclusive hunting rights). At their peak at the turn of the 14th century, deer parks may have covered 2% of the land area of England.

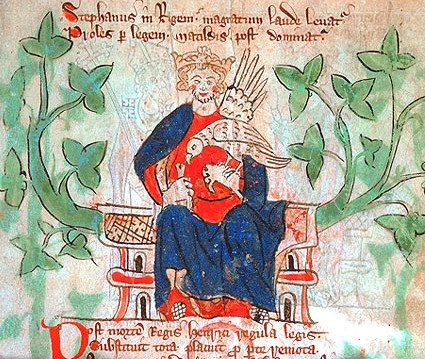
Stephen, King of England with a falcon in a 14th century manuscript

Falconry was also an important form of hunting enjoyed by royals in both England and Scotland in the medieval era. A royal mews (a birdhouse designed to house one or more birds of prey) was established in Charing Cross in London in the reign of Edward I, and officers were appointed to organise hawking, such as the Hereditary Grand Falconer of England and the Hereditary Royal Falconer of Scotland. The mews at Charing Cross provided lodging for the king's falconers. By the 1530s the mews had been converted into a stable for the king's horses with lodging for carriage drivers and groomsmen, which is why the royal stables are now known as the Royal Mews. The head of the Royal Mews is the Master of the Horse with all matters connected with horses, stables and coachhouses, the stud, and formerly also the hunting hounds (and kennels) of the sovereign, as well as the mews, within their jurisdiction. Officials responsible for the kings hunting dogs - such as the Master of the Buckhounds and Master of the Staghounds - sat within his department.

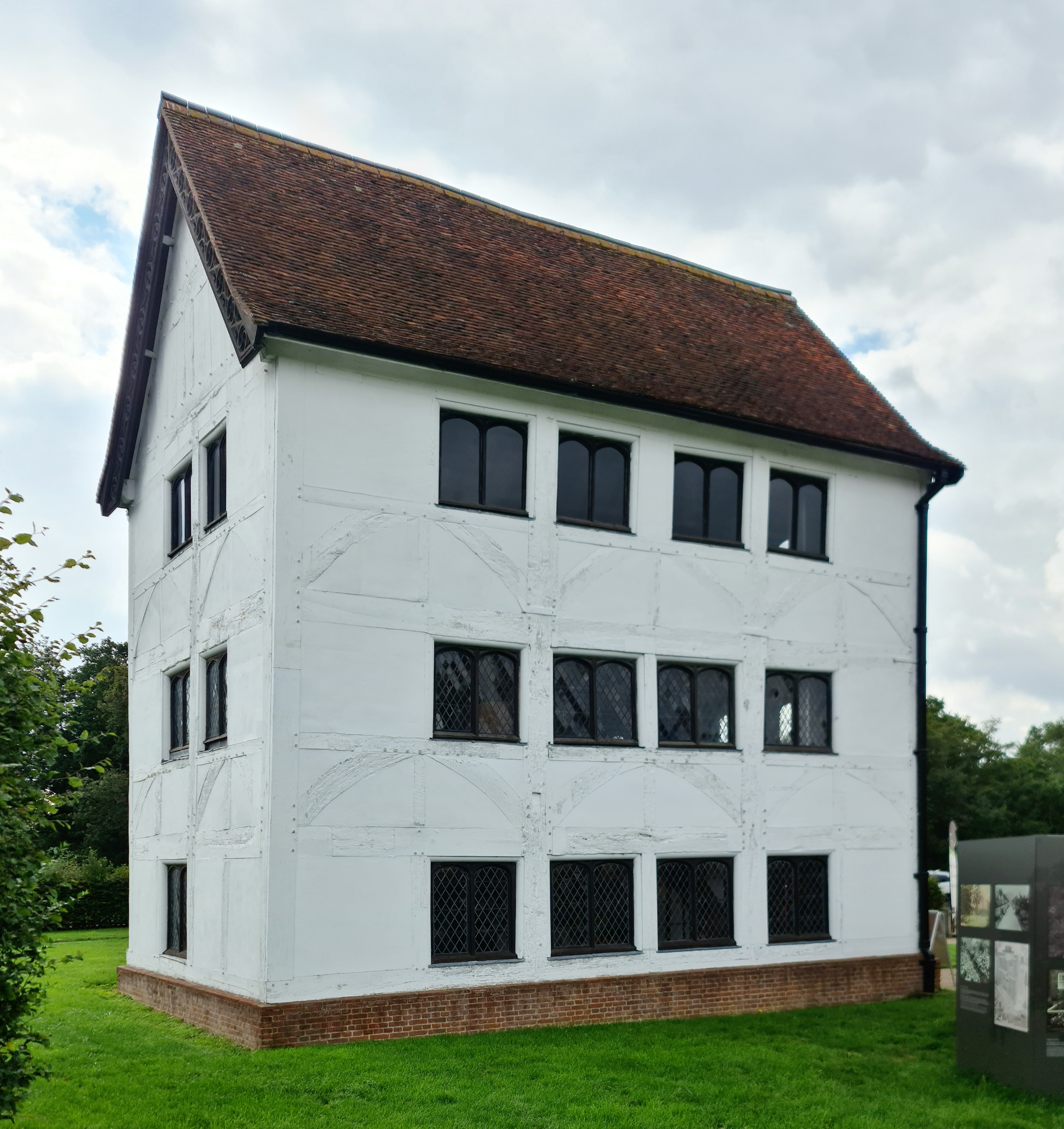
Queen Elizabeth's Hunting Lodge

Hunting remained an important royal pastime into the Tudor era, and having access to it, as well as a lodge in which to host and entertain, could elevate ones social status. King Henry VIII for example, stayed at Savernake forest in 1535, where it is believed that his eye was then taken by his host's daughter, Jane Seymour. The host was the King's Warden of the Forest of Savernake Sir John Seymour. After the execution of Anne Boleyn in May 1536, they were subsequently married, and Jane was crowned Queen just months later, causing the head of the family at Savernake to suddenly find himself father-in-law to Henry VIII. Savernake remains to this day (2023) the only royal forest still in private hands with David Brudenell-Bruce, Earl of Cardigan serving as the current and thirty-first warden of Savernake Forest. Hunting became popular to watch as well as participate in. Nobles would build grandstands called 'standings' overlooking a chase, where deer or other quarry would be herded or released and then coursed.

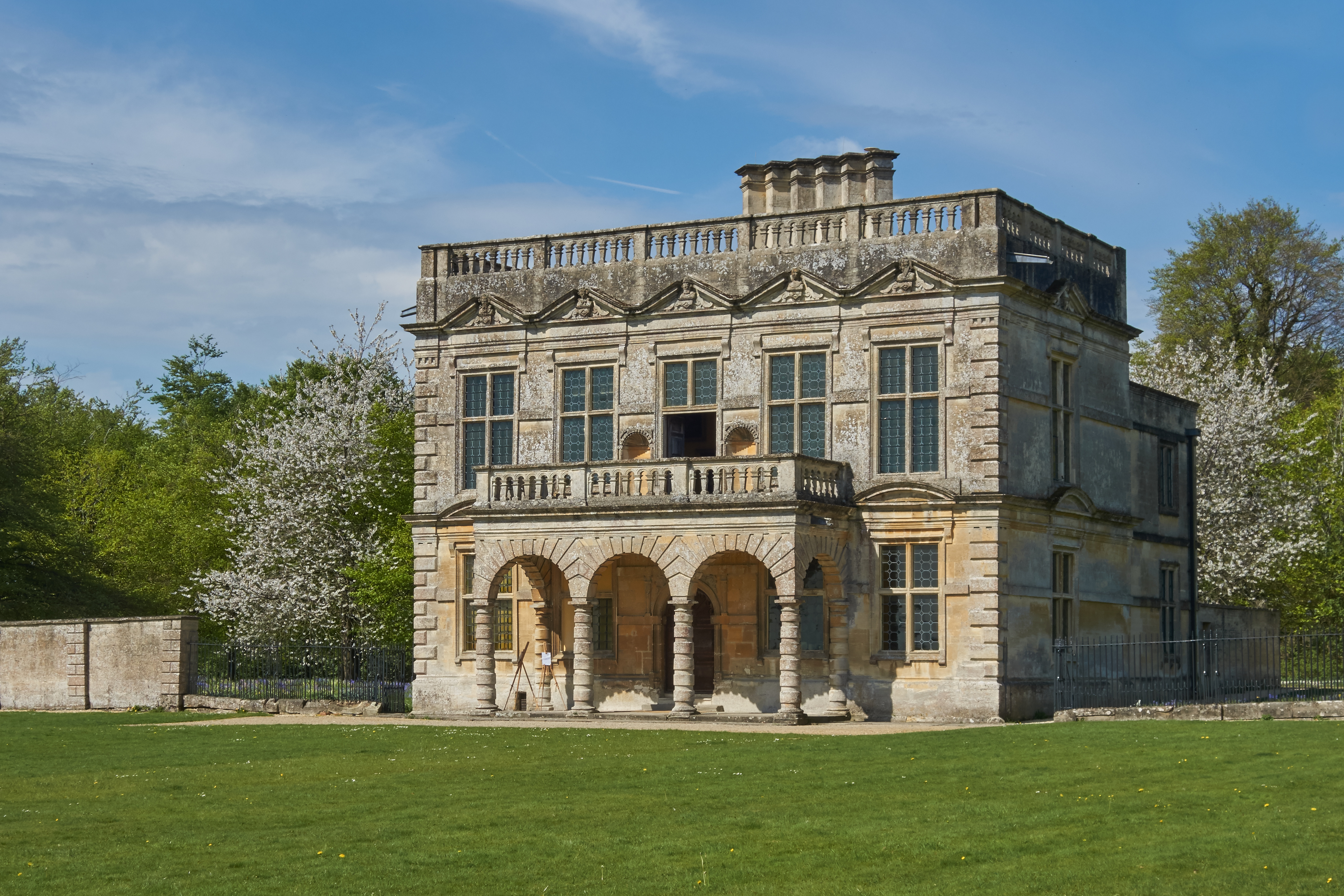
Lodge Park an example of a 17th century "standing" for observing deer coursing

In Epping Forest in 1543, Henry commissioned a building, known as the Great Standing, from which to view the chase at Chingford. The building was renovated in 1589 for Queen Elizabeth I and can still be seen today in Chingford. The building is now known as Queen Elizabeth's Hunting Lodge, and is open to the public. Lodge Park on the Sherborne estate is England's only surviving 17th-century deer course and grandstand, having been built by the Dutton family in the 1630s.

Deer hunting continued to be a popular pleasure sport among the royals throughout the Jacobean period. King James I had an extensive deer park added to Theobalds Palace in 1607, which became his favourite hunting lodge until his death at the palace.

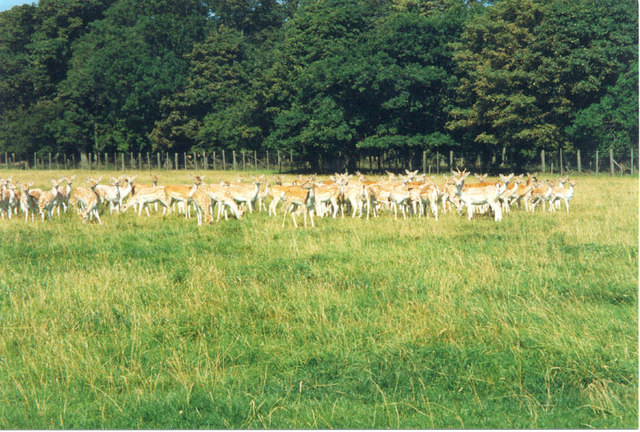
Deer in the old deer park at Dyrham Park

After the English Civil War, deer parks began to decline. This was due to a myriad of economic and social trends. Agricultural rents came to be more profitable as a form of passive income for those who needed the money to maintain their standing and land would be increasingly turned over to these purposes. Hunting for the table became less important and hunting for agricultural pest control (such as fox hunting and beagling) became more important and did not require a conventional lodge (instead utilising stables and kennels). Additionally with the proliferation of pleasure grounds and landscape gardens as a status symbol, the medieval parks were incorporated into the landscaped grounds of the post-medieval country houses that replaced the manor houses and grander Sporting lodges that had previously stood at the heart of these parks until the transition from feudalism. Meanwhile James I and his ministers Robert Cecil and Lionel Cranfield pursued a policy of increasing revenues from the forests and starting the process of disafforestation – timber was needed to build ships, fuel forges and later for the industrial revolution. Falconry/Hawking and bow hunting became less popular, as firearm technology developed. Parks and their attendants came to be used for alternative purposes as other sports fell into royal favour, for example, Queen Anne had land developed at "East Cote" (Ascot) into a racecourse – the Greencoats (formerly known as Yeoman Prickers) who today attend at the Royal Ascot racecourse started life in Queen Anne's reign staging hunts, while the Master of Buckhounds also became Her Majesty's Representative at Ascot. Some royal parks became public pleasure gardens as the areas around them became urbanised. These factors combined to see the decline of the traditional sporting lodges.

=== Early Scottish sporting lodges ===
The Tudor monarchs of England passed a series of increasingly strict hunting laws and restrictions on game seasons. As these laws were implemented prior to the union of England and Scotland they did not apply in Scotland and hunting remained marginally more accessible. Although the Scottish monarchs imposed their own hunting regulations, they were not as strict as the laws passed south of the border.

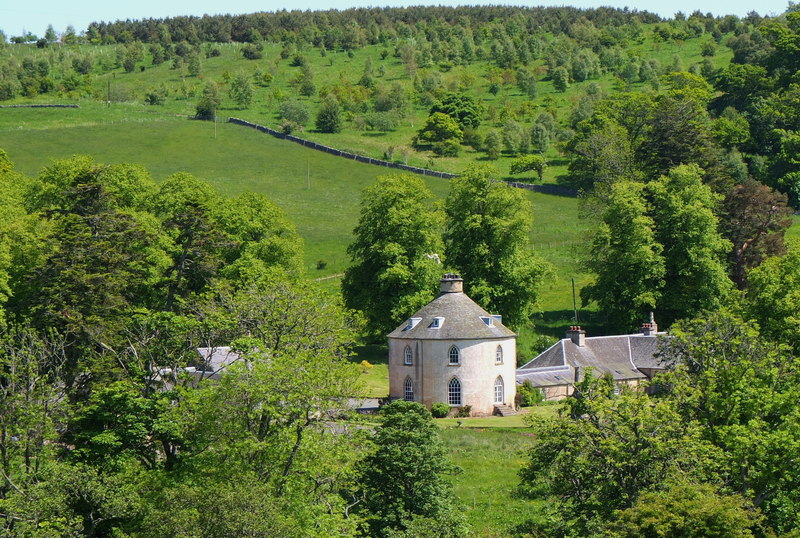
The Retreat, Abbey St Bathans - built in the 1780s by the Earl of Wemyss Francis Wemyss-Charteris as a hunting lodge at Abbey St Bathans in the Lammermuir Hills near Coldingham Bay

Hunting lodges in Scotland had originated as spartan "Quarters" from which Clan Chiefs would organise coursing and hunting parties (dog breeds like the Scottish Deerhound were bred for coursing stag). When feudalism eventually reached Scotland new rules and rights came to the feudal landowners, such as salmon fishing rights which became a sought after feudal title in their own right. From the 16th and 17th centuries, hunting became more popular among the general (non noble) population, and large-scale hunts were organized, often featuring hundreds of hunters and horses.

The Scottish chronicler Robert Lindsay of Pitscottie wrote that during the reign of James V, the Earl of Atholl arranged a hunt for the King, his mother Margaret Tudor, and a Papal Ambassador. The Earl had a purpose built hunting lodge constructed to look like a medieval palace, made from green timber, with the meadow for a floor, a moat, and even a portcullis made from trees felled nearby. The hunt lasted for three days, with over 600 deer bagged and dishes of capercaillie and swan served in the evenings. At the end of the three days the Earl and his men set fire to the "Greenwood Palace". The Papal Ambassador enquired as to this practice to which the King is said to have replied that it was the practice amongst highlanders that once a lodge had been used by the King it would be destroyed so it could afford accommodation to none of inferior station.

Sporting lodges continued to be built in Scotland through the 1700s. The Duke of Hamilton's hunting lodge was built at Chatelherault by William Adam in 1734 and provided kennels, stables and accommodation for hunting parties returning from the woodlands to the south.

=== The modern sporting lodge ===
==== 19th century renaissance ====
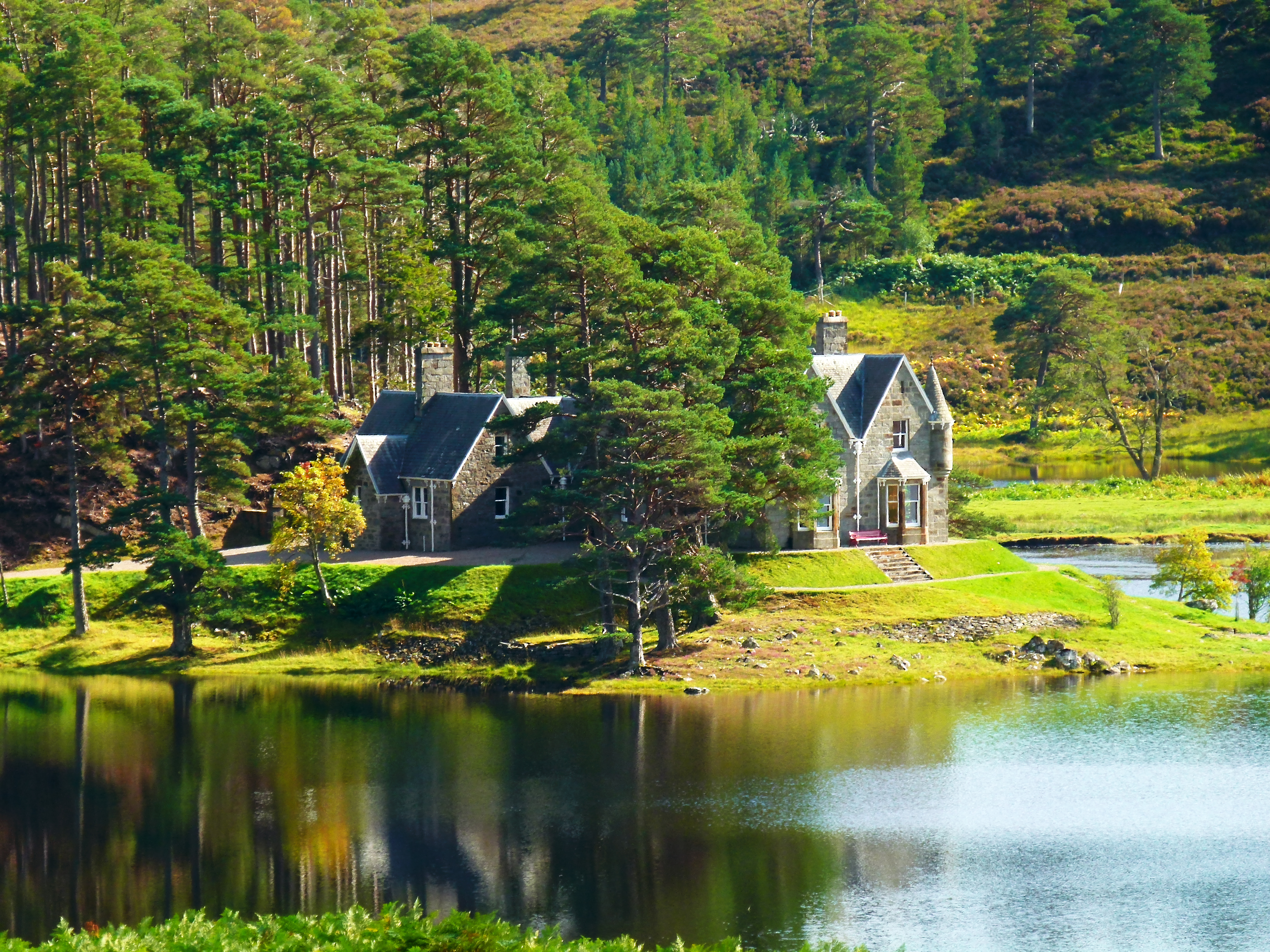
Glen Affric Lodge

Until the 19th Century, sporting lodges had mostly only been owned by members of the royal family and their favoured nobles (more so in England) who had been permitted to 'empark' their lands and held sporting rights from the sovereign. It wasn't until the early 19th century when the Game Act 1831 repealed the restrictions imposed upon game hunting by Henry VIII that other members of the nobility, gentry and even the Nouveau riche of the industrial revolution began building and buying their own sporting lodges.

Scottish Sporting Lodges also experienced a renaissance in the Victorian era, coinciding with the purchase by Prince Albert and Queen Victoria of the Balmoral estate for the purposes of hunting, along with the Romantic revival of Jacobitism. Numerous Scottish lodges were purchased or erected by families from England.

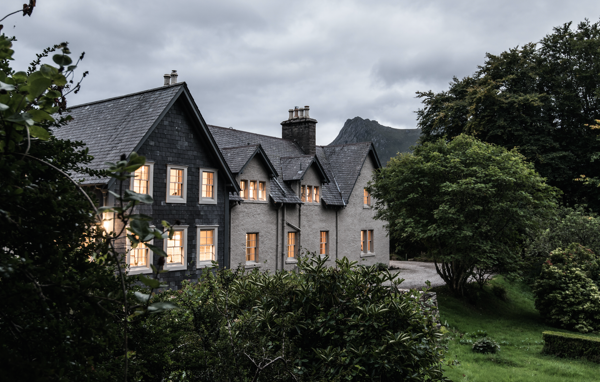
Kinloch Lodge

Each year after the social season in London, the upper classes would make their way back out to the countryside to their country estates. In the Victorian era it became common for those with sporting lodges and sporting estates in Scotland and the North of England to follow the lead of the royal family, first to Harrogate for the 'Harrogate Season' to 'take in the waters', and then on to their sporting lodges in time for the grouse hunting season commencing on the Glorious Twelfth (for the Royal Family this was Balmoral).

The first purpose-built sporting lodges of this era were constructed in order for a large land owner to hunt on a more remote part of their estate, subsidiary estate, grouse moor or other distant piece of land owned for sporting purposes. However for those who bought land from greater landowners with the intention of creating their own sporting estates, new sporting lodges were erected. In Scotland this was often done in the Scottish baronial style. Around this era Clan Chiefs and Scottish Lairds began to invest in more substantial and luxurious sporting lodges with a view to letting them out to rich clients. Some Chiefs let out their own castles as lodging.

==== Early 20th century decline ====
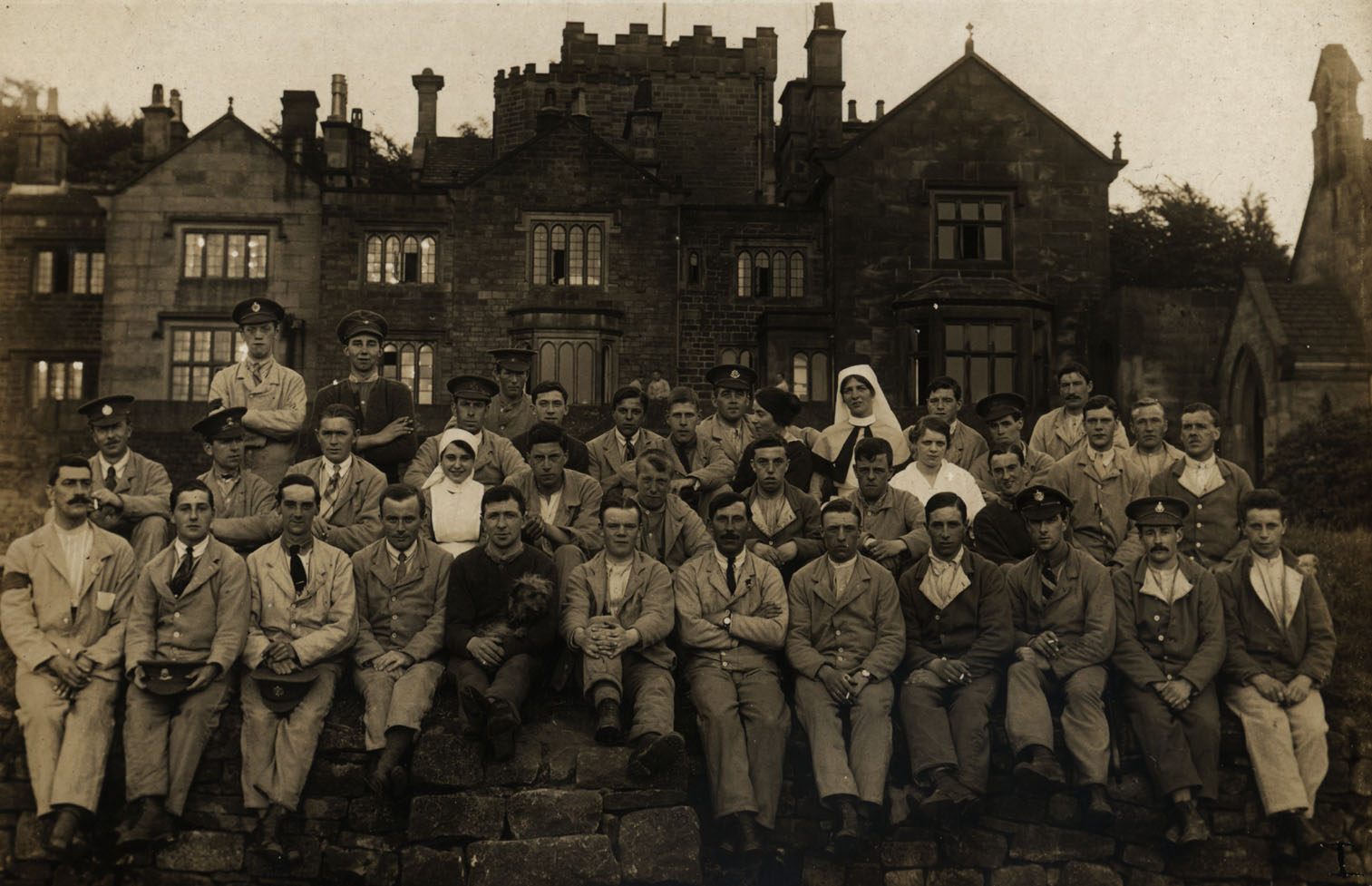
Group Portrait of Wounded Soldiers at Longshaw Lodge, which was converted into a convalescent home during World War I

World War I meant a lot of these 19th century sporting lodges had to be mothballed. This coincided with the loss of many of the great country houses across the British isles. The owners of these great Country Houses often owned, or supported sporting lodges with their patronage, and with their loss, so too came a loss to the sporting hobby and associated industry. The large retinue of staff required to maintain such a property left to fight and never returned, or they departed to work in the munitions factories, or filled the void left by the fighting men in other workplaces. Of those who returned after the war, many left the countryside for better-paid jobs in towns. Larger sporting lodges also required a large retinue of staff to be viable. Like the country houses, many of the larger sporting lodges were also requisitioned and converted into convalescent homes, or hospitals for the war wounded. This practice continued into the Second World War.

==== Present ====
Following the decline of large historic residential properties in the 20th century, in the present era many private country houses, manors and castles have had to find alternative revenue streams to support maintenance costs. Larger sporting lodges have not been exempt from this, and many private sporting estates have had to become commercial to remain viable. While in many instances the lodges themselves may remain as private residences with accommodation provided only to those paying to hunt on the estate, many have also been fully converted into hotels, or at least adjusted to provide ancillary uses, for example as wedding venues. The cost of maintaining multiple properties has also re-shaped the sporting lodge landscape. Strutt & Parker, an estate agent in the UK, estimates that just 50% of owners now use their sporting estate as an occasional retreat, while the other half use it as their primary residence.

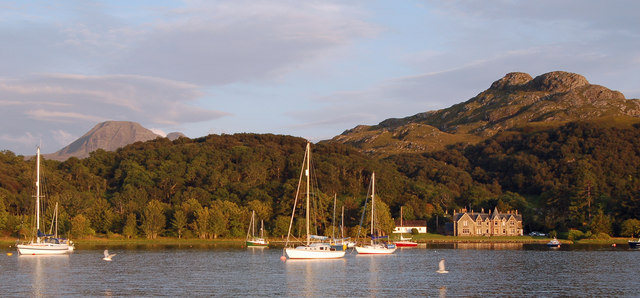
Shieldaig Lodge, built in the 19th Century, now operating as a hotel set within a 26000-acre estate, runs deer stalking from mid-August with its own stalkers, and fly fishing, with salmon and sea trout fishing on Loch Badachro and the River Badachro.

== Variants ==
While some sporting lodges are in locations and on sporting estates that cater to a wide range of sporting pursuits (such as shooting, fishing and stalking), other sporting lodges are designed to be niche, and are built in a style and location for one specific sport.

=== Hunting Box ===
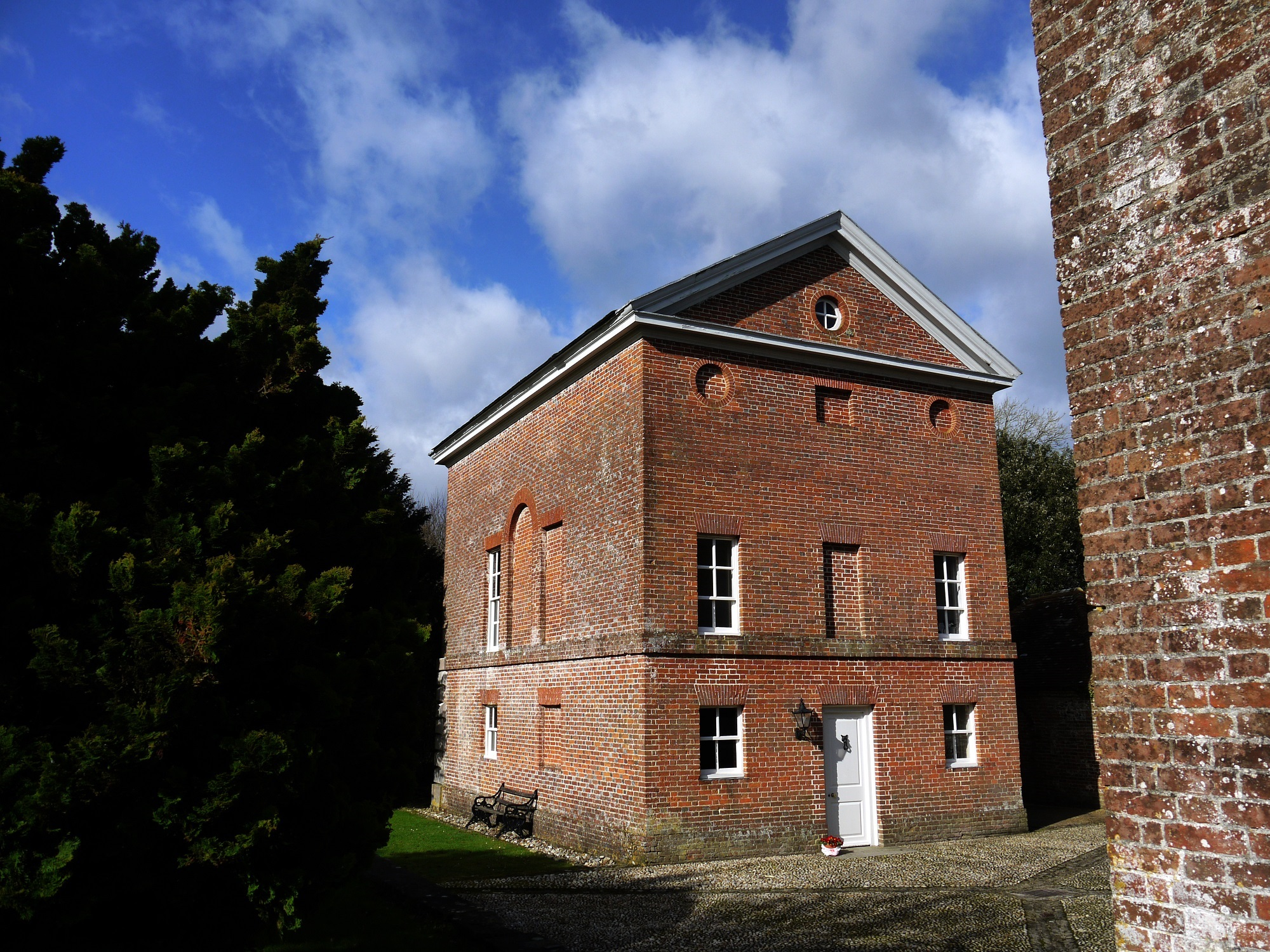
Fox Hall - the hunting box of the 2nd Duke of Richmond, built for the Charlton Hunt

A Hunting Box is usually a small house or cottage, predominantly in England, used for lodging during the fox hunting season. The purpose of these buildings are to provide a closer proximity to the hunt for the owner. They sometimes have their own dedicated stabling and even kennels. The proliferation of hunting boxes is often attributed to the 19th century improvement of the railways which allowed hunters to move across the country during the hunting season, and provided access to hunts known as 'the shire packs' (such as the Quorn Hunt, Cottesmore, Belvoir, Fernie and Pytchley). Melton Mowbray is thought to have a large number of Hunting Boxes because of its proximity to four of the shire hunts.

=== Fishing Huts ===
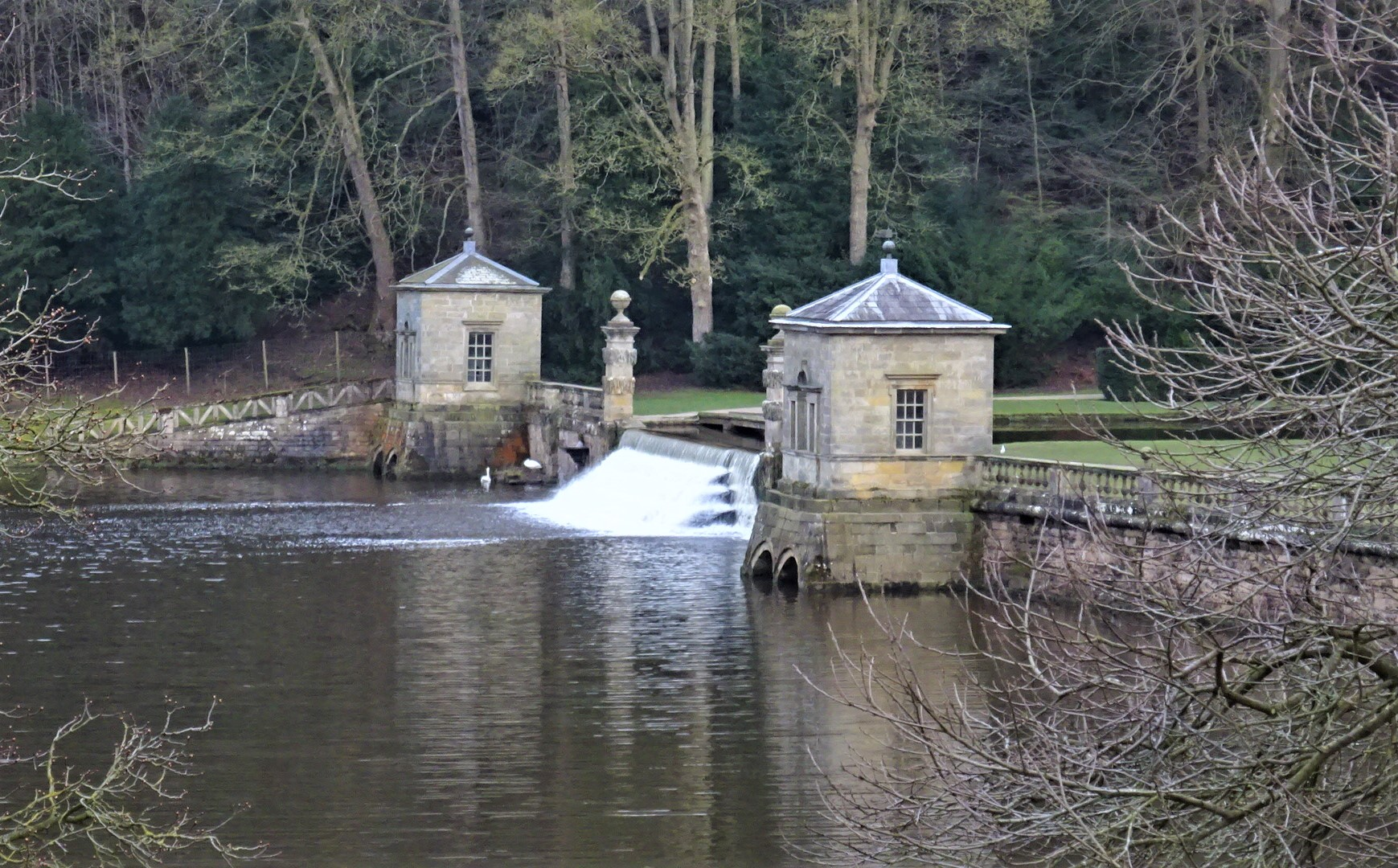
Fishing tabernacles and cascade, Studley Royal Water Gardens, Yorkshire

In the medieval era monasteries and manorial estates would use structures called stew ponds to keep caught fish fresh for the table out of necessity. As the population grew, building lodges closer to the fishing became more practical. The Abbot's Fish House in Meare was built as a lodge for the chief fisherman at Glastonbury Abbey. In Ireland, a monks' fishing house for Cong Abbey on an island in the River Cong built in the 15th century provided a lodge for monks fishing. The house is built on a platform of stones over a small arch which allows the river to flow underneath the floor. There is a trapdoor in the floor in which the fish may have been kept fresh.

Fishing huts (sometimes called Fishing Pavilions or Fishing Tabernacles) experienced their renaissance in the seventeenth century, as fishing for pleasure became a more popular pastime due to factors like the publication of The Compleat Angler by Izaak Walton. Their purpose was to provide lodging, a shelter and tackle store, for anglers, primarily of salmon and trout (other fish such as the sturgeon, were/are legally Royal fish and thus carried restrictions).

The huts were built in various architectural styles, sometimes incorporating Chinoiserie.

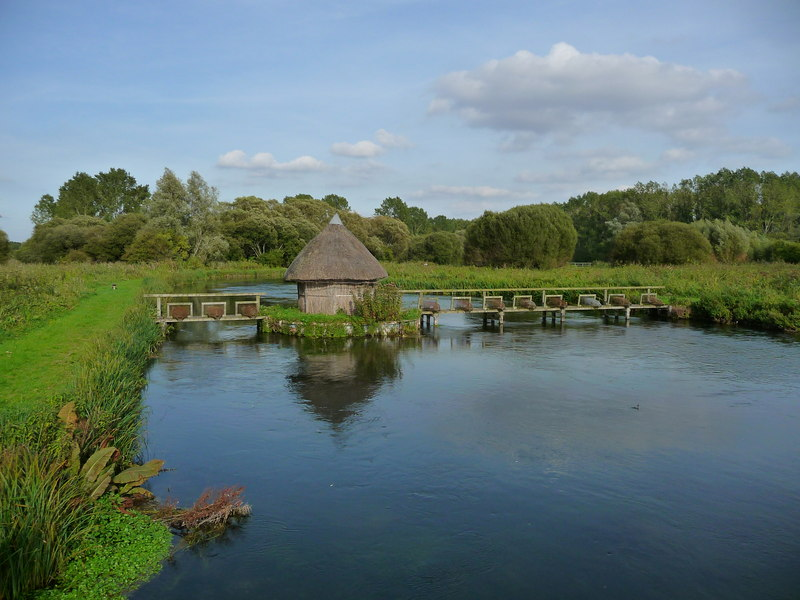
Longstock - Fishing Hut

Fishing huts built on salmon rivers for fishing salmon and sea trout are different to those built on trout streams. On most salmon rivers the fishing hut is built opposite the most yielding and prolific pool. It is design to be a place to allow the fisher to warm up, because salmon fishing is regarded as more rigorous than trout fishing. Trout fishing huts, often by ponds or streams, are designed to be smaller, and provide shelter from summer rain.

Oakley or Halford’s hut at Mottisfont on the Test is perhaps one of the most historically important, as it is where Frederic M. Halford wrote his book Floating Flies and How to Dress Them. Of arguably even greater historic importance is Charles Cotton's Fishing Hut, built 1674 on the Banks of the River Dove and which was used by Izaak Walton.

In the Norfolk Broads a structure called an Eel Sett provided a similar function for eel fishing, but for commercial eel fishermen. Though historically there were many of these setts in England the listed Eel Sett at Candle Dyke in the parish of Potter Heigham dating from the early 20th century, is now thought to be the last in England.

Big game fishing for Atlantic bluefin tuna (known as tunny fish) experienced brief popularity with the British upper classes in the 1930s, who undertook big-game tunny fishing off Scarborough during the hunting season from August and September. Though this did not require a conventional fishing hut, the British Tunny Club converted an old inn in the harbour for the purposes of a headquarters, for weighing catches and for storing equipment.

=== Shooting Boxes ===
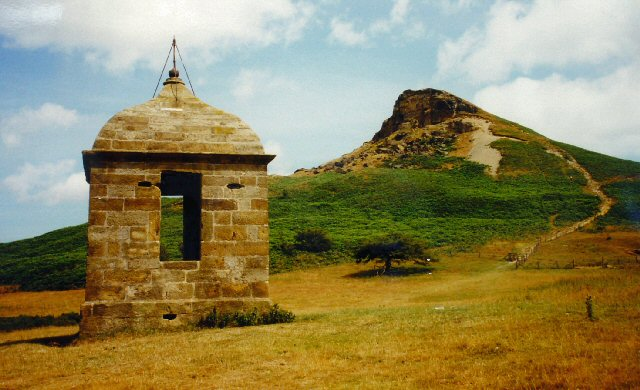
Old disused Shooting Pavilion below Roseberry Topping, North Yorkshire

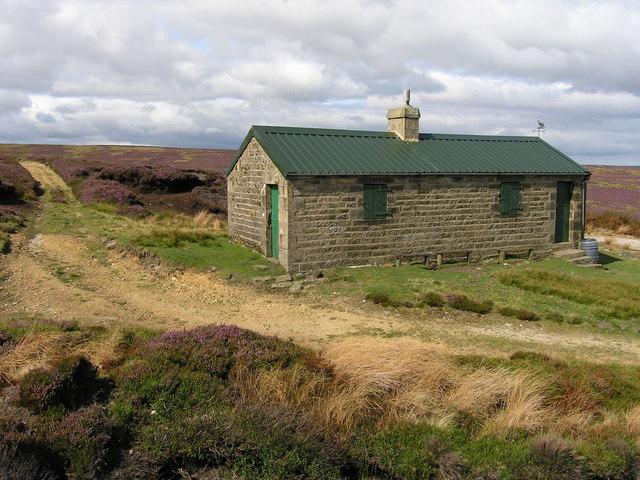
A remote shooting Box on Heathfield Moor in North Yorkshire

As firearms became more ubiquitous and game shooting became a more popular pastime with the British upper classes shooting boxes (or sometimes shooting pavilions) were constructed to help facilitate the sport across larger estates. A shooting box was an often small, remote lodge, designed to provide a shelter for those shooting. They were often basic affairs, similar to a bothy, but would usually at least have room for food to be eaten, and a fire to dry out and warm up when the weather was inclement. However some shooting boxes were established as grand sporting lodges in their own right. Occasionally their remote location meant they served as a spiritual successor to the banqueting houses of the old Prodigy House era. Outside the sporting season they could provide a location for picnics with a view over the estate. Older buildings in good locations, such as remote disused gatekeepers lodges, could often be repurposed into shooting boxes. For example, Affeton Castle was a ruined gatehouse for a former Manor House in East Worlington, restored in 1868 to serve as a shooting box. Cranbourne Tower in Windsor Royal Park was refurbished into a shooting box for the King and Edward VII was said to use it every season.

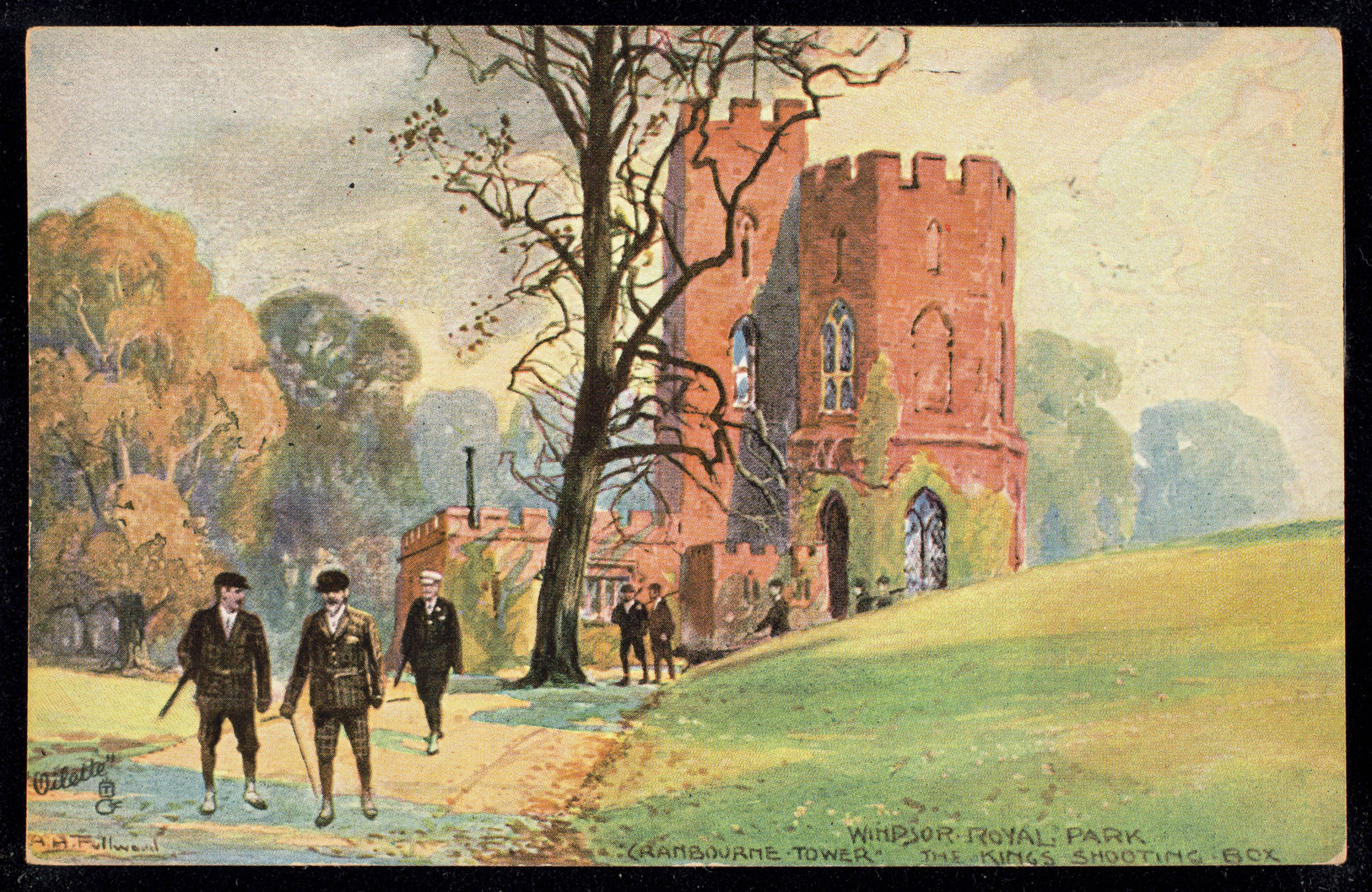
Windsor Royal Park Cranbourne Tower. The King's Shooting Box

As the wealth to maintain ancillary buildings declined many shooting boxes were turned into domestic dwellings. In the most remote estates, covered shooting butts and hides often had to double up as rudimentary shooting boxes, providing a shelter and a place to eat while shooting.

=== Waterfowlers Huts ===
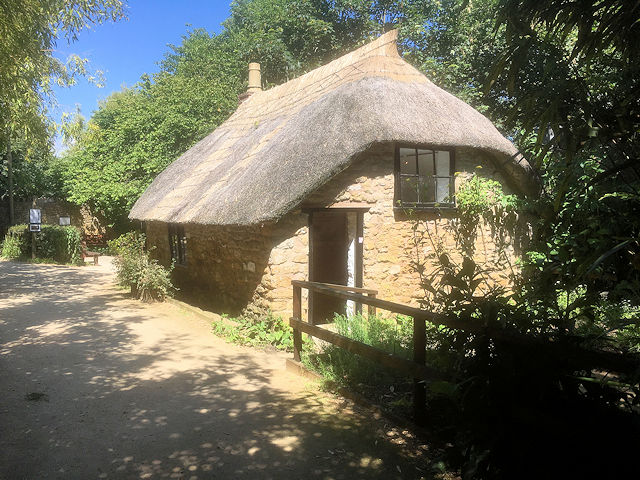
Decoyman's Hut, Abbotsbury Swannery

Waterfowl hunting had long been a popular sport in the British isles and became more popular with the invention of the matchlock rifle. Swans are notable, as they have long been the exclusive quarry of the sovereign with the rights to hunt and eat them granted only sparingly, remembered in the tradition of swan upping. Despite the popularity of the sport, Waterfowlers Huts (Wildflowers Lodges) are less common than other purpose built shooting lodges across the British isles. In the 17th century duck decoys, such as the one at Boarstall became used by large country estates as a method of hunting vast numbers of ducks, often with a dog (especially in England where wildfowl shooting rights were restricted until the mid 1800s), and typically more for economic purposes (supplying ducks for the table) rather than sporting. A ruined Decoymans lodge exists at Decoy Heath, built in 1724 by the Drax family of Charborough Park. Another restored Decoy Hut exists at the Strangways family estate Abbotsbury Swannery.

=== Mews ===
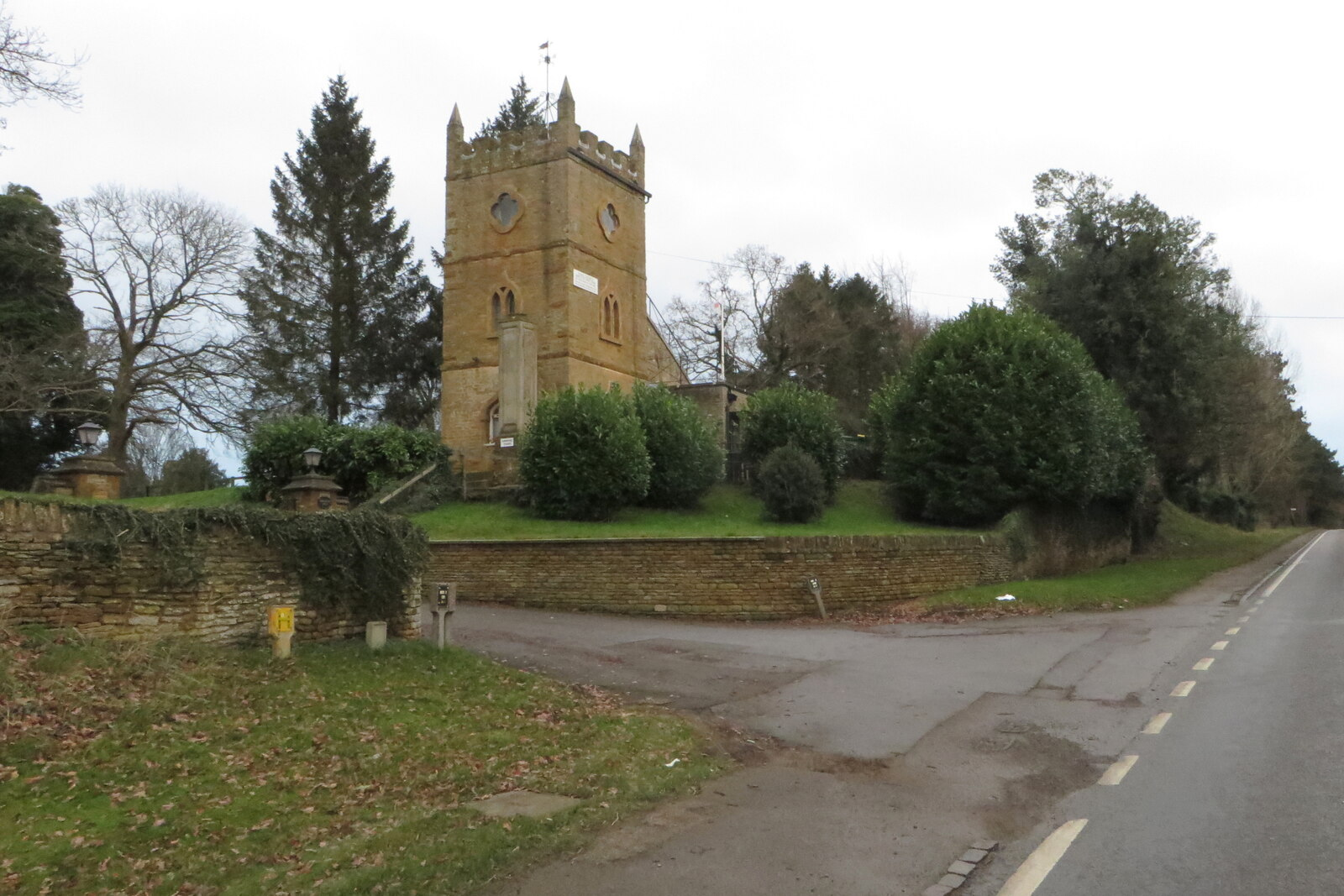
Boughton Hall Hawking Tower

Falconry or hawking has a long history in the British isles. The word mews derives from the French word 'muer', meaning "to moult," as the buildings housed birds of prey during their moulting period when they were not used for hunting. Falconry or Hawking was popular among the English aristocracy, mostly during the medieval era, and the maintenance of birds of prey meant providing structures to care for and house them. These structures could be simple, built to house the birds, or could incorporate more complex elements to provide lodging and vantage points for participants and spectators.

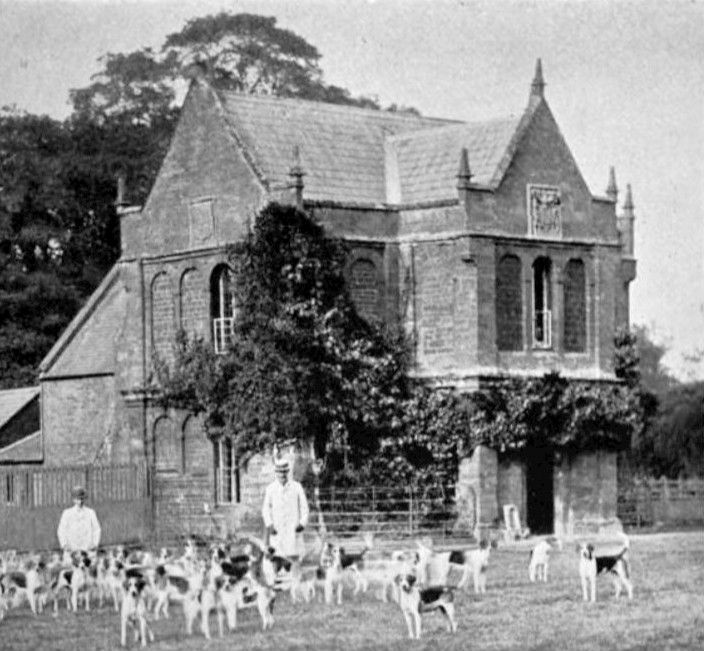
Hawking or Falconry Tower at Althorp

Hawking towers for instance provided an elevated vantage point for both the falconers and the birds. One notable example is the hawking tower at Althorp. It was built in 1611 in anticipation of a royal visit, with a large open arcaded first floor for spectating falconry. Another example is the castellated hawking tower at Broughon built by Second Earl of Strafford and Wentworth around the late 1730s. One of the most famous mews buildings is the Royal Mews at Charring Cross on the present site of the National Gallery in London. The building was destroyed in a fire during the reign of Henry VIII in 1534 and rebuilt as stables, but kept the name 'Mews' even though it had a different function.

== Lodge Transport ==
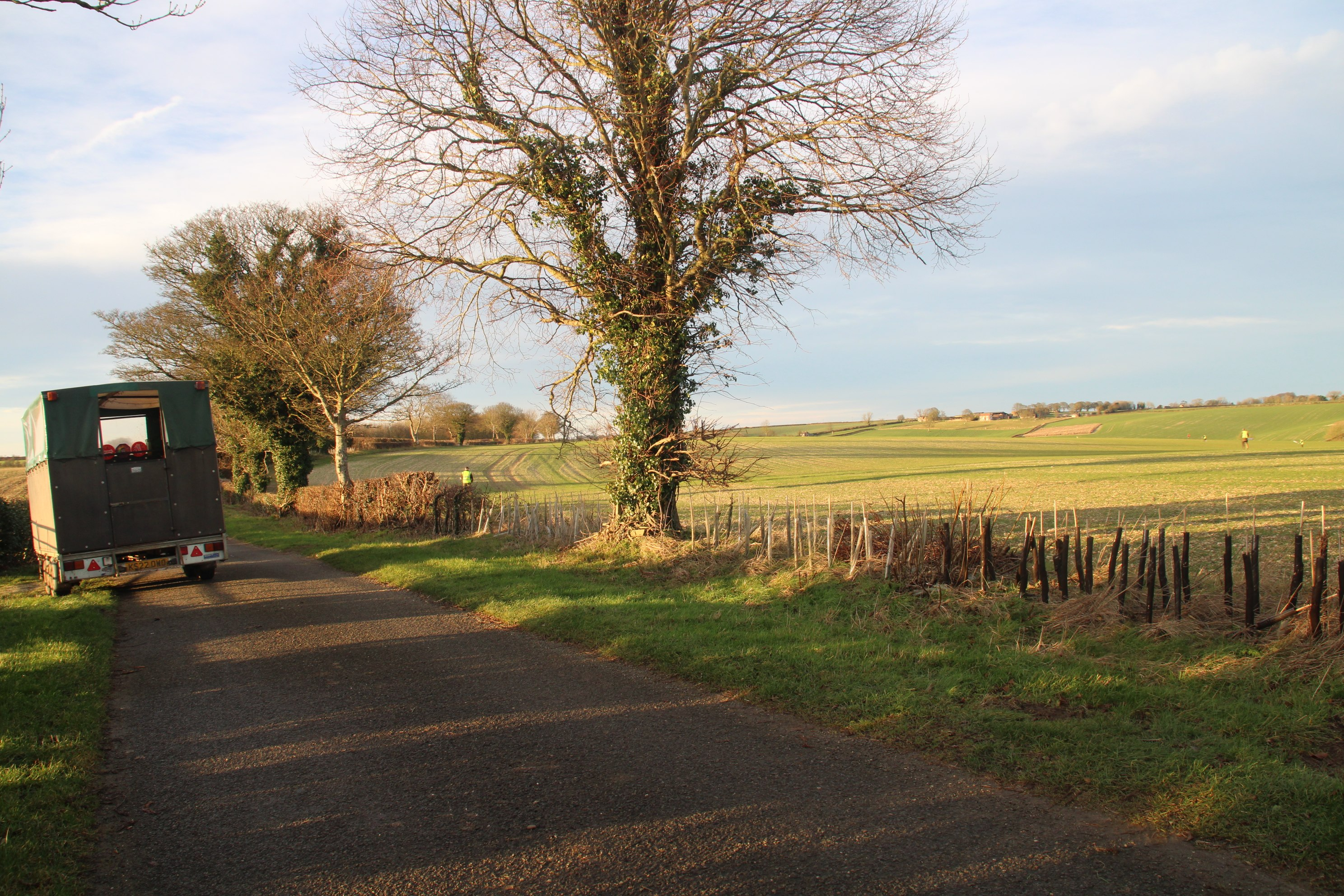
A Gun Bus at the side of the road for a shoot

Once at a sporting lodge transport is often required to traverse around the shooting estate. The transport is often required to carry equipment necessary for hunting. On a shooting estate this is often a 'gun bus', so called because it can transport both those participating in the shooting and their firearms. These are often Land Rovers, converted tractor trailers, or former military troop-transport. Estate workers often provide support with AATVs, open pick up back vehicles. Shooting brake and estate vehicles are also popular for individual shooters, as they provide space for gun dogs and equipment.

Many shoots in Scotland continue to use highland ponies as a method of recovery when stalking. This requires special deer saddles, some of which may be more than a hundred years old.

== See also ==
- Beach hut
- Bothy
- Cottage orné
- Fish pond
- Game larder
- Gamekeepers in the United Kingdom
- Gatekeeper's lodge
- Gillie
- Hunting blind
- Ice shanty
- Jagdschloss
- Medieval hunting
- Shooting brake
