= List of scheduled monuments in Cheshire since 1539 =

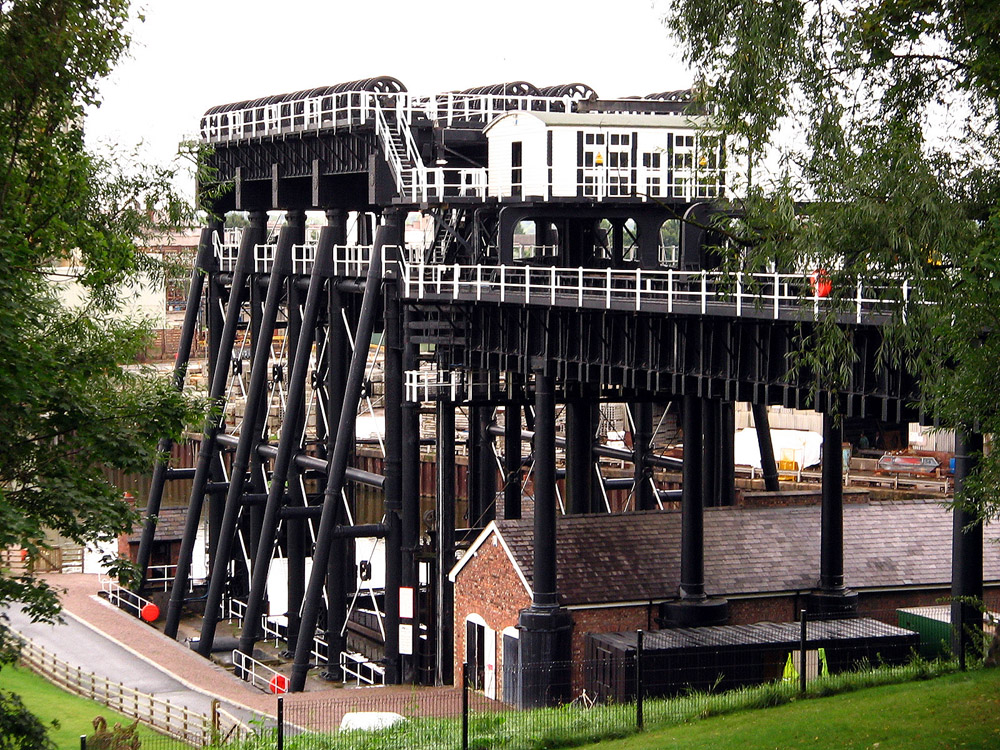
Anderton Boat Lift

There are over two hundred scheduled monuments in Cheshire, a county in North West England, which date from the Neolithic period to the middle of the 20th century. This list includes the scheduled monuments in Cheshire from 1540 to the present, the periods accepted by Revealing Cheshire's Past as post-medieval and modern.

A scheduled monument is a nationally important archaeological site or monument which is given legal protection by being placed on a list (or "schedule") by the Secretary of State for Culture, Media and Sport; English Heritage takes the leading role in identifying such sites. The current legislation supporting this is the Ancient Monuments and Archaeological Areas Act 1979. The term "monument" can apply to the whole range of archaeological sites, and they are not always visible above ground. Such sites have to have been deliberately constructed by human activity. They range from prehistoric standing stones and burial sites, through Roman remains and medieval structures such as castles and monasteries, to later structures such as industrial sites and buildings constructed for the World Wars or the Cold War.

This list includes structures dating from the early post-medieval period, through the period of the Industrial Revolution, to sites prepared for warfare in the 20th century. The monuments from the earlier part of the period tend to be similar in type to those in the medieval period, namely moats or moated sites, and churchyard crosses and also include a dovecote and a duck decoy. Structures dating from the Industrial Revolution include the remains of a mine, canal locks and a bridge, a salt works, a boat lift, and a transporter bridge within a factory. The structures dating from the 20th century consist of a former Royal Air Force airfield and the remains of three sites for anti-aircraft guns.

Name	Remains	Location	Date	Description
Anderton Boat Lift	Boat lift	Anderton; 53.2727°N 2.5305°W	1875	An electrical lift to raise and lower boats between the Weaver Navigation and the Trent and Mersey Canal.
Armada Beacon	Mound of earth and stone	Alderley Edge; 53.2959°N 2.2126°W	16th century	The foundations of the platform for one of a series of beacons in response to the threat of invasion. The beacon was restored in 1779 and blown down in 1931.
Aston dovecote	Dovecote	Aston; 53.2974°N 2.6719°W	1691	A dovecote on the site of Aston Old Hall. One of the few double dovecotes in England, now without a roof or dividing wall.
Bank Quay Transporter Bridge	Transporter bridge	Warrington; 53.3821°N 2.6091°W	1913–15	This a disused transporter bridge within the works of Joseph Crosfield and Sons. It is also a Grade II* listed building.
Beeston lock	Canal lock	Beeston; 53.1343°N 2.6682°W	1827–28	A unique cast iron lock designed by Thomas Telford on the Shropshire Union Canal.
Bunbury locks	Canal locks	Bunbury; 53.1269°N 2.6323°W	1775–79	Locks on the Shropshire Union Canal, with the associated bridge and stables. The locks are also listed at Grade II*.
Burton Manor icehouse	Icehouse	Burton; 53.2591°N 3.0287°W	Early 19th century	An ice house in the grounds of Burton Manor. It is cut in rock and has gas lighting and a food preparation area, which are both unusual features.
Crossley (or Colleymill) Bridge	Bridge	Congleton; 53.1892°N 2.1640°W	17th–18th century	A two-arched stone bridge carrying the A54 road over the River Dane. It is also listed at Grade II.
Danebower colliery chimney	Stone chimney	Wildboarclough; 53.2266°N 1.9871°W	Early 19th century	A stone chimney for ventilation of the colliery.
Daresbury	Mersey flat	Sutton; 53.30109°N 2.68885°W	18th century	The remains of the only known Mersey flat dating from before 1840.
Former soda ash and calcium nitrate works	Foundations of chemical works	Plumley; 53.2710°N 2.4408°W	Early 20th century	The remains of factories, one producing soda ash by the ammonia-soda process, and the other producing calcium nitrate.
Gawsworth Old Hall	Earthworks, walls	Gawsworth; 53.2226°N 2.1647°W	Post-medieval	The remains of an Elizabethan garden and five ornamental pools that were probably constructed by Sir Edward Fitton III for open air entertainment.
Great Moreton Hall icehouse tower	Tower	Moreton cum Alcumlow; 53.1327°N 2.2396°W	1841	This consists of a castellated tower over a tunnel leading to an icehouse. It is also listed at Grade II.
Hale Duck Decoy	Duck decoy	Hale; 53.3385°N 2.7853°W	17th century	A pentagonal ditched enclosure containing a central pond and five curving arms. It has been restored as a nature reserve.
Huntington Hall	Bridge and causeway	Huntington; 53.1651°N 2.8694°W	Post-medieval	Sandstone bridge and causeway leading to platform for former moated manor house or grange.
Jodrell Bank dovecote and pigsty	Brick building	Twemlow; 53.2286°N 2.3056°W	Late 17th century	A three-storey brick structure of which the lowest storey is a pigsty and the upper two storeys constitute a dovecote.
Kinderton Hall gardens	Earthworks	Kinderton; 53.1995°N 2.4392°W	Post-medieval	Earthworks of a former formal garden to the west of the medieval moat, including a prospect mound.
Lion Salt Works	Salt works	Marston; 53.2753°N 2.4949°W	1842	An open pan salt works in operation until 1986. It is now a museum and some of the surviving buildings are also listed at Grade II.
Lymm Hall cockpits	Cockpits	Lymm; 53.3793°N 2.4769°W	17th century	Two well-preserved but overgrown cockpits built in sandstone rubble and earth.
Marton Grange	Earthworks and a stone	Marton; 53.2036°N 2.5662°W	Post-Medieval	A former manor house which was demolished in 1848. The site was previously occupied by a medieval monastic grange. The monument also includes the sandstone socket stone which was previously the base of a cross.
Murgatroyd brine shaft	Underground mine shaft	Middlewich; 53.1903°N 2.4359°W	1889	A brine shaft dug by made which contains three 20th-century pumps.
Newbold Astbury churchyard cross	Stone structure	Newbold Astbury; 53.1505°N 2.2315°W	16th century	This consists of an octagonal gritstone cross base forming two steps up to a base block which is also octagonal to which a later shaft has been added. It stands in St Mary's churchyard and is listed at Grade II.
Norley anti-aircraft battery	Foundations and buildings	Norley; 53.2981°N 2.3467°W	c. 1950	The foundations of housing for four heavy anti-aircraft guns, a reinforced concrete generator, the gunshed building and the command post.
Over churchyard cross	Stone structure	Over; 53.1816°N 2.5248°W	c. 1543	A yellow sandstone stepped octagonal base with the lower section of a shaft which has been truncated to form a sundial. It stands in St Chad's churchyard and is listed at Grade II.
Overton	Earthworks	Overton; 53.0294°N 2.7872°W	Medieval and post-medieval	Platforms for buildings, hollow ways and ridge and furrow cultivation remains suggest a deserted village.
Pickett-Hamilton fort	Underground workings	Burtonwood; 53.4091°N 2.6541°W	1940–41	The underground remains of a former USAAF fort with rusted items, including hydraulic jacks, which lie under a circular concrete slab.
Poynton Hall icehouse	Brick structure	Poynton; 53.3548°N 2.1074°W	c. 1758	Built from local sandstone, most of the icehouse is below ground level. It is listed at Grade II.
Puddington anti-aircraft gunsite	Buildings	Puddington; 53.2530°N 2.9970°W	c. 1941	Remains of four gun pits, the command post and ruined ancillary buildings. Built in the Second World War to house heavy anti-aircraft guns.
RAF Cranage	Airfield	Cranage; 53.2263°N 2.4093°W	1939	An airfield used by the RAF during the Second World War. Included are the Defence Headquarters, a gun pit, an aircrew sleeping shelter, and four pillboxes (three complete and one demolished).
Shocklach churchyard cross	Stone structure	Shocklach; 53.0458°N 2.8492°W	Post-medieval	This is in red sandstone and consists of three steps and a plinth with a partly restored shaft in St Edith's churchyard. It is listed at Grade II.
Sutton anti-aircraft gunsite	Gun emplacements and buildings	Sutton Weaver; 53.3090°N 2.6783°W	1940	This was a heavy anti-aircraft gunsite built in the Second World War. The remains consist of five gun emplacements, the command post, two garages and a generator building.
Tilstone Hall gateway	Ruin	Tarporley; 53.1433°N 2.6399°W	Late 16th/early 17th century	The ruin of a gateway to a house which was demolished about 1740. It is also listed at Grade II.
West Mine Plant	Industrial site	Nether Alderley; 53.2942°N 2.2112°W	19th century	A mining complex in the mid-19th century producing and treating copper, lead and cobalt ores.
Wrenbury lifting bridge	Bridge	Wrenbury; 53.0281°N 2.6128°W	c. 1790	A wooden lifting bridge carrying a road over the Llangollen Canal designed by Thomas Telford. It is also listed at Grade II.

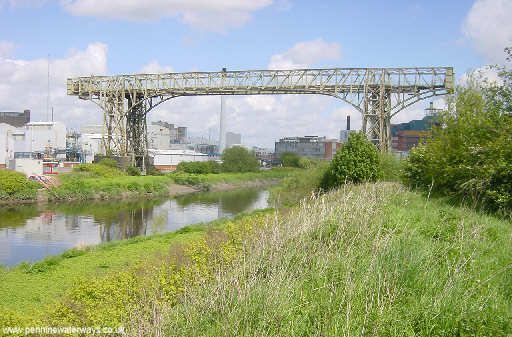
Bank Quay Transporter Bridge

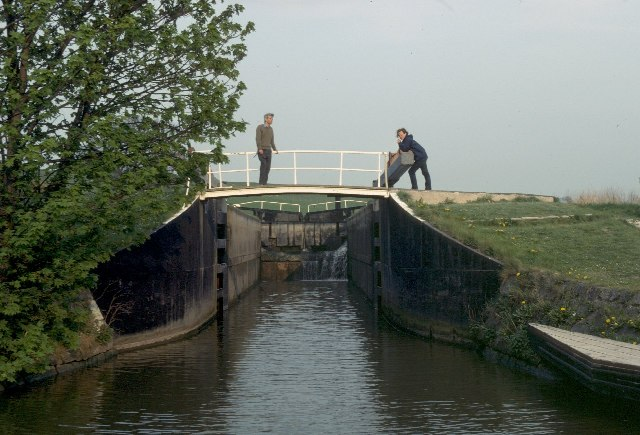
Beeston lock

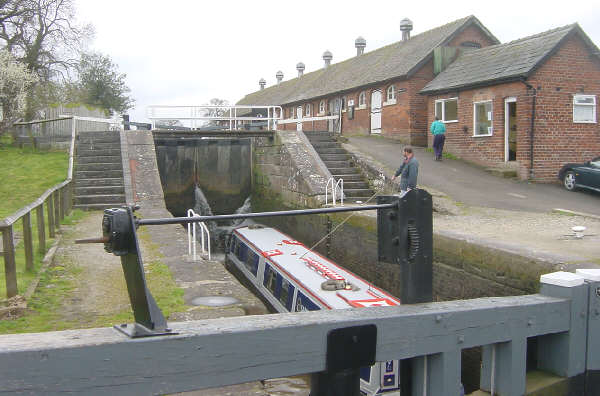
Bunbury locks

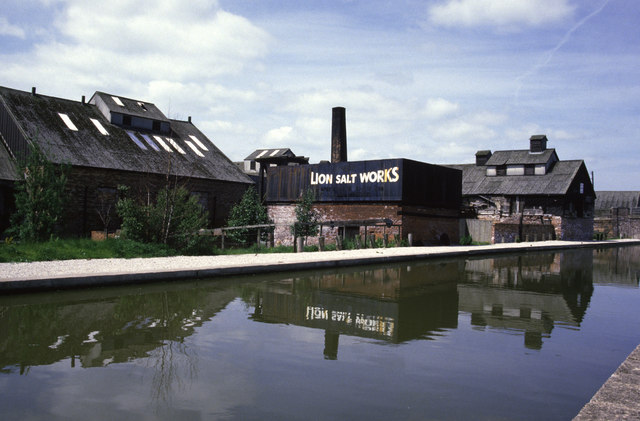
Lion Salt Works

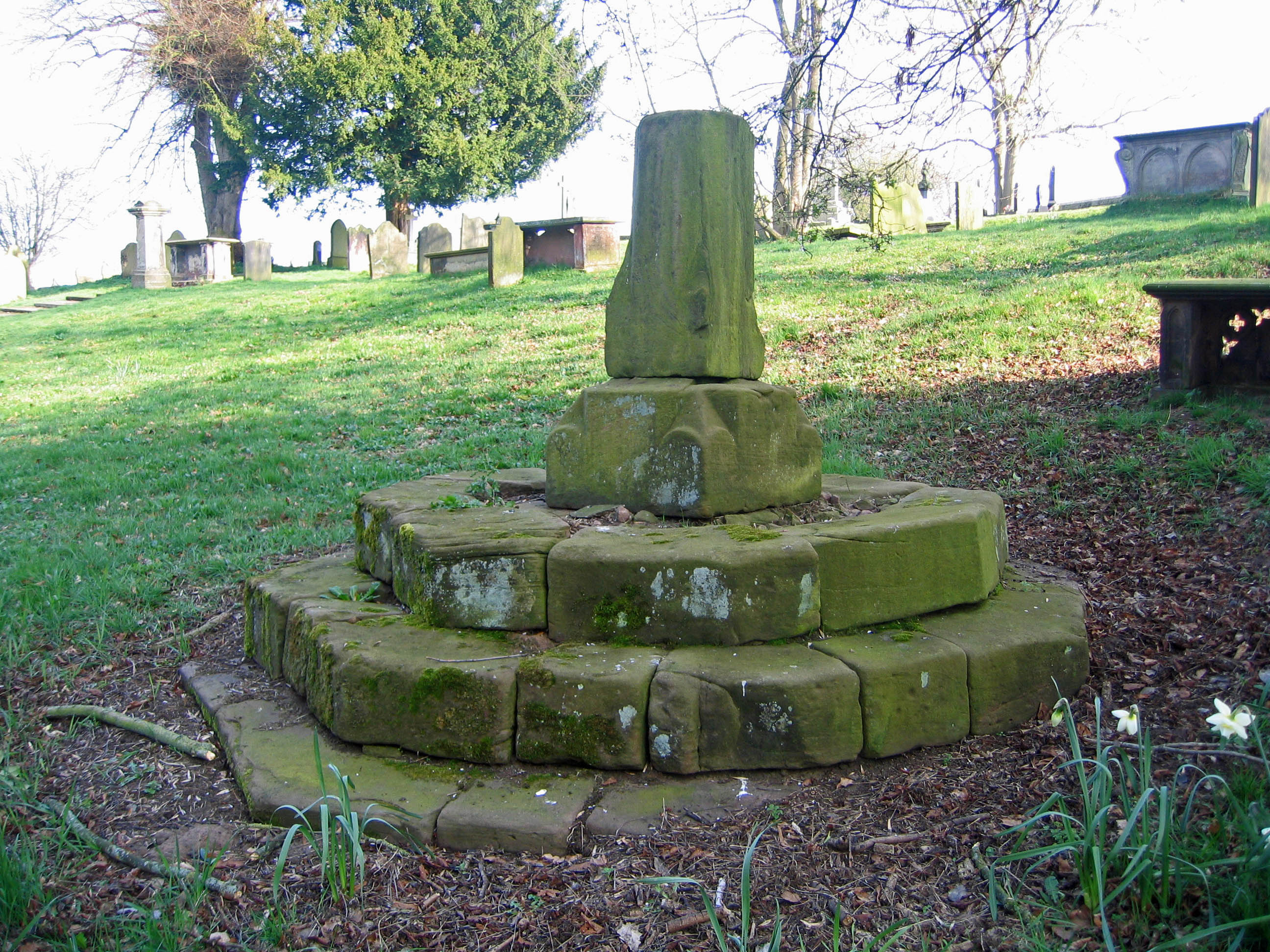
Over churchyard cross

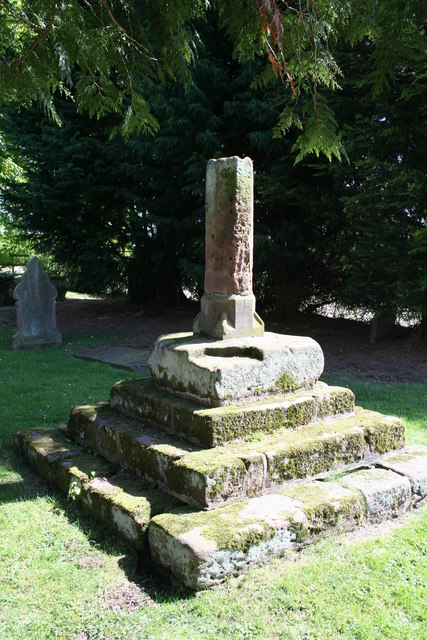
Shocklach churchyard cross

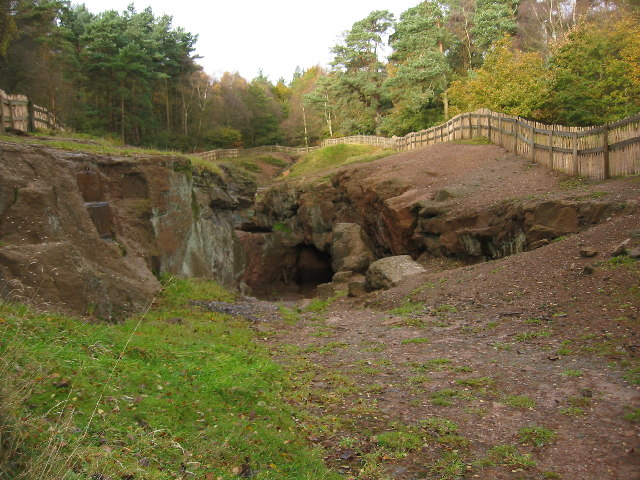
An entry to one of the mines in the West Mine Plant on Alderley Edge

== See also ==
- List of scheduled monuments in Cheshire dated to before 1066
- List of scheduled monuments in Cheshire (1066–1539)
