= Ira Hudson =

American sculptor

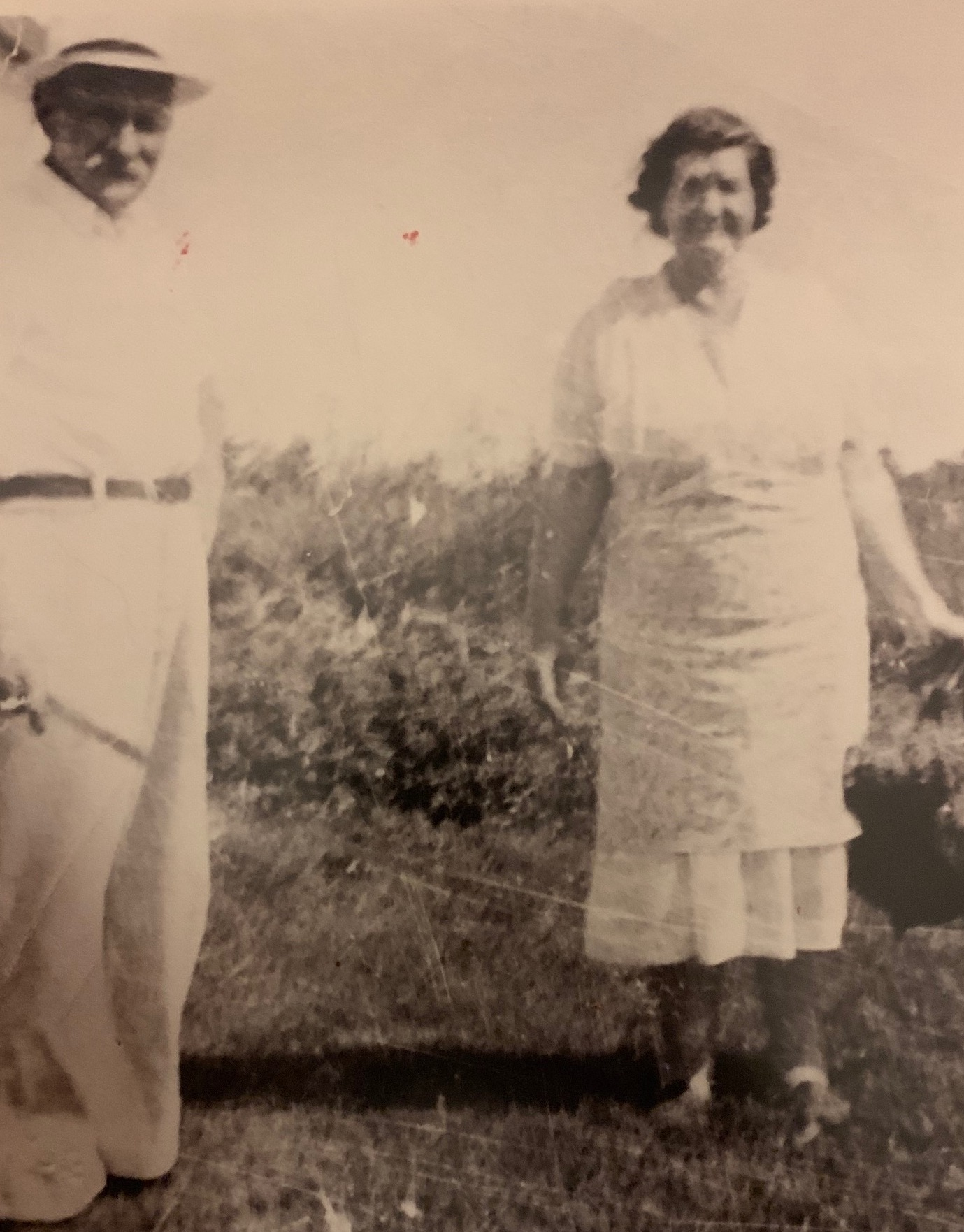
- Ira Hudson and his wife Eva at home in Chincoteague
- Known for: decoy carving

Ira Hudson (1873 - 1949) was an American boat builder and prolific decoy and shorebird carver from Chincoteague, Virginia. He created over 20,000 decoys during his lifetime, full sized and miniatures.

Hudson's carvings were primarily of local waterfowl, using no patterns so each carving had a unique design. The decoys were carved out of available materials including ship masts and telephone poles. By the early 1900s people had begun collecting decoys for decorative purposes and Hudson was one of the first carvers to add details such as feet and wings to his carvings in response.

Hudson has been called a "legendary name" in decoy carving. His decoys, which sold for $4 for a dozen during his lifetime, sell at auction for tens of thousands of dollars.

The "Hudson style" of decoy usually includes a flowing bill shape and a full flowing or "fat football" shaped body, though he experimented with many styles. He used feather and scratch painting, and carved both rounded and flat-bottomed decoys.

== Personal life ==
Hudson lived in Chincoteague with his wife Eva where they raised nine children, three of whom became commercially successful decoy carvers of their own. His grandson's L. Bob Hudson and Ira C. Hudson are also carvers.

Ira Hudson Carvings

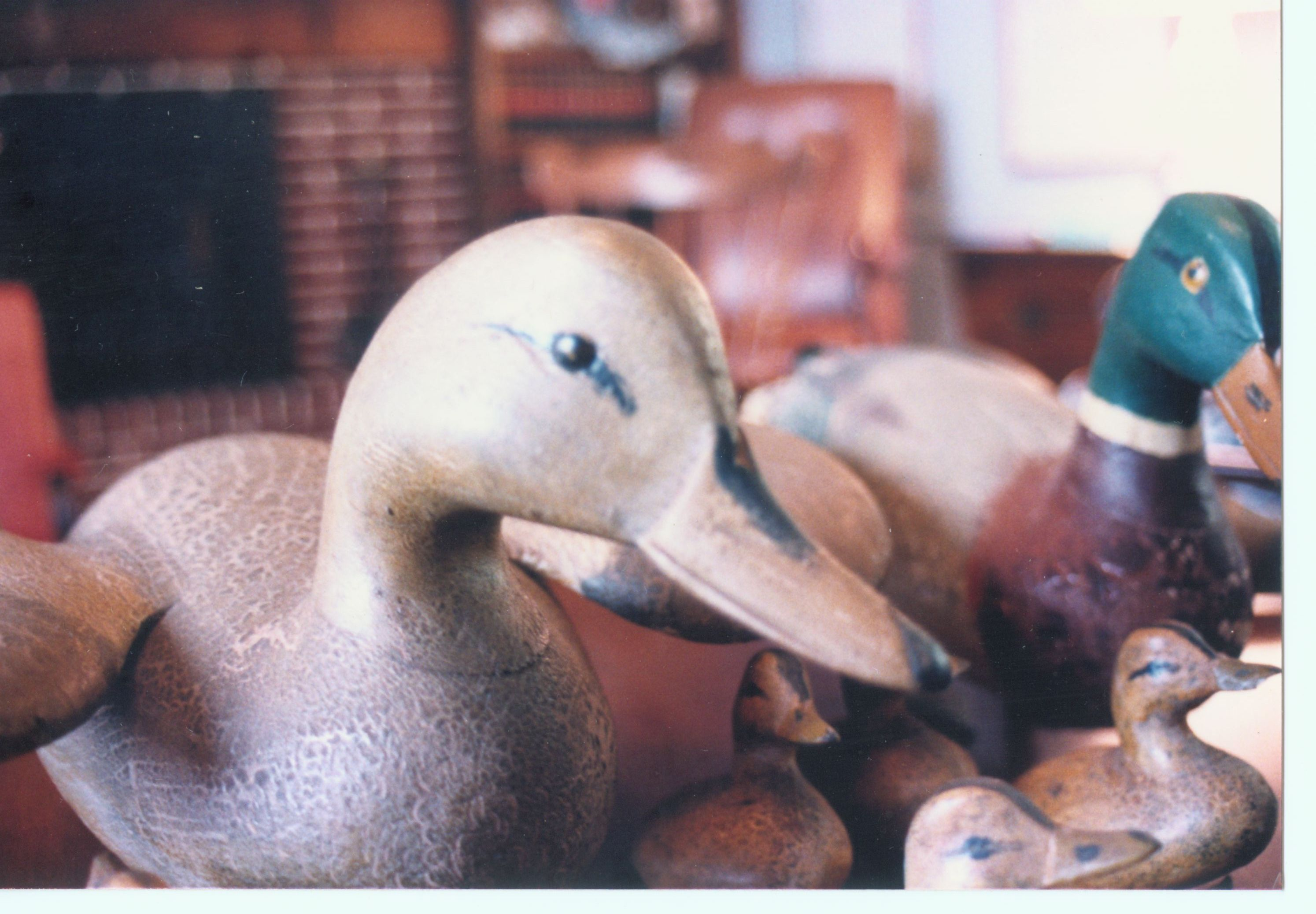
Room of decoys

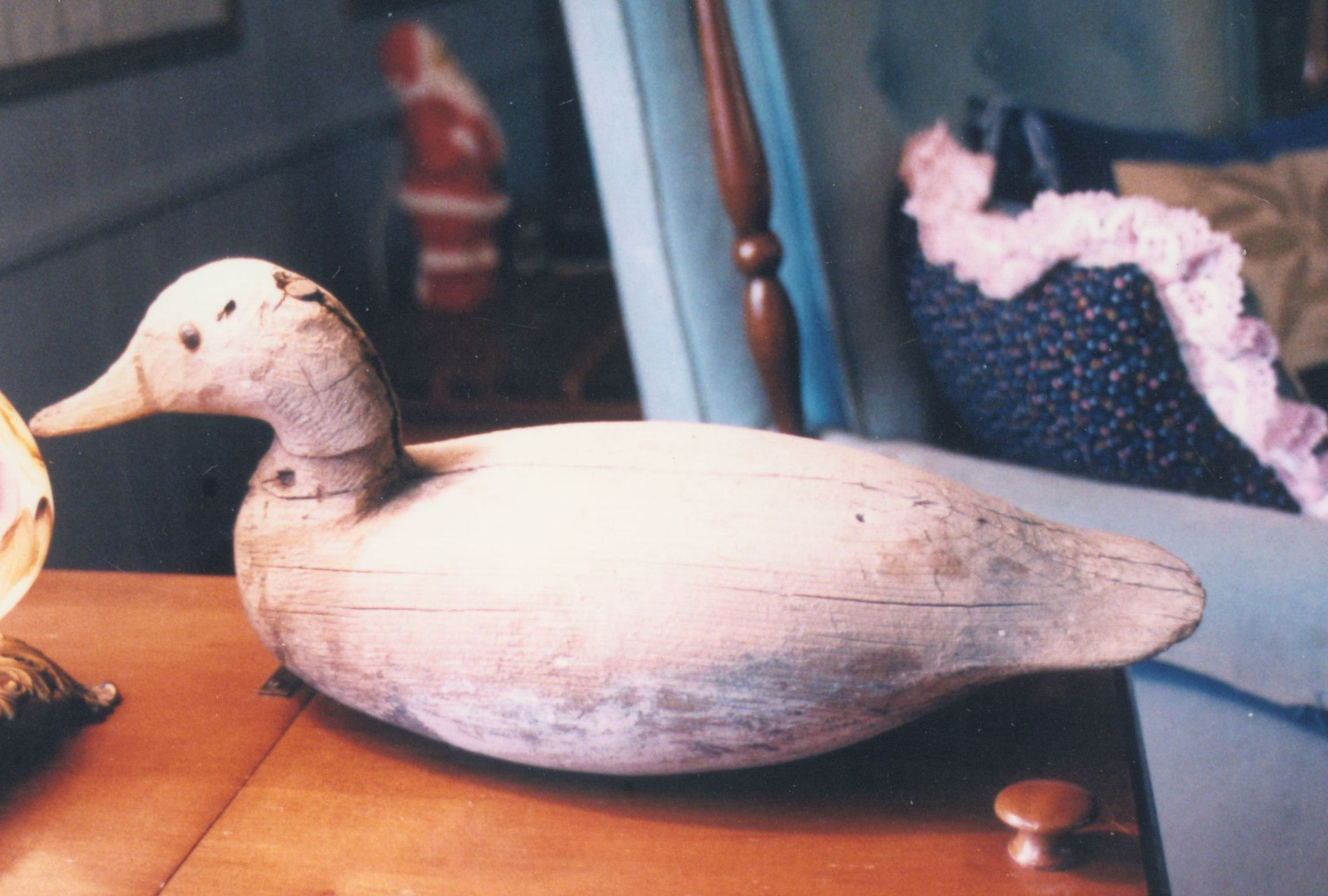
Decoy close-up

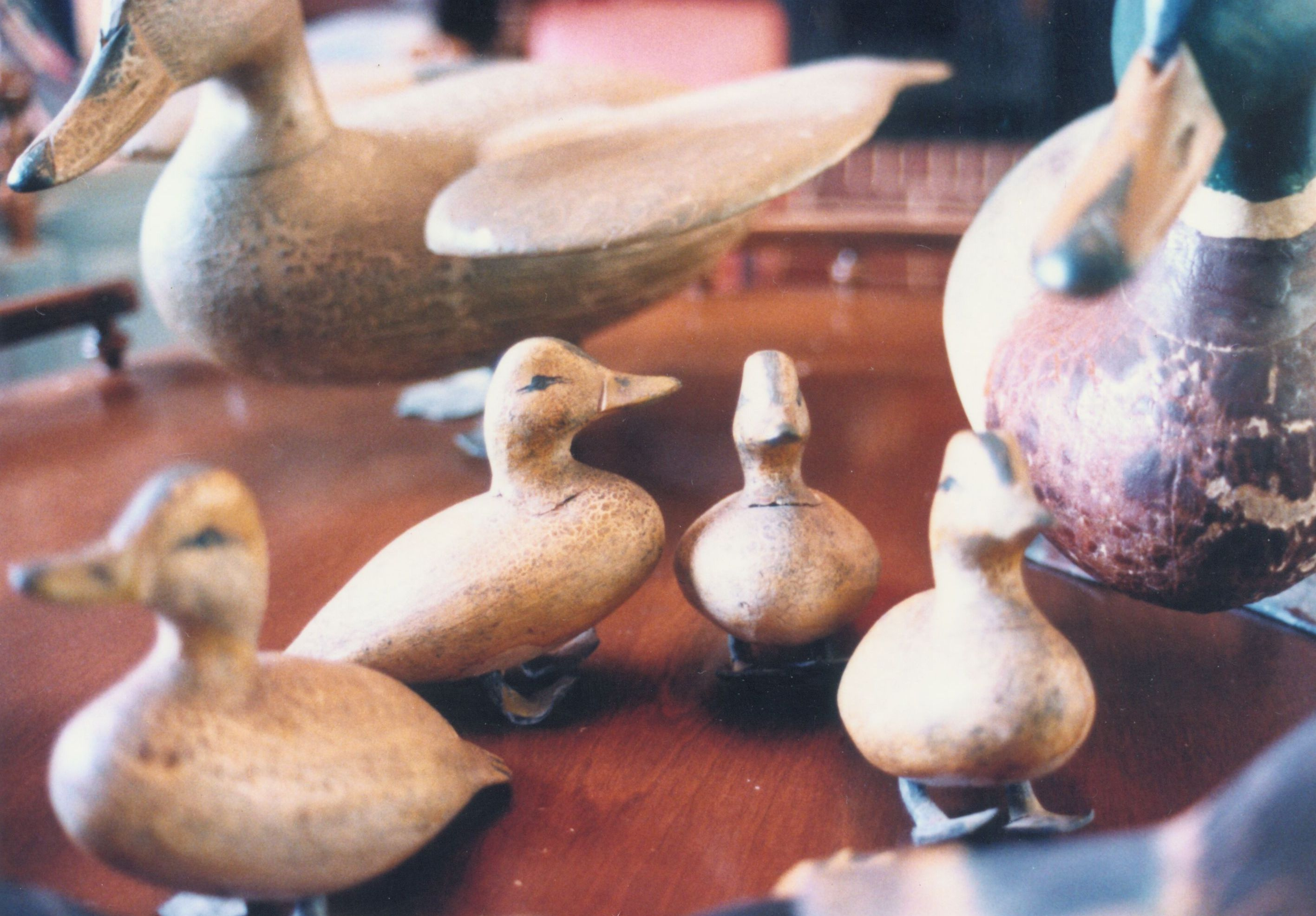
Miniature duck carvings

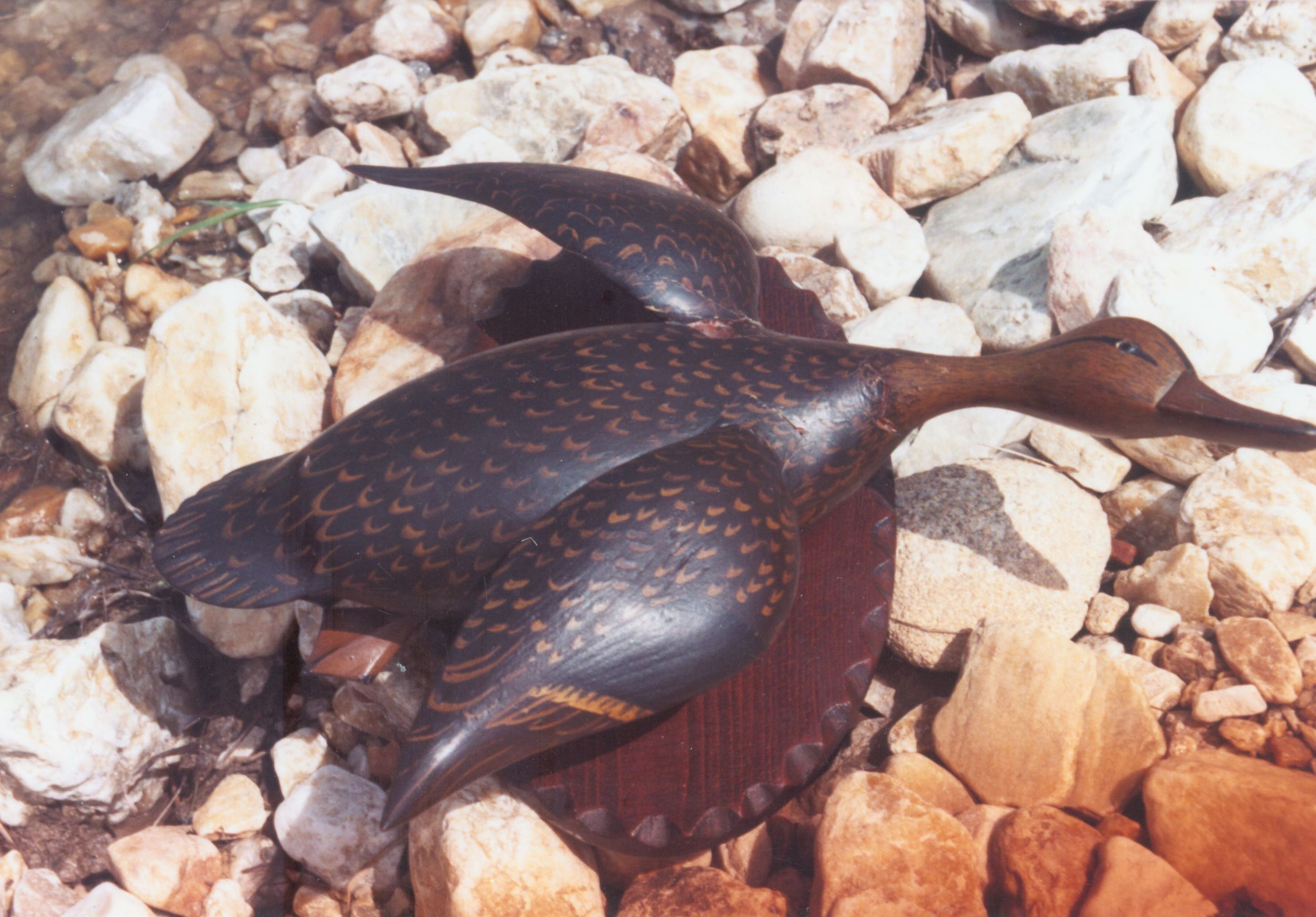
Single bird in flight carving
