= Daresbury (Mersey flat) =

Coordinates: 53.3015°N 2.6893°W

Daresbury was a Mersey flat that is now in a ruinous condition. It lies, partly submerged, in Sutton Lock on River Weaver in Cheshire, England. The lock and its contents are designated as a Scheduled Ancient Monument.

== Mersey flats ==
Mersey flats were sailing barges that were used in the inland waterways of Northwest England. They were carvel-built with rounded bilges and sterns, and had a shallow draught. As originally built, the flats had a single mast that could be lowered or lifted out. Typically they were about 70 feet (21.3 m) long by 14 feet (4.3 m) wide. Some flats were larger and could be used as small coasters. Other flats were unrigged and were designed to be pulled by horses or tugs, but strong enough to survive conditions on the river estuaries. The waterways in which the flats were used were the rivers Mersey, Dee and Weaver, and canals and navigations such as the Bridgewater Canal, the Sankey Canal, the Mersey and Irwell Navigation, the Weaver Navigation, the Rochdale Canal, the Chester Canal and the Leeds and Liverpool Canal.

== History ==
The Daresbury was constructed in 1772 by a boat builder named Samuel Edwards. By 1792–96 she was employed on the Weaver Navigation carrying coals. It is thought that she was lengthened in the early 1800s. At some time in the 19th century, possibly in 1864, she was converted into a floating derrick. Repairs were carried out on the vessel in 1926 and in 1934, and she was still afloat in 1956. She was moved to Sutton Locks on the River Weaver in 1985 and sunk. Plans were made to recover and restore her and to move her to the National Waterways Museum at Ellesmere Port, but these were found to be impractical and were abandoned.

== Location and description ==
The flat lies partly submerged towards the west end of Sutton Lock, with part of the hull above the water line. The barge measures 17.5 metres (57.4 ft) long by 4.88 metres (16.0 ft) long. The hold, about 9 metres (29.5 ft) long, is full of water. Also partly submerged, about 9 metres (29.5 ft) from the projected position of the bow of the barge, are some metal objects and a piece of timber, which are thought to have come from the Daresbury.

== Appraisal ==
The Daresbury was designated as a Scheduled Ancient Monument on 21 March 2014. Scheduling gives legal protection to an archaeological site that is considered to be of national importance. In the reasons given for scheduling, Daresbury is described as being "the only known pre-1840 survival of a once widespread regional sailing vessel". It has survived reasonably well and has retained a number of key characteristics, and has the potential for providing insight into the construction of boats in the 18th century. There is also "abundant contemporary documentation" about this particular vessel. The area covered by the scheduling is the whole of Sutton Lock, an area measuring a maximum of 37 metres (121.4 ft) by 7 metres (23.0 ft); this is to ensure that any fixtures from the vessel that have been detached are also included.

== See also ==
- List of Scheduled Monuments in Cheshire since 1539
