= Boarstall Duck Decoy =

Waterfowl trap in England

Coordinates: 51°49′52″N 01°05′48″W

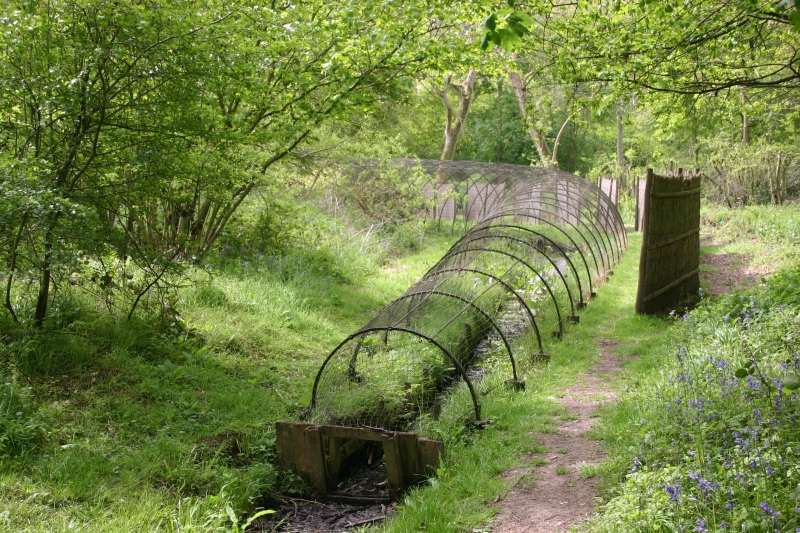
The end of the tunnel.

The Boarstall Duck Decoy is a 17th-century duck decoy located in Boarstall, Buckinghamshire, England, and now a National Trust property. The system took advantage of a two-acre lake with pipe-cage tunnels running out of it.

At one time a common sight in the English countryside, only four duck decoys now remain. The Boarstall Duck Decoy is still in working order, and is surrounded by 13 acres (53,000 m^{2}) of natural woodland.

The intent of the decoy was to catch large numbers of waterfowl. A decoy or fake duck was used to attract birds onto a small patch of water. The pond was equipped with a long cone-shaped wickerwork tunnel. A "decoyman" with a trained dog then herded the birds into the tunnel. Once the birds had been trapped in the tunnel, they could then be caught as required. Originally, the birds trapped here were a source of food. The advantage over simply shooting the birds was that ducks caught by this method did not have pellets or lead shot in their bodies that would have to be removed prior to consumption, allowing them to command higher prices. Today, the National Trust organise demonstrations, and any birds caught are ringed for ornithological study. One duck apparently traveled as far away as Turkey.
