= Hale Duck Decoy =

Waterfowl trap and nature reserve in England

Coordinates: 53.3385°N 2.7854°W

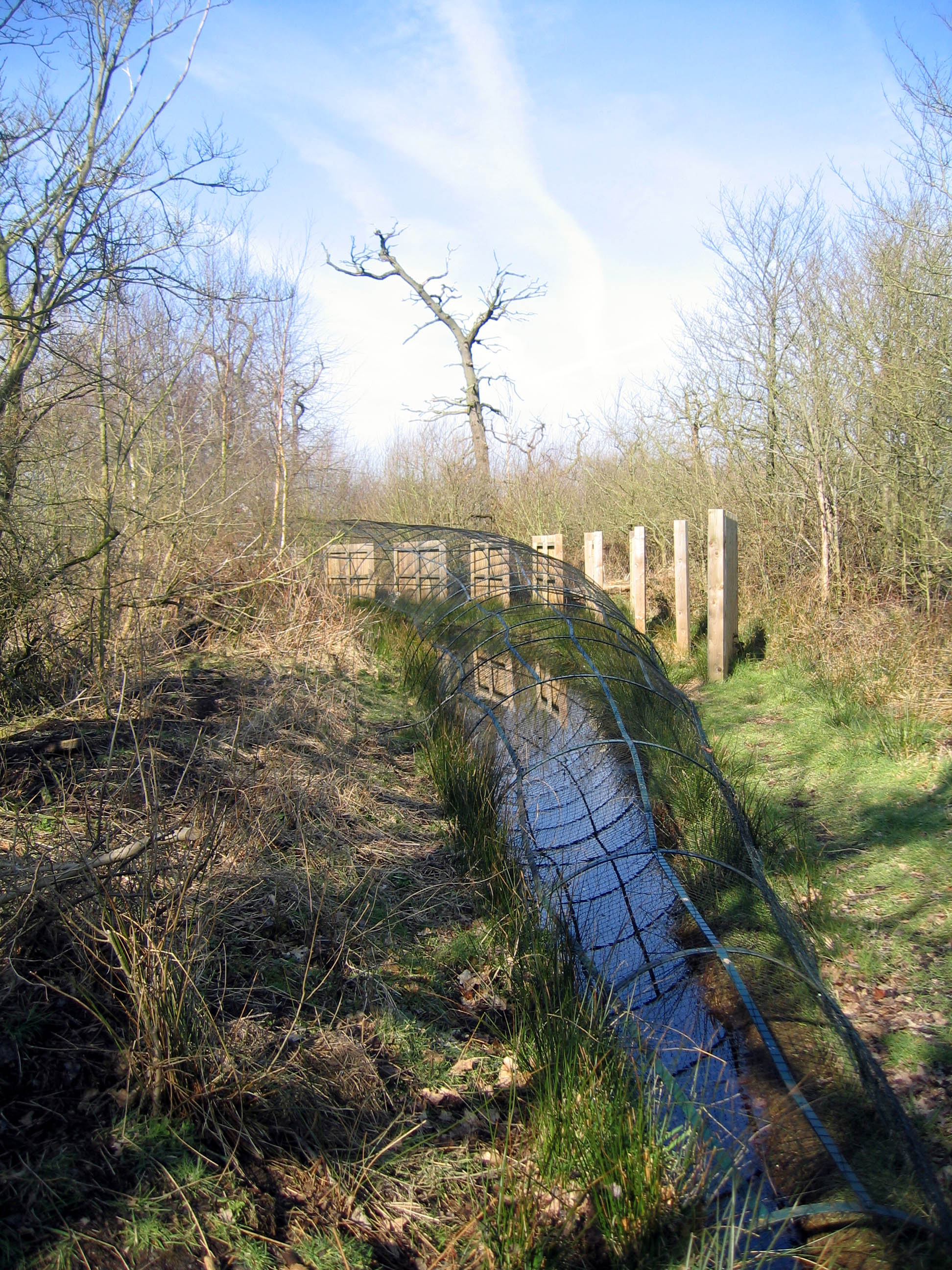
One of the pipes of the decoy showing hoops covered with netting and the arrangement of the screens

Hale Duck Decoy is a duck decoy and nature reserve near the village of Hale, in Halton, Cheshire, England. The site is a Scheduled Ancient Monument and lies within a Site of Special Scientific Interest. It is owned by the Fleetwood-Hesketh Estate and managed by Halton Borough Council together with a group of volunteers.

== History ==
The precise date of the construction of the duck decoy is not known, but there is evidence that it was built in the 17th century. Records show that in 1754 it was repaired and improved by its owner at that time, Colonel J. Blackburne. The decoy was part of the estate of Hale Hall, which had been owned by the Ireland Blackburne family since the 1600s. In the 1930s the estate was bought by the Fleetwood-Hesketh family, who still own it, but the decoy was allowed to deteriorate. In 1975 restoration of the site began, and it became a local nature reserve. The lease was taken over by Cheshire County Council, who sub-leased it to the Cheshire and Lancashire Conservation Trusts. The site was cleaned up, a swing bridge was built, and trees were planted. The gamekeeper's hut was rebuilt by volunteers in 1981–82.

In February 1990 the decoy was damaged when it was flooded with salt water caused by the combination of a high tide and a north-westerly gale. Trees and other wildlife were killed. Following this, in June and August the central pond was dredged, and in March 1991 the moat was dredged, placing the mud on its banks to increase their height. The lease of the decoy was taken over by Halton Borough Council in 2000, and it was run by their Ranger service. In 2004 a group of volunteers, the Friends of Pickerings Pasture, was awarded a Heritage Lottery grant to restore the gamekeeper's hut to provide further information facilities for visitors. In 2010 the Council disbanded the Ranger service, and the management of the decoy passed to the Parks and Open Spaces department, supported by the Friends of Pickerings Pasture. In December 2013 there was another high tide coinciding with a north-westerly gate, and it was feared that there would be another serious flood. In the event, although the decoy had been breached, there was only minimal flooding and damage.

== Description ==
The reserve covers an area of 3,084 hectares. The decoy consists of a central pond with five narrowing arms (known as pipes) radiating outward, giving it the shape of a pentagon. Between the pipes is woodland, and the whole area is surrounded by a moat 16 feet wide, which is crossed by a swing bridge. Within the site is the restored gamekeeper's hut. This contains display materials and information brochures. Also in the site, near to the area of the boat house is an inscribed stone. The inscription reads "XRC: 63", and it has been suggested that it is a date stone, giving a date of 1633.

== Today ==
The duck decoy is managed by a group of volunteers called The Friends of Pickerings Pasture and Hale Duck Decoy. The site is a designated Scheduled Ancient Monument. The woodland on the site is subject to a Tree Preservation Order, and the site and salt marsh around it is part of the Mersey Estuary Site of Special Scientific Interest. Guided walks for the general public are organised by arrangement with the Friends of Pickerings Pasture. In November 2018 the site was placed on Historic England's Heritage at Risk list and was described as "neglected".

== See also ==
- List of Scheduled Monuments in Cheshire (post-1539)
