= Winsford railway accident =

There have been three major rail accidents and one notable incident near Winsford in Cheshire:

- 1948 Winsford railway accident - 1948
- Coppenhall Junction railway accident - 1962
- 1965 Winsford railway accident - 1965
- 1999 Winsford railway accident - 1999
