= Boer War Memorial, Winsford =

War memorial in England

Coordinates: 53.19162°N 2.52916°W

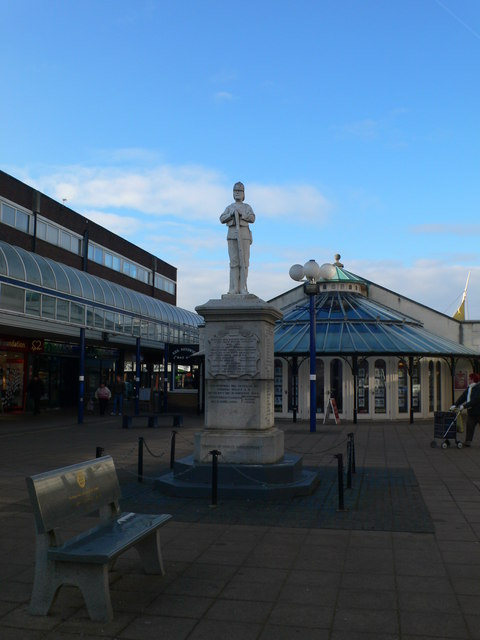
Boer War Memorial, Winsford

The Boer War Memorial stands in the shopping precinct of Winsford, Cheshire, England. It consists of the statue of a soldier in uniform standing on a plinth, and it was unveiled in 1906. It originally stood on a different site in the town and was moved to its present position in the 1960s. In addition to recording the names of those who were lost in the conflict, it also contains the names of those who survived.

== History ==
Following the Boer Wars, a committee was formed to organise a memorial statue. The sum of £125 was raised by a door-to-door collection, with money coming from 700 subscribers. The sculptor was Herbert Chatham of Rhyl, and the memorial was built by G. Hamlett and Sons. It was unveiled on 24 October 1906 by General Ridley, who had served in the war. The memorial was originally sited next to the Brunner Guildhall in High Street, and was moved into the shopping precinct in the 1960s.

== Description ==
The memorial consists of a white marble figure standing on a pedestal made of granite from Kenney in Scotland. The figure is 144 centimetres (4.7 ft) high, and the pedestal is 230 centimetres (7.5 ft) in height. The memorial is in a cobbled area surrounded by a chain fence. At the bottom are two octagonal steps, on which stands a square base and a square pedestal. On top of the pedestal is a cornice on which is the figure of a soldier in the uniform that was worn in the Boer Wars. He stands at ease, with a tree trunk behind his right leg, and is holding a rifle. He also has a satchel, a water flask, strips of bullets, a hip bag, and on his belt is a dagger.

On the east side of the base of the memorial, facing the shopping precinct, is letting in lead that reads:

ERECTED BY PUBLIC SUBSCRIPTION
1906

In a scroll on the east side of the pedestal is a Latin inscription reading:

DULCE ET
DECORUM EST PRO
PATRIA MORI (Note: This is a quotation from the Odes of Horace that translates "To die for the fatherland is sweet and becoming".)

Below the scroll is a cartouche inscribed:

WINSFORD MEN WHO DIED WHILE SERVING
IN THE SOUTH AFRICAN CAMPAIGN
1899–1902

followed by a list of names.

Under the cartouche is an inscription reading:

THIS MEMORIAL WAS UNVEILED BY
GENERAL RIDLEY C.B.
ON THE 24TH DAY OF NOVEMBER 1906
ARTHUR HAMLETT, CHAIRMAN
JNO. H. COOKE, CLERK
WINSFORD
URBAN
DISTRICT
COUNCIL

On the north side of the plinth the inscription reads:

WINSFORD MEN WHO SERVED AS VOLUNTEERS
AND SURVIVED

followed by a list of names.

On the south side of the plinth is the following inscription:

WINSFORD MEN WHO SERVED IN THE REGULAR ARMY
AND SURVIVED

followed by a list of names.

== Appraisal ==
The memorial is recorded in the National Heritage List for England as a Grade II listed building, having been designated on 12 March 1986. Grade II is the lowest of the three grades of listing and is applied to "buildings of national importance and special interest".

== See also ==
- Listed buildings in Winsford

== Notes and references ==
Notes

Citations

Sources

- Morris, Edward; Roberts, Emma (2012), Public Sculpture of Cheshire and Merseyside (excluding Liverpool), Public Sculpture of Britain, vol. 15, Liverpool: Liverpool University Press, ISBN 978-1-84631-492-6
- Historic England, "War Memorial, Winsford (1310406)", National Heritage List for England
- Historic England, Listed Buildings
- National Recording Project, Winsford Boer War Memorial, archived from the original on 1 February 2014
