= Over and Wharton branch line =

The Over and Wharton branch line was a railway line serving the town of Winsford in Cheshire. It was owned and operated by the London and North Western Railway Company (LNWR) from 1882 and then the London Midland and Scottish Railway (LMS) until the railways were nationalised under the Transport Act 1947, which took effect on 1 January 1948. Thereafter the branch was operated by British Railways London Midland Region until the line's closure in March 1991.

== Beginnings ==
The line was an extension and, to some extent, resiting and relaying, of various branches connecting the Grand Junction Railway's (GJR) main line to various salt works and coal wharves around Wharton Common and the east bank of the River Weaver. By 1882, the LNWR had converted and amalgamated these lines into a double track branch line to a new station at Over and Wharton.

== The route ==
The branch left the LNWR's Crewe to Warrington Line at Winsford Junction, a short distance north of Winsford railway station. The line curved sharply westwards then followed a cutting before curving into the terminus, a distance of 1 mile and 22 yards.

== Operation ==
The branch was originally double track but then was worked as a single track line after the First World War. The original up line was not lifted but used as a long siding. This siding was later used for the storage of locomotives bound for the scrap yard. There were no intermediate stations and the only signal box on the line was closed in 1957 when the line was worked under one engine in steam.

== Passenger services ==
Although the LNWR provided passenger facilities at the terminus at Over and Wharton, the main raison d'être of the line was freight: mainly salt and coal. There was a limited passenger service until 16 June 1947 when Over and Wharton station closed. Services ran to a variety of local destinations such as Runcorn, Wigan, Warrington and Acton Bridge but offered poor connections in the main.

== Decline and closure ==
The line remained busy with rock salt trains until 1992 when the line was closed and the track lifted.

== The line today ==
Only a small portion of brickwork from Over and Wharton station remains, the remainder of the branch and station is now the site of a housing development and the A5018 road.
