= St John the Evangelist's Church, Winsford =

Coordinates: 53.1922°N 2.5481°W

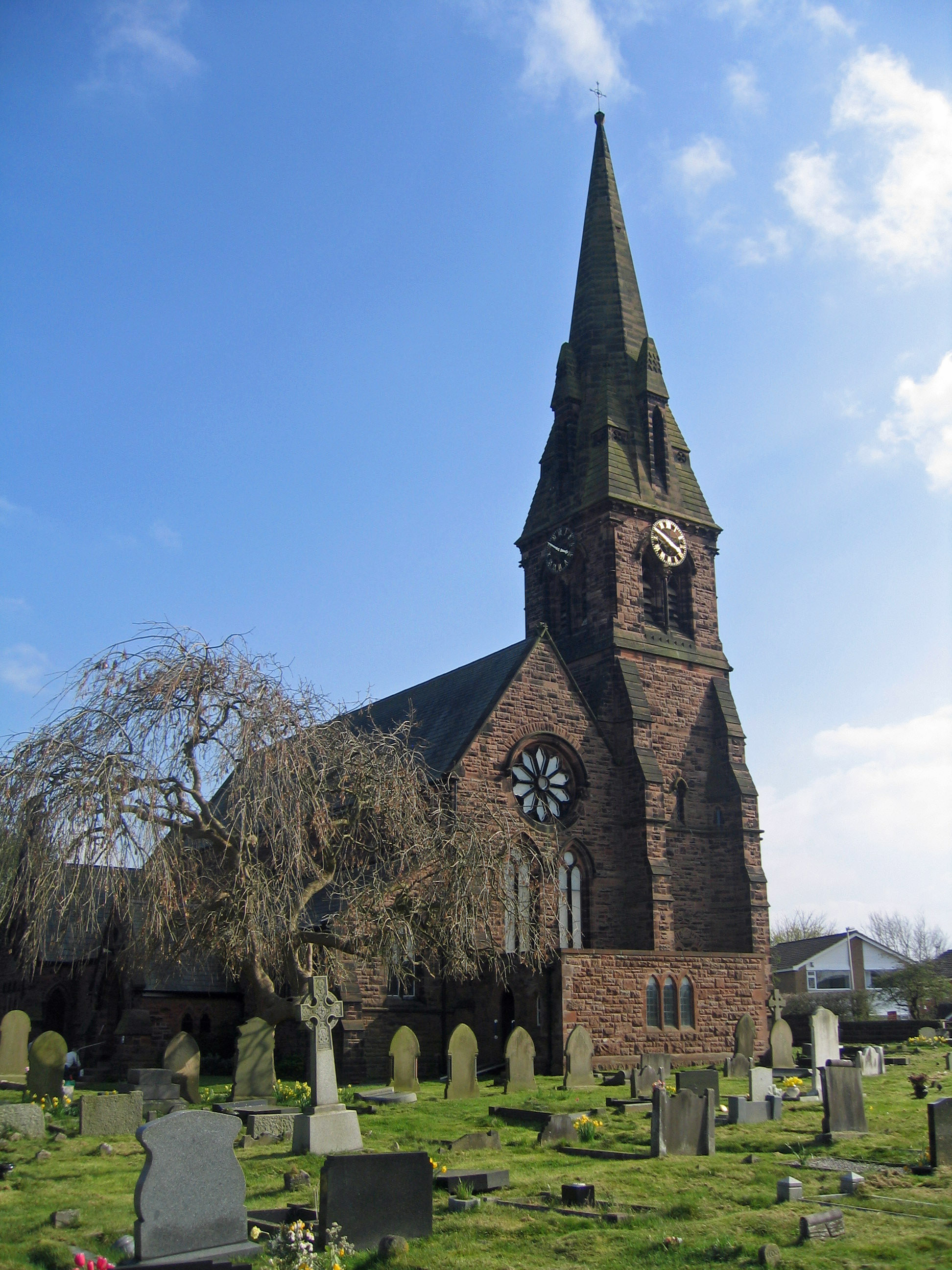
- West end of St John's Church, Winsford

- Location in Cheshire
- OS grid reference: SJ 635 663
- Location: Delamere Street, Over, Winsford, Cheshire
- Country: England
- Denomination: Anglican
- Churchmanship: Conservative Evangelical
- Website: St John, Over

History
- Status: Parish church
- Founder: Hugh Cholmondeley, 2nd Baron Delamere
- Dedication: St John the Evangelist
- Consecrated: June 1863

Architecture
- Functional status: Active
- Heritage designation: Grade II
- Designated: 12 March 1986
- Architect: John Douglas
- Architectural type: Church
- Style: Gothic Revival
- Groundbreaking: 1861
- Completed: 1863
- Construction cost: £5,000

Specifications
- Materials: Sandstone, grey slate roof

Administration
- Province: York
- Diocese: Chester
- Archdeaconry: Chester
- Deanery: Middlewich
- Parish: St John the Evangelist, Over

Clergy
- Vicar: Revd Richard Marshall

St John the Evangelist's Church is in Over, Winsford, Cheshire, England. The church is recorded in the National Heritage List for England as a designated Grade II listed building. It is an active Anglican parish church in the diocese of Chester, the archdeaconry of Chester and the deanery of Middlewich.

== History ==
In 1860 Hugh Cholmondeley, 2nd Baron Delamere, commissioned the Chester architect John Douglas to build a church in the centre of Over, which was then a village separate from Winsford, as a memorial to his wife, Sara. At that time Douglas was at the start of his career and was working for Lord Delamere at his house and estate at Vale Royal Abbey. A new parish of St John the Evangelist was created out of the parishes of St Mary, Whitegate and St Chad, Over. The church was consecrated by John Graham, Bishop of Chester in June 1863. This was the first church designed by John Douglas.

In 1961 a new choir vestry was formed to celebrate the 100th anniversary of the church. A Lady Chapel was dedicated in 1972 with an aumbry added the following year. Outside porch doors were fitted in 1979.

== Architecture ==
The church is built in Runcorn sandstone with a grey slate roof. It is in Decorated style. Its plan consists of a five-bay nave with a clerestory, north and south aisles, a chancel, a tower at the southwest corner, and a vestry at the northeast. The tower is in three stages with a spire and angle buttresses. In the third stage of the tower are two-light bell openings and clock faces on three sides. There is no clock face on the south side because when the church was built there were only fields on that side. The spire is 140 feet (43 m) high. On the spire are lucarnes, and at the top is a wrought iron cross. A chimney stack rises from the gable of the vestry. Internally there is stone panelling at the east end with an alabaster model of the Last Supper.

== External features ==
In the churchyard there are many memorials; these include one to those who died in a cotton mill fire in Over in 1874. This memorial is constructed in yellow sandstone ashlar and carries inscriptions, including a quotation from St Mark's Gospel, and the names of the four victims which include a baby aged three months. It is listed at Grade II.

== Present day ==
Today the church is very active and has regular services on Sundays. It holds baptisms, marriages and funerals and other occasional events. It is very involved in the community of Winsford.

St John's is within the Conservative Evangelical tradition of the Church of England, and it has passed resolutions to reject the ordination of women.

== See also ==
- Listed buildings in Winsford
- List of new churches by John Douglas
