= Over and Wharton railway station =

Former railway station in England

Over and Wharton

General information
- Location: Winsford, Cheshire West and Chester; England
- Coordinates: 53.1940°N 2.5145°W
- Platforms: 1

Other information
- Status: Disused

History
- Original company: London and North Western Railway
- Post-grouping: London Midland and Scottish Railway

Key dates
- 3 July 1882: Opened
- 1 January 1917: closed
- 17 July 1920: reopened
- 16 June 1947: Closed to passengers
- March 1991: Closed completely
Location

Over and Wharton railway station was one of three railway stations serving the town of Winsford in Cheshire. The station was the terminus of the Over and Wharton branch line, a short branch off the West Coast Main Line operated by the London and North Western Railway and later the London Midland and Scottish Railway and British Railways.

== Decline and closure ==
The passenger service, which was always meagre and in general did not offer good connections with other services, was eventually withdrawn and the station closed to passengers on 16 June 1947. Goods traffic survived nationalisation and the station remained open for mainly rock salt traffic until March 1991

== Route ==
Preceding station	Disused railways	Following station
Terminus	London and North Western Railway; Over and Wharton branch line	Hartford

== See also ==
- Winsford railway station
- Winsford and Over railway station
