= 1965 Winsford railway accident =

Railway incident in England

Coordinates: 53.191°N 2.495°W

1965 Winsford blowback

Details
- Date: 5 June 1965
- Location: Winsford railway station
- Operator: London Midland Region of British Railways
- Incident type: Fire blowback

Statistics
- Trains: 1
- Crew: 2
- Deaths: 1
- Injured: 1 (serious)

On 5 June 1965, British Rail Standard Class 7 locomotive 70051 Firth of Forth was hauling a passenger train when a blowback of the fire occurred near Winsford, severely injuring both traincrew. Driver Wallace Oakes managed to safely bring the train to a stand, but both he and fireman Gwilym Roberts were severely injured. Oakes died a week later. He was awarded the George Cross and the Carnegie Hero Trust bronze medal for his actions. Class 86 locomotive 86 260 was later named Wallace Oakes G.C. in his honour.
