= Over United Reformed Church =

Coordinates: 53.1884°N 2.5399°W

- Over United Reformed Church

- Location in Cheshire
- OS grid reference: SJ640658
- Location: Swanlow Lane, Over, Winsford, Cheshire
- Country: England
- Denomination: United Reformed
- Previous denomination: Congregational

History
- Former name: Over Congregational Chapel
- Founded: 1865

Architecture
- Functional status: Active
- Heritage designation: Grade II
- Designated: 12 March 1986
- Architect: John Douglas
- Architectural type: Church
- Groundbreaking: 1865
- Completed: 1867

Specifications
- Materials: Polychromatic brick with red sandstone dressings; slate roof

Over United Reformed Church is in Swanlow Lane, Over, Winsford, Cheshire, England. It was built as a Congregational chapel and is now a United Reformed Church. It is a Grade II listed building,

The church was the second to be designed by John Douglas. Building began in 1865 and was completed in 1867. Its exterior is in polychromatic brick, with a slate roof and red sandstone dressings.

It is an unusual building that Douglas' biographer Edward Hubbard describes as being "experimental" and as presenting "an astonishing sight". The architectural historian Nikolaus Pevsner called it "very ugly".

== See also ==
- List of new churches by John Douglas
- Listed buildings in Winsford
