= Winsford =

Town in Cheshire, England

Coordinates: 53.194°N 2.520°W

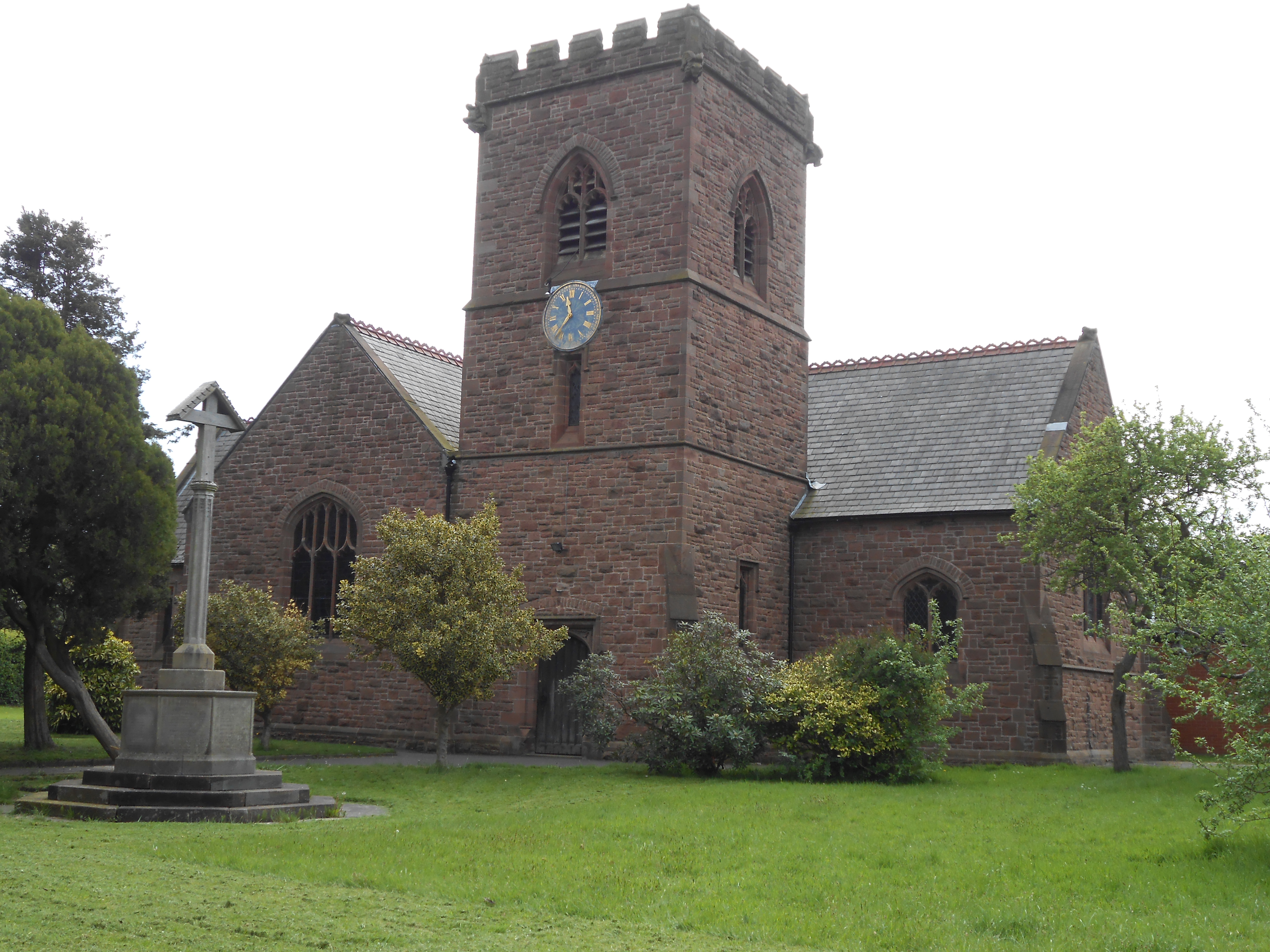
- Christ Church, Wharton, Winsford

- Location within Cheshire
- Interactive map of Winsford
- Population: 33,547 (Parish, 2021); 32,530 (Built up area, 2021)
- OS grid reference: SJ6566
  - London: 155 mi (249 km) SE
- Civil parish: Winsford
- Unitary authority: Cheshire West and Chester
- Ceremonial county: Cheshire
- Region: North West
- Country: England
- Sovereign state: United Kingdom
- Post town: WINSFORD
- Postcode district: CW7
- Dialling code: 01606 (Northwich/Winsford), 01829 (Tarporley)
- Police: Cheshire
- Fire: Cheshire
- Ambulance: North West
- UK Parliament: Mid Cheshire
- Website: www.winsford.gov.uk

Winsford is a town and civil parish in the unitary authority of Cheshire West and Chester and the ceremonial county of Cheshire, England. It is on the River Weaver, south of Northwich and west of Middlewich. It grew around the salt mining industry after the river was canalised in the 18th century, allowing freight to be conveyed northwards to the Port of Runcorn on the River Mersey. At the 2021 census the built up area had a population of 32,530 and the parish had a population of 33,547.

Winsford is home to many minor settlements including: Over, Wharton, Swanlow, Dene, Darnhall, Salterswall, Stanthorne, Glebe Green, Ways Green, Winsford Industrial Estate, Whitegate, Marton, Niddries (Southern Moulton), Gravel and Hebden Green.

== History ==
=== Early origins ===
The name Winsford is of uncertain origin, but is thought to derive from a personal name Wain or Wynne and ford, referencing a crossing point of the River Weaver.

The Norman Earls of Chester had a hunting lodge or summer palace at Darnhall in Over parish. There was an enclosed area where deer and wild boar were kept to be hunted by the Earl and his guests. King Henry III annexed the title and its lands, spending time at Darnhall. In 1270 at the behest of his son, Henry III gave the estate to the Cistercians, who built Darnhall Abbey in 1274. However, the land was not suitable for the grand scale of building envisaged, and the locals were not co-operative, so the monks left Darnhall to found Vale Royal Abbey in Whitegate in 1281.

A charter to hold a Wednesday market and an annual fair at Over was granted on 24 November 1280 by Edward I to the Abbot and convent of Vale Royal Abbey. From this charter can be traced the origins of the market that is still held in the town.

=== Expansion ===
Winsford began to significantly expand after 1721, when Parliament gave permission for locks and other improvements on the River Weaver to go ahead which allowed sea-going vessels to reach Winsford from the port of Liverpool. At first, this was the closest that barges carrying china clay from Cornwall could get to the Potteries district of north Staffordshire. Locally produced salt was also transported to the Potteries, for use in the manufacture of salt-glazed stoneware. Finished ceramics from the Potteries were brought back to Winsford, for export through the Port of Liverpool. That trade ended in the 1780s when the Trent and Mersey Canal opened and carried the goods through Middlewich, bypassing Winsford. The canalised River Weaver was the inspiration for the Duke of Bridgewater's canals and later the engineer for the Weaver Navigation, Edwin Leader Williams, designed and built the Manchester Ship Canal.

Railways came relatively early to Winsford, with the opening of Winsford station on the Grand Junction Railway in 1837. In his guide to the line, published that year, Arthur Freeling wrote: "There is so little worth attention in this village, that it is not even noticed in Parliamentary Population Returns."

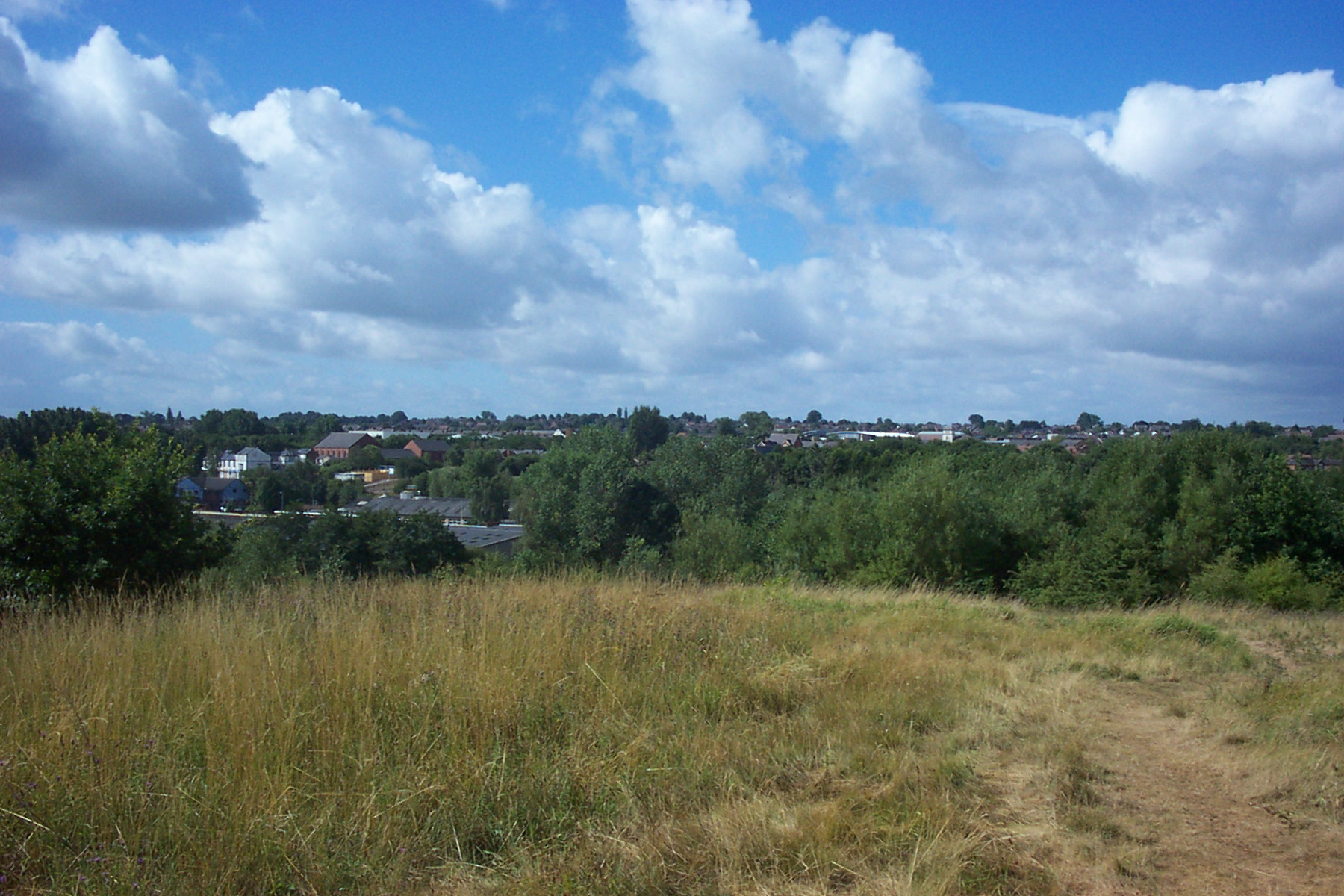
Winsford, as seen from Weaver Valley Park in Wharton

From the 1830s, salt became important to Winsford, partly because the salt mines under Northwich had begun to collapse and another source of salt near the River Weaver was needed. A new source was discovered in Winsford, leading to the development of a salt industry along the course of the River Weaver, where many factories were established. As a result, a new town developed within 1 mi (2 km) of the old Borough of Over which had been focused on Delamere Street. Most of the early development took place on the other side of the river, with new housing, shops, pubs, chapels and a new church being built in the former hamlet of Wharton. Many of the buildings built in the 19th century were built using timber frame construction because of the risk of salt subsidence.

Winsford Urban District Council came into being in 1894, administering the areas of Over and Wharton.

=== 20th century ===
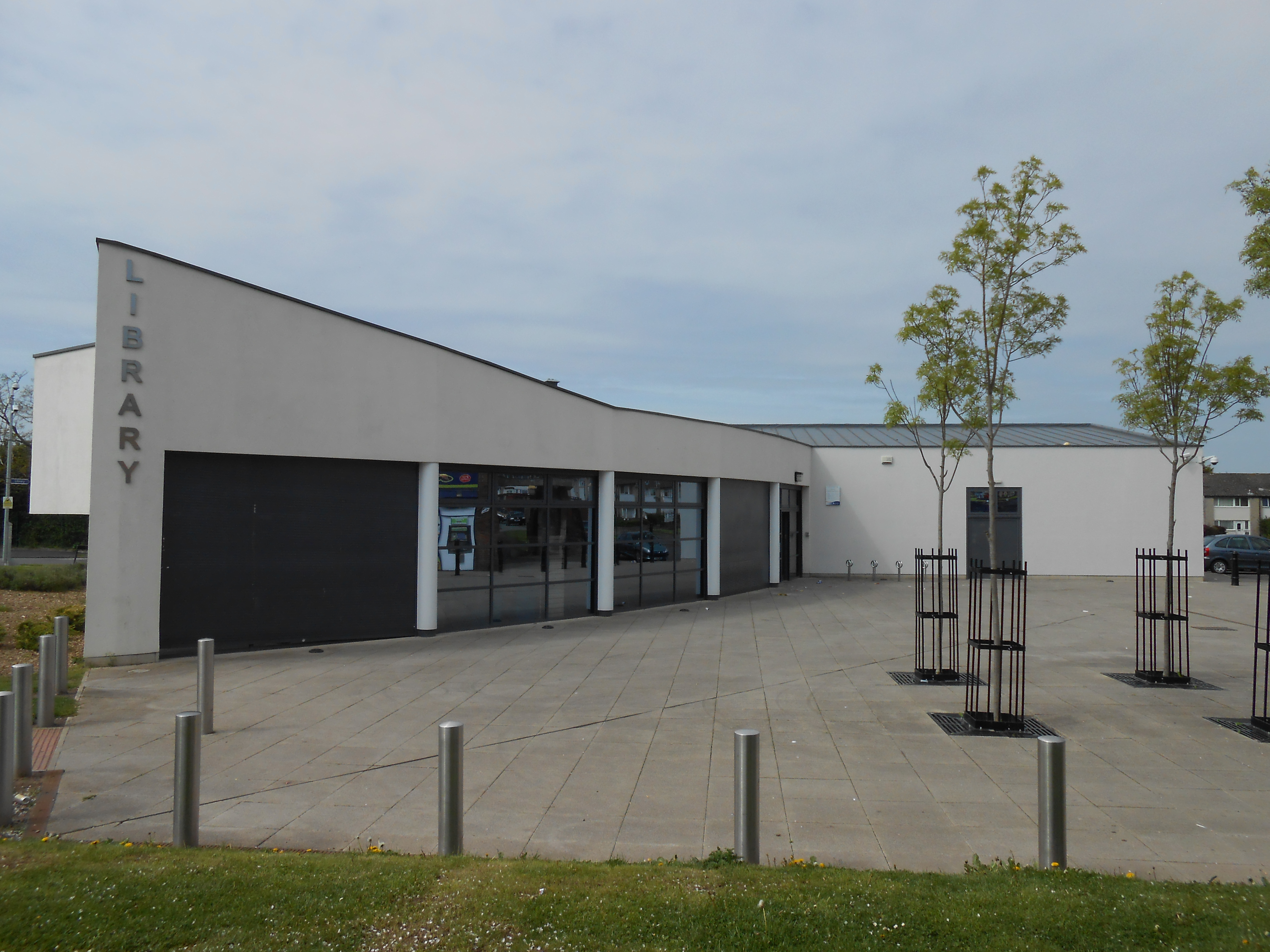
Winsford Library

By the Second World War, employment in the salt trade had declined as one company took control of all the salt works and introduced methods of manufacture that needed much less labour. Slum clearance started in the 1930s and, by the 1950s three new housing estates had been built on both sides of the river to replace sub-standard homes. However, even in the 1960s, Winsford could be described as "one long line of mainly terraced houses from the station to Salterswall."

The town experienced a major expansion in the late 1960s and 1970s, with its designation as an expanded town under the Town Development Act 1952 to take excess 'overspill' population from Liverpool. This saw the development of two new industrial areas on both sides of the town, new estates of council and private housing and a new shopping centre with a library, sports centre, civic hall and doctors' surgeries. However, the town's population did not grow as much as planned, so the new civic buildings were too large for the population.

Vale Royal Borough Council was formed in 1974, covering Winsford, Northwich and a large rural area of mid-Cheshire. In 1991, the council moved its main office from Northwich to a purpose-built headquarters in Winsford, which since April 2009 has been used by its successor authority Cheshire West and Chester Council. The same building also houses Winsford Town Council. Since then, both Cheshire Fire Service (in 1997) and Cheshire Police (in 2003) have moved headquarters from the county town of Chester to Winsford.

== Governance ==
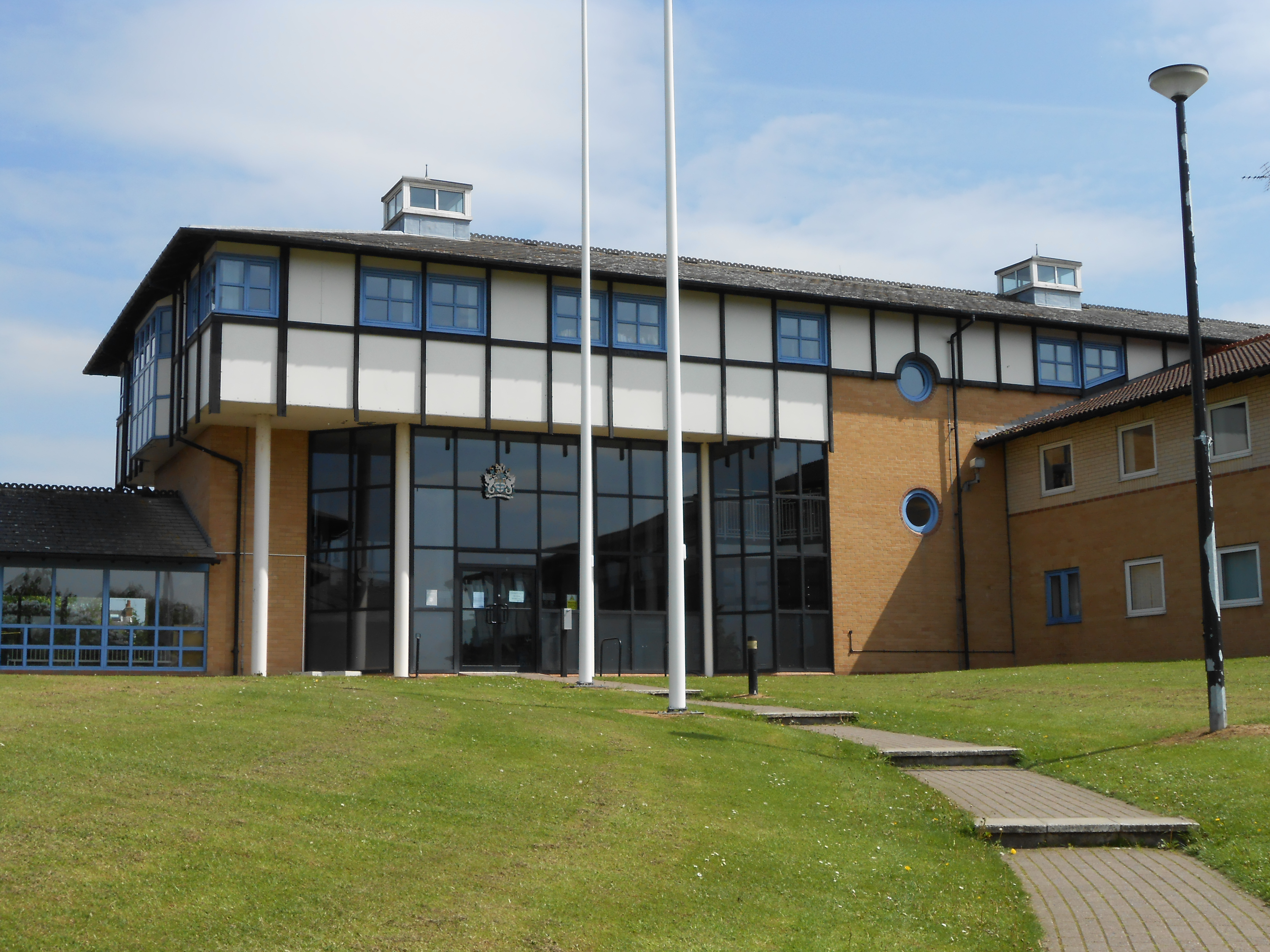
Wyvern House, The Drumber

There are two tiers of local government covering Winsford, at civil parish (town) and unitary authority level: Winsford Town Council and Cheshire West and Chester Council. Both councils have offices at Wyvern House on The Drumber. For national elections, Winsford is part of the Mid Cheshire constituency.

=== Administrative history ===
The settlement of Winsford historically straddled two townships. The part east of the River Weaver was in the Wharton township, which formed part of the parish of Davenham. The part west of the River Weaver was in the Over township and parish. In 1875, a local government district called Winsford was created, administered by an elected local board. The district covered the combined area of the Over and Wharton townships. Such districts were reconstituted as urban districts under the Local Government Act 1894. In 1936, the civil parishes within the district were also united into a single parish of Winsford matching the urban district, and there were various adjustments to the boundaries with neighbouring parishes.

Winsford Urban District was abolished in 1974 under the Local Government Act 1972. The area became part of the new district (borough after 1988) of Vale Royal. A successor parish called Winsford covering the area of the former urban district was created, with its parish council taking the name Winsford Town Council.

In 2009, Cheshire West and Chester Council was created, taking over the functions of the borough council and Cheshire County Council, which were both abolished.

== Geography ==
Winsford

Climate chart (precipitation, max. and min. temperature)
J	F	M	A	M	J	J	A	S	O	N	D
69 6 1	50 7 1	60 9 3	50 12 4	60 15 7	66 18 10	66 20 12	79 20 12	74 17 10	76 14 8	79 9 4	79 7 2
- █ Average max. and min. temperatures in °C
- █ Precipitation totals in mm
- Source: "Records and averages". Yahoo! Weather.
Imperial conversion
J	F	M	A	M	J	J	A	S	O	N	D
2.7 43 34	2 45 34	2.4 48 37	2 54 39	2.4 59 45	2.6 64 50	2.6 68 54	3.1 68 54	2.9 63 50	3 57 46	3.1 48 39	3.1 45 36
- █ Average max. and min. temperatures in °F
- █ Precipitation totals in inches

A small area in the south of the civil parish falls within the Weaver Valley Area of Special County Value.

=== Weather ===
Winsford's climate is temperate with few extremes. The average temperature is slightly above the average for the United Kingdom, as is the average amount of sunshine. The average annual rainfall is slightly below the average for the United Kingdom. On an annual basis, there are few days when snow lies on the ground, although there are some days of air frost.

== Economy ==
=== Rock salt ===
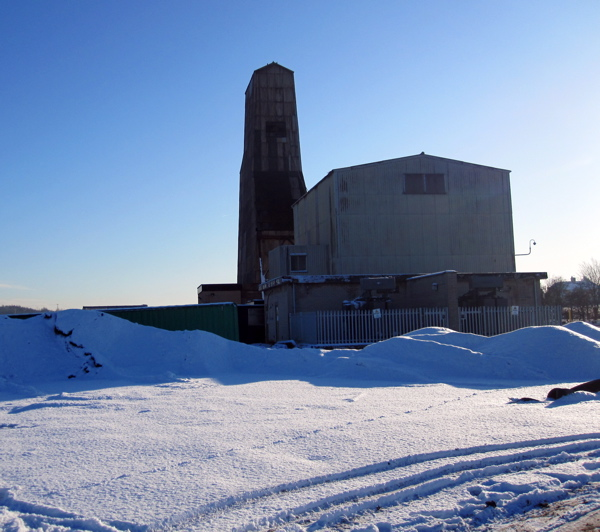
Winsford Rock Salt Mine, January 2010

The United Kingdom's largest rock salt (halite) mine is in Winsford. It is one of only three places where rock salt is commercially mined in the United Kingdom; the others are at Boulby Mine, North Yorkshire, and Kilroot, near Carrickfergus, Northern Ireland.

Rock salt was laid down in this part of North West England 220 million years ago, during the Triassic geological period. Sea water moved inland from an open sea, creating a chain of shallow salt lakes across what is today the Cheshire Basin. As the lakes evaporated, deep deposits of rock salt were formed.

Extraction began at Winsford in the 17th century. At first it was used only as salt licks for animals, and to strengthen weak brine. In 1844, Winsford Rock Salt Mine was opened and is claimed by its operator, Salt Union Ltd., to be "Britain's oldest working mine". Salt Union Ltd. is part of the US-owned group of companies Compass Minerals. Today, rock salt is quarried from a depth of more than 150 metres, producing salt (commonly known as grit) for use as a de-icing agent on roads. The mine produces one million tonnes of rock salt annually and has a network of over 160 mi (260 km) of tunnels over several square miles underneath the area between Winsford and Northwich.

A worked-out part of the mine is operated by DeepStore Ltd., a records management company offering a secure storage facility. Confidential government files, hospital patient records, historic archives belonging to The National Archives and business data are stored in the mine, where the dry and stable atmosphere provides ideal conditions for long-term document storage.

=== Retail ===
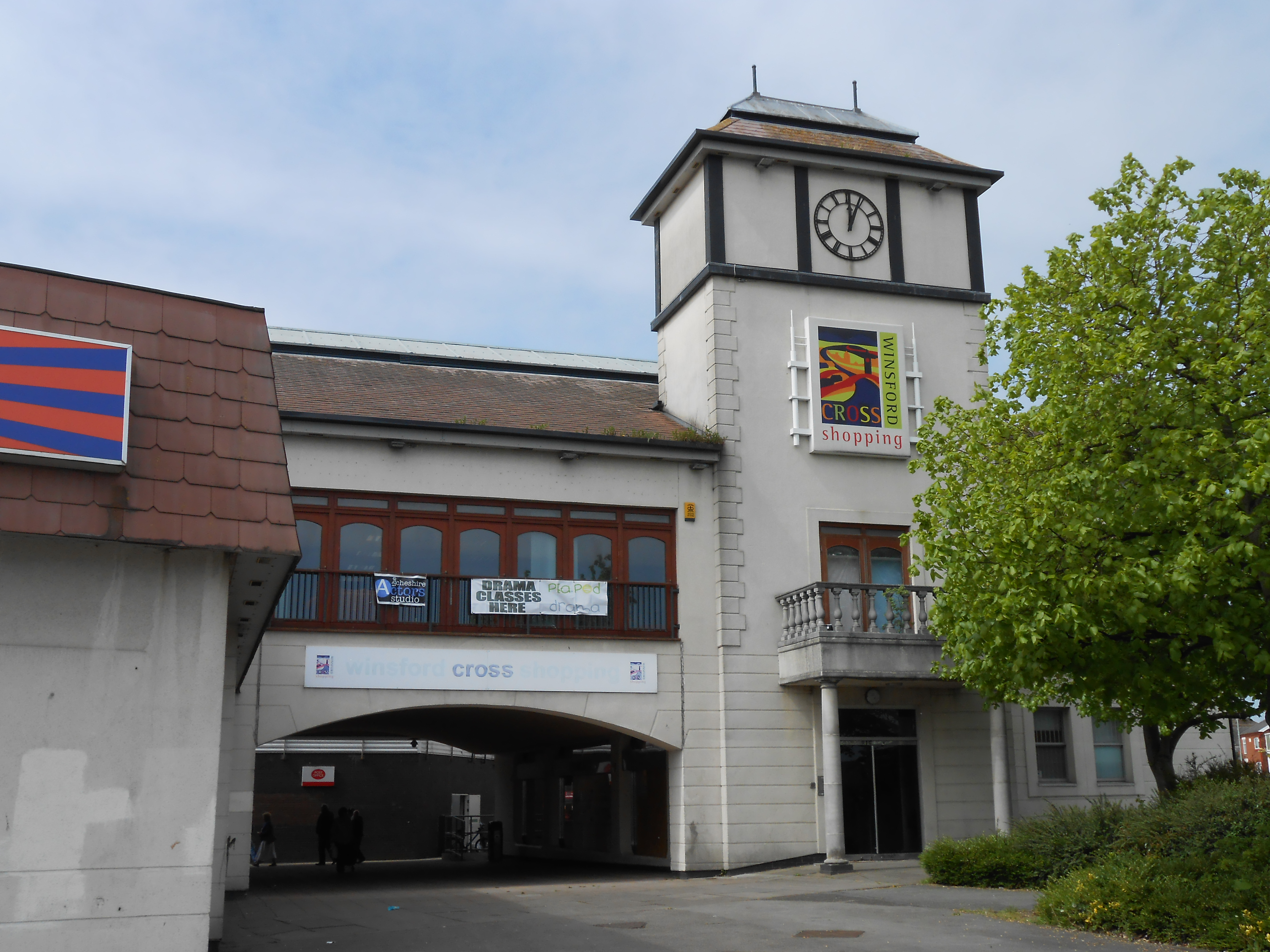
Winsford Cross shopping centre

Supermarkets Asda, Aldi, FarmFoods and B & M are sited in the town centre, Morrisons, Home Bargains and Co-op are in Wharton and Tesco, Premier and Heron Foods is in Over. There are branches of various national chain stores. The shopping centre is a 1970s design, with retail units and a multi-storey car park subsequently added. In 2018, Winsford Cross Shopping Centre was bought by Cheshire West and Chester Council.

=== Infrastructure ===
BT have a large employment base in the town. The Winsford telephone exchange is a main handover point and provides fibre broadband services to Winsford, Moulton, Whitegate, Tarporley, Middlewich, Sandbach, Holmes Chapel, Lower Withington and Sandiway. It also provides the main critical national infrastructure circuits to Cheshire Constabulary HQ, plus hospitals in Leighton, Macclesfield, Chester, Warrington and Halton, as well as numerous telephone masts, schools and doctors' surgeries across Cheshire.

The National Grid also have a main transmission station on Winsford Industrial Estate, which provides power to approximately 25,000 homes across the Winsford and Middlewich area.

An aqueduct maintained by United Utilities runs from Lake Vyrnwy, near Oswestry, to the outskirts of Winsford, where a large pumping station on Woodford Lane West provides water to Winsford, Middlewich and southern Northwich.

== Landmarks ==
=== St Chad's Church ===
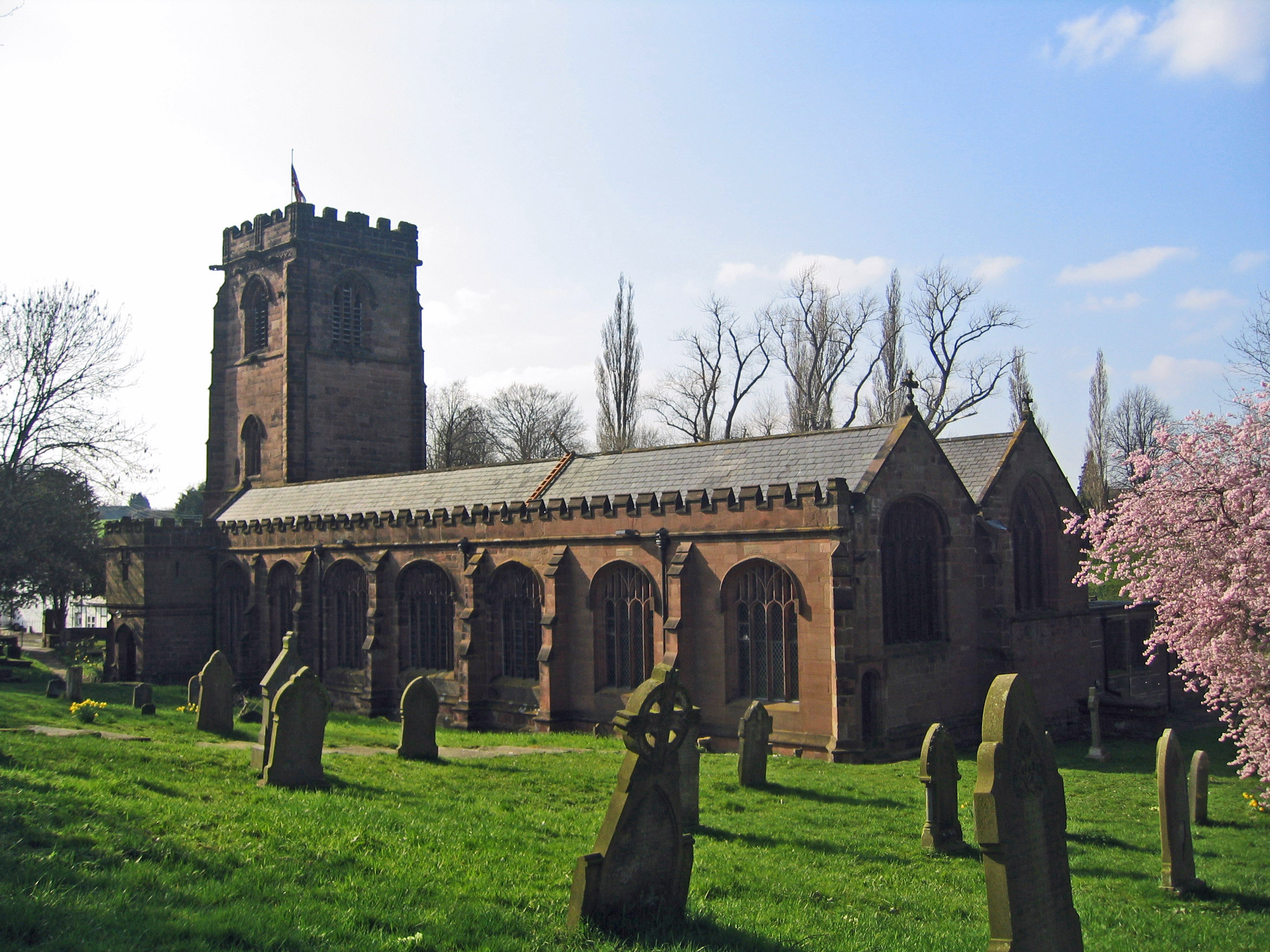
St Chad's Church

St Chad's Church, off Swanlow Lane, is the most well-known local historical landmark. One of the most popular local stories is that it was built in Over Square, but the devil was so angry at the people's use of it that he decided to fly off with it. The monks at Vale Royal Abbey were said to have seen him and rung the abbey bells so that it was dropped at its current location. In fact, its location is probably due to it having always belonged, along with its tithes, to St Mary's Convent in Chester.

The church is a designated Grade II* listed building

=== Stone (or 'Saxon') Cross ===
By St John's Church of England Primary School, on Delamere Street, is a rare (possibly unique) lock-up/monument built in the 19th century. The building is in the form of a stepped pyramid surmounted by a cross. The door to the lock-up is still visible, but was blocked up in the 1970s.

Many fictional tales of buried treasure and secret passages are told about the cross. The nearby street name of Saxon Crossway was invented by the Borough Council in the 1960s. The real Saxon cross is preserved at St Chad's Church.

=== Winsford Flashes ===
The Winsford Flashes are the town's most notable geographical feature. In referring to them as the Cheshire Broads, a comparison is made with the better-known Norfolk Broads. "Flash" is an English dialect word for "lake", with a regional distribution centred on the north-west counties of Cheshire and Lancashire.

The Winsford Flashes (Top Flash, Middle Flash and Bottom Flash, the largest) are three lakes along the course of the River Weaver, extending over some 200 acres (80 hectares). They formed in the 19th century (cartographical evidence dates their formation to between 1845 and 1872), due to the subsidence of surface ground into underground voids. The voids were largely the result of brine extraction, in which rock salt deposits were dissolved and washed out by water. As the ground slumped into the voids, the River Weaver widened at each point, until lakes were made where arable land had once been. From the late 19th century, Winsford Flashes became popular with working class day-trippers from the nearby industrial centres of Manchester and the Staffordshire Potteries. Visitors came in large numbers for a day's leisure boating, picknicking and sightseeing.

However, the Winsford Flashes were never developed as a public amenity and their popularity soon fell into decline. Today, they are primarily enjoyed by the local community and are used for sailing (Winsford Flash Sailing Club is based on the 90 acre (35 hectare) Bottom Flash), fishing and walking. They support a wide range of wildlife, with several species of migrant wildfowl, such as Canada geese, using them as a winter destination.

=== Other landmarks ===
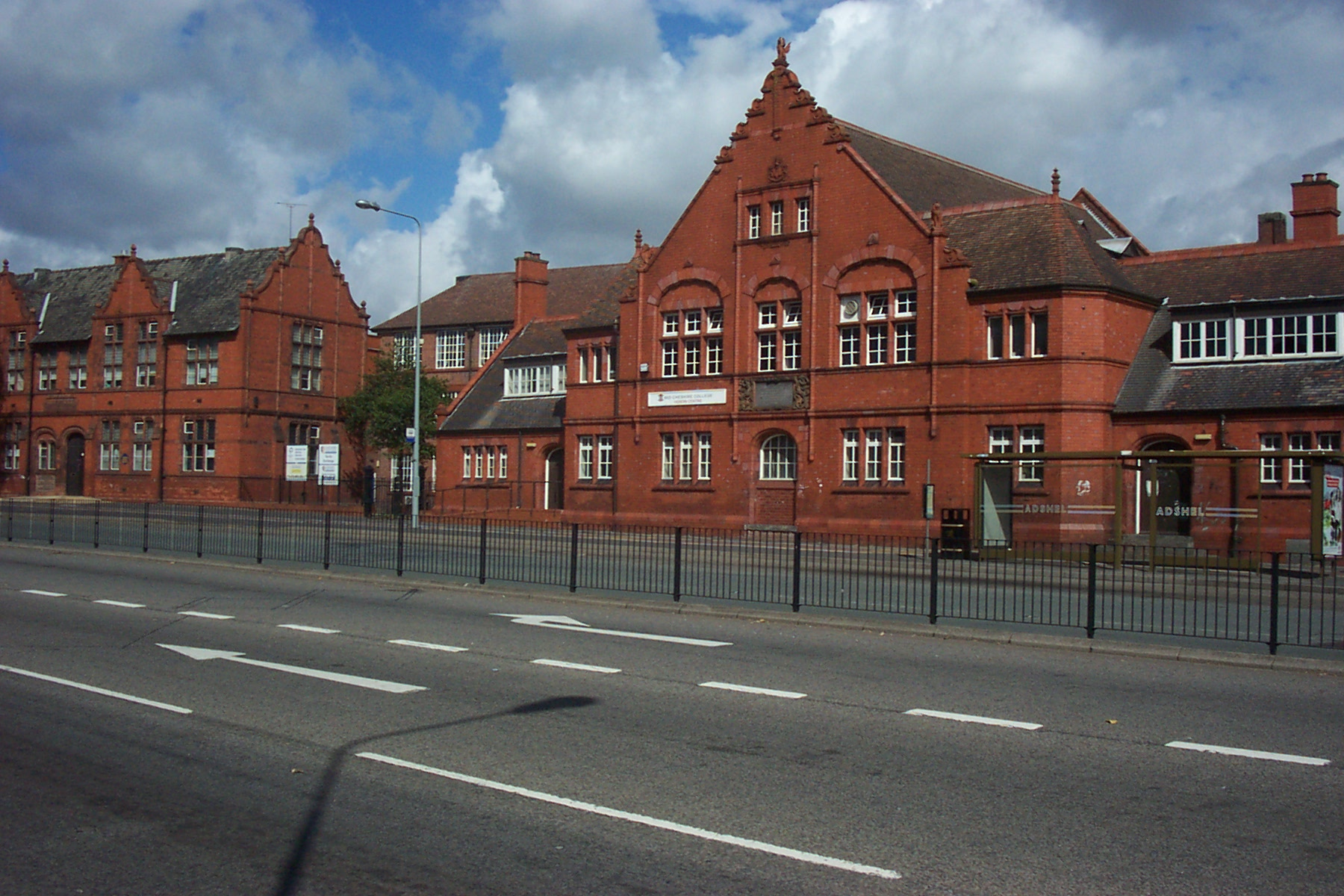
Brunner Guildhall, as seen from across the High Street

St John's Church, on Delamere Street, dates from 1863 when Lord Delamere of Vale Royal commissioned the young Sandiway architect John Douglas to build it as a memorial to his deceased wife. This is the tallest building on the highest part of Over, so the spire can be seen for miles around.

The Brunner Guildhall, which now houses the Citizens Advice Bureau, was built in the late 19th century. It is a two-storey building built in Flemish Gothic style and carries the date 1899. It was built by Sir John Tomlinson Brunner, who gave it to Winsford Urban District Council, to be used for Trade and Friendly Societies and other public purposes. It was given its name by the chairman of the council in recognition of Brunner's generosity.

Parts of the Knights Grange pub, Grange Lane, which was once a farmhouse and belonged to Vale Royal Abbey, were built in the 17th century.

Littler Grange, now a children's nursery, is the best remaining half-timber building in Winsford, including sloping floors on part of the first floor. Dawk House, on Swanlow Lane, is a largely unaltered timber-framed farmhouse, covered in white stucco probably during the reign of Queen Anne, including the date 1711. Blue Bell Inn, by St Chad's Church, is also a children's nursery; it is an exact replica of a medieval building that burned down in the 1960s.

== Transport ==
Winsford railway station is a stop on the West Coast Main Line; it is one mile (1.5 km) east of the centre of the town, in Wharton. London Northwestern Railway operates services between Liverpool Lime Street and Crewe. At one time, the town had two other railway stations: Winsford and Over, on a branch from the Mid-Cheshire Line near Cuddington, and Over and Wharton, on the Over and Wharton branch line. Winsford was the location of a fatal railway accident in 1948 and a further, non-fatal, accident in 1999.

The town is served predominately by two bus routes connecting Crewe and Northwich; the 31 and 37 are operated by D&G Bus. The W7 connects many parts of the town with Over, operated by Stagecoach Merseyside.

The M6 motorway at junction 18 at Middlewich is the nearest motorway link, connected to the town by the A54. Other major roads include the A533, B5074, A5018, B5355 and Road 1 in the Industrial Estate.

The nearest airports are Liverpool John Lennon Airport and Manchester Airport.

== Education ==
Fourteen schools in Winsford work together as part of the Winsford Education Partnership where they share resources and co-ordinate planning.

=== Primary schools ===
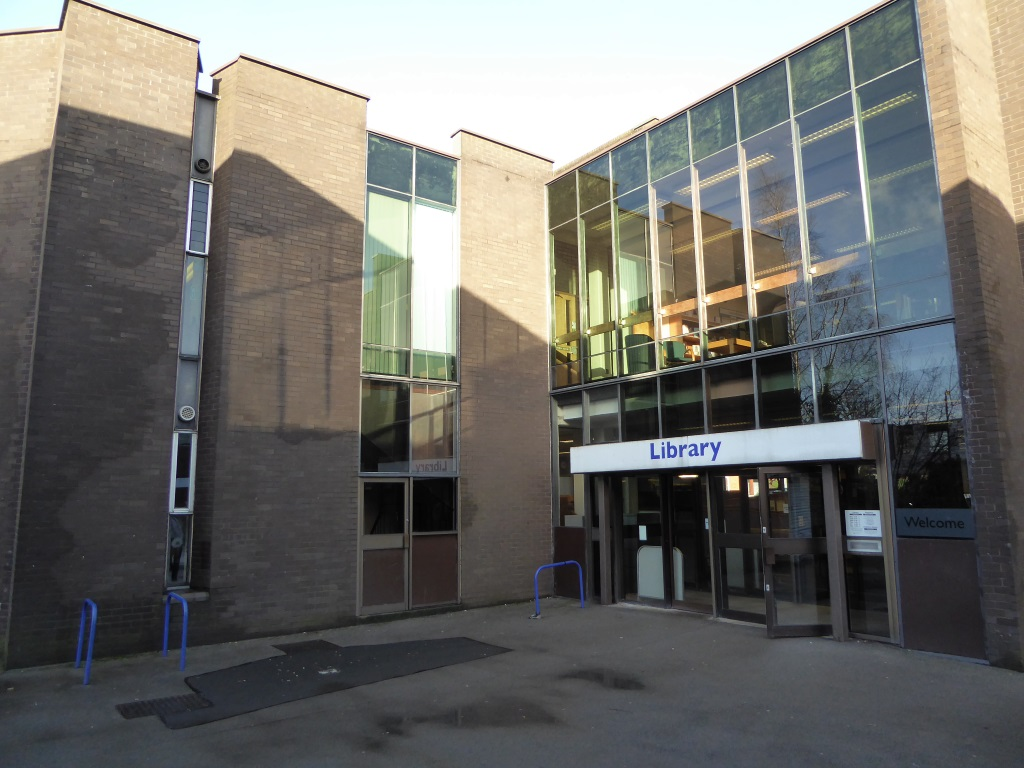
Winsford Library

- Darnhall Primary School
- Grange Primary School
- Oak View Academy
- Winsford High Street Community Primary School
- Overhall Primary School
- St. Chad's C of E Primary School
- St. Joseph's Roman Catholic Primary School
- Wharton CofE Infant and Junior School
- Willow Wood Community Primary School
- Over St Johns CofE Primary School

=== Secondary schools ===
- The Winsford Academy; established via the amalgamation of Verdin High School and Woodford Lodge High School in September 2010
- Hebden Green Community School
- Oaklands School

=== Colleges ===
- Warrington and Vale Royal College

== Religious sites ==
All the following churches in Winsford are members of the Winsford Churches Together, which includes:

- Christ Church, Wharton, Crook Lane
- St Andrew's Methodist Church, Dingle Lane
- St Chad's Church, Over, off Swanlow Lane
- St John the Evangelist's Church, Winsford, Delamere Street
- St Joseph's Catholic Church, Woodford Lane
- The Salvation Army, Weaver Street
- Trinity Methodist Church, Station Road
- Over United Reformed Church, Over Square, Swanlow Lane
- River of Life Church, Queens Parade
- Living Waters Christian Fellowship, Dingle Centre and Queen's Parade.

== Sport and recreation ==
The town has 2 non-league football teams, Winsford Town F.C. & Winsford United.

In March 2019, Winsford was chosen for the site of the £70m Cheshire FA Centre of Excellence, which would have been the new home of the England Women's Football Team. It was also planned to act as a training base for European teams playing in Liverpool and Manchester. The development was delayed by the COVID-19 pandemic in April 2020. In October 2020, the Prime Minister Boris Johnson gave his support for the development to go ahead. The plan was scrapped in 2024.

Winsford ASC is a swimming club which has achieved Swim21 club status and won the North West Division 1 Speedo league. It has now been promoted to the premier league.

Vale Royal Athletic Club is based mainly in Northwich and Winsford, with several international athletes training with them. This club was created in its present form by the merger, in 1994, of the Mid Cheshire Athletic Club and Winsford Athletic Club.

The youth football teams are Winsford United Youth and Winsford Town. Winsford Town were formerly Winsford Diamonds and Winsford Colts, who merged in 2022.

Winsford Cricket Club play in the Meller Braggins Cheshire Cricket League, which forms part of the Cheshire pyramid. Winsford have had a cricket team since 1888 when the team was founded by ICI workers and played at the Dingle, next to the Palace Picture House (now Palace Bingo). In 1991, Winsford moved to Knights Grange to allow the Council to build their new offices (Wyvern House).

Allotment gardens at Moss Bank in Over date from 1924, when William Stubbs of 'Leahlands', Swanlow Lane, sold a 4-acre (16,000 m^{2}) field behind High Street to Winsford Urban District Council, "for the purpose of the Allotments Act". The field, named on the 1846 Over Parish Tithe Map as Well Field, had been farmed since at least the 17th century and its conversion to allotments secured its use for future generations. The site shrank in the 1960s and 1970s, with the building of housing and an electricity sub-station along Moss Bank, but the acquisition in 1970 of land adjacent to Over Recreation Ground brought it to its present size.

In the late 1980s, a record-breaking pumpkin was grown on the allotments. Weighing in at 579 lb (263 kg), it held the national record for a time.

The allotments, about 50 plots and 5 raised beds, are owned and managed by Winsford Town Council. The plot-holders have their own organisation, Over Allotments and Leisure Gardeners' Association. Lottery funding has enabled a programme of ongoing improvements since 2002; the most recent grant being in 2007 from the Awards for All scheme for £6,940.

Winsford Flash Sailing Club is situated on Bottom Flash, the largest of the town's three flashes. The club was founded as Northwich Sailing Club in 1931 and moved to Winsford in 1934. The club has won the Southport 24 Hour Race twice and double Paralympic medalist Niki Birrell sailed there in his youth.

The Brighton Belle pub was known as the Railway Inn until 1972, when a Pullman carriage from the Brighton Belle train was added to function as a restaurant. Over the next 26 years, the carriage became a local landmark until it was removed in 1998 because the cost of refurbishment in situ was prohibitive.

== Notable people ==
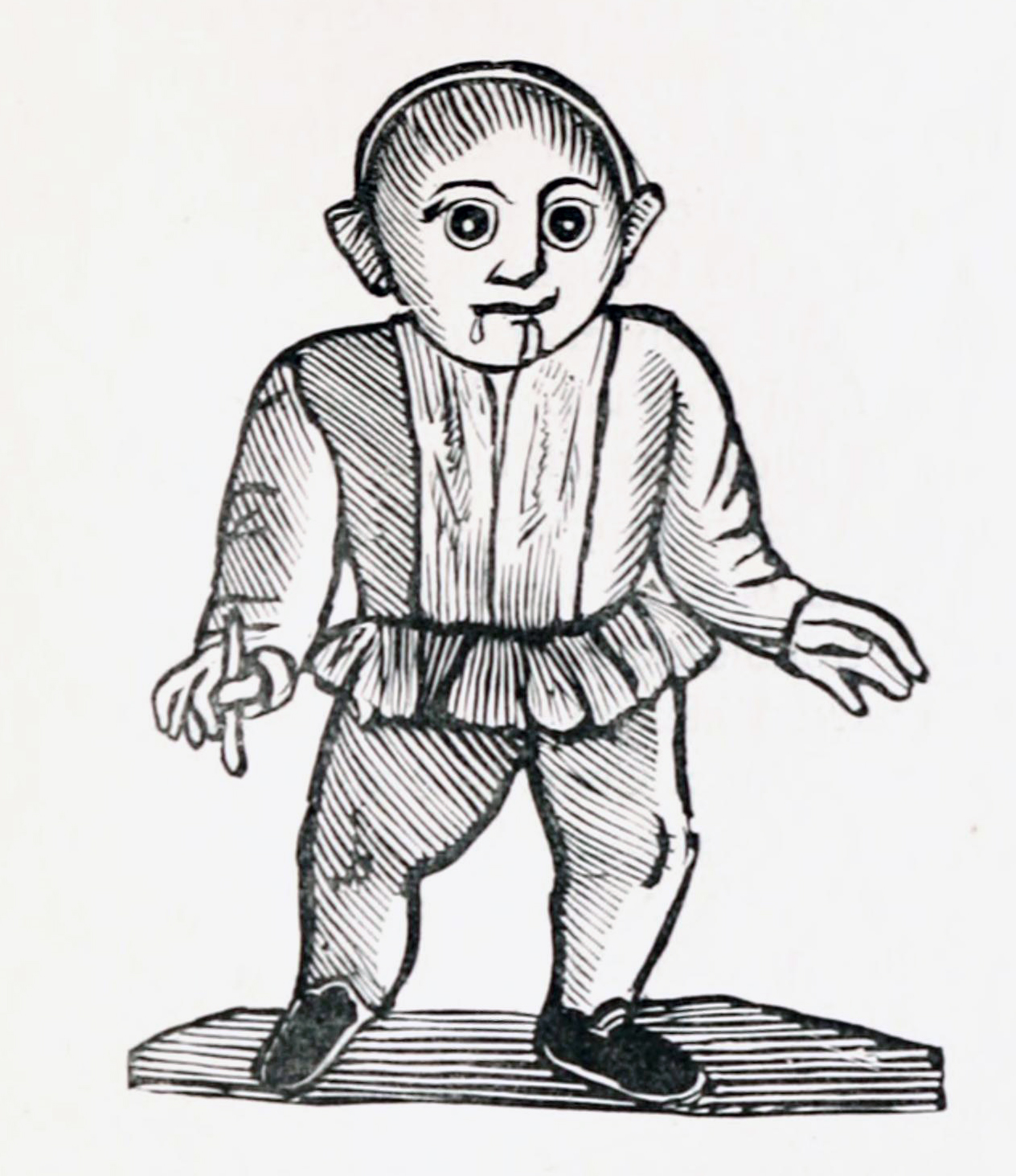
Robert Nixon, 18C. "prophet"

The following people were born or brought up in Winsford:

- Robert Nixon, 18th-century so-called "prophet", reputedly born in Winsford
- Sir John Bradbury, 1st Baron Bradbury (1872–1950), a British economist and public servant.
- Gertrude Maud Robinson (1886–1954), organic chemist, worked on plant pigments
- James Clarke (1894–1947), recipient of the Victoria Cross in World War I
- David Hanson, Baron Hanson of Flint (born 1957), Labour Party politician, educated at Verdin County Comprehensive School
- John Bishop (born 1966), comedian, grew up partially in Winsford
- Clare Calbraith (born 1974), actress
- The Luka State (formed in 2012), British rock group

=== Sport ===
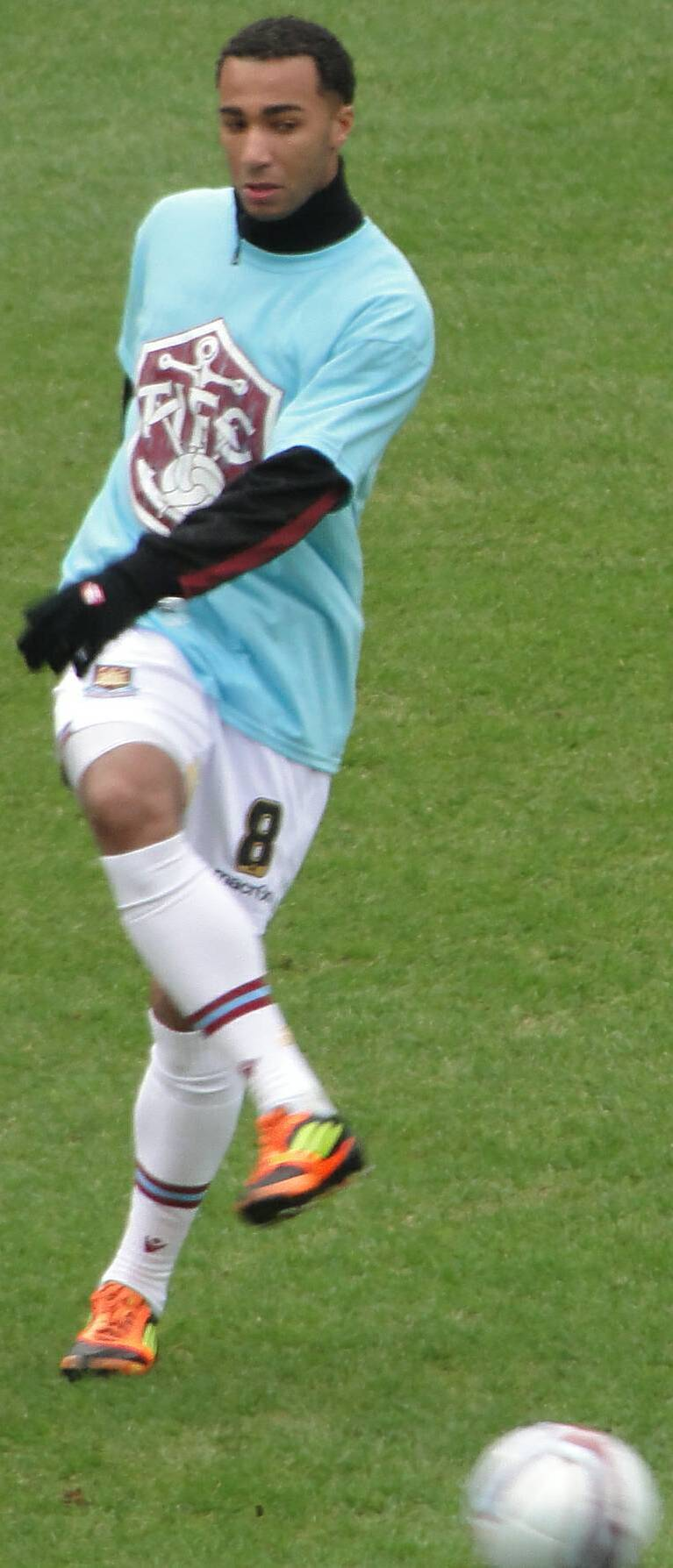
Nicky Maynard, 2012

- Tom Brittleton (1882–1955), footballer, played 516 games mainly for Sheffield Wednesday F.C. and 5 for England
- Jack Oakes (1905–1992), footballer, played 231 games mainly for Charlton Athletic F.C.
- Stan Wood (1905–1967), footballer, played 256 games for West Bromwich Albion F.C.
- Alan Oakes (born 1942), footballer and football manager; played 776 games including 562 for Manchester City F.C.
- Glyn Pardoe (1946–2020), footballer played 305 games for Manchester City F.C.
- Gareth Griffiths (born 1970), footballer played 364 games including 184 for Rochdale A.F.C.
- Simon Davies (born 1974), footballer played 210 games and 1 for Wales
- David Mannix (born 1985), retired footballer played 255 games
- Nicky Maynard (born 1986), footballer played over 450 games
- Daniel Fox (born 1986), footballer, born in Winsford played 457 games.
- Charlie Kirk (born 1997), footballer who has played over 250 games, mainly for Crewe Alexandra F.C.
- Sandy MacIver (born 1998), football goalkeeper for Washington Spirit in the US

== Twin town ==
Winsford is twinned with:

- Deuil-la-Barre, France (since 1993).

Winsford also has an informal friendship link with:

- Nieder-Eschbach, Germany, which is itself twinned with Deuil-la-Barre.

== See also ==
- Listed buildings in Winsford
- Rail accidents in Winsford (disambiguation)
- Salt in Cheshire – a summary of Cheshire's salt industry.
