= 1948 Winsford railway accident =

Railway accident in the UK

Winsford rail accident (1948)
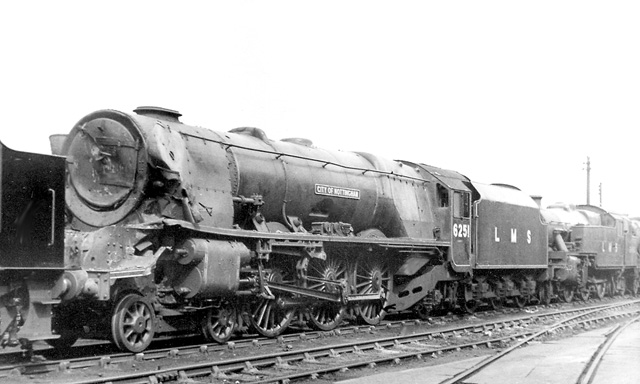

Details
- Date: 17 April 1948; 00:27
- Location: Winsford railway station, Cheshire
- Coordinates: 53.197°N 2.499°W
- Country: England
- Line: West Coast Main Line
- Operator: British Railways
- Cause: Signaller's error

Statistics
- Trains: 2
- Deaths: 24
- Injured: 10

On 17 April 1948, 24 people died when the 17:40 Glasgow to London Euston train hauled by LMS Princess Royal Class 4-6-2 No 6207 Princess Arthur of Connaught was stopped after the communication cord was pulled by a passenger (a soldier on leave who presumably lived near Winsford and was seen to leave the train after it had stopped). The stopped train was then run into by a following postal express hauled by LMS Coronation Class 4-6-2 No 6251 City of Nottingham.

The collision happened at between 40 and 45 mph (64 and 72 km/h) and was so severe that only five of the ten passenger coaches could be pulled away on their wheels and only the rear eight of the 13 Postal coaches could be pulled back. 24 passengers were killed. The signalman at Winsford had failed to observe whether the passenger train had passed his box and had then, in error, reported the passenger train clear of the section and accepted the postal train.

The person who pulled the emergency cord was a railway employee who worked as a signalbox lad in Winsford Junction, but was currently serving in the army having been called up. He thought that the train would be perfectly safe because he knew how the signalling equipment of the time in that area worked; but he did not know that the train had stopped short of the track circuit, which would have given an additional reminder to the signalman of its presence. He attended the enquiry to confess, and was still a signalman in Winsford Junction until he retired in the 1990s.
