= Listed buildings in Winsford =

Winsford is a civil parish in Cheshire West and Chester, England. It contains 26 buildings that are recorded in the National Heritage List for England as designated listed buildings. The largest town in the parish is Winsford, which absorbed the communities of Over and Wharton as it grew. Historically it is in a salt-producing area, although this is not directly reflected in any of the listing buildings. The Middlewich Branch of the Shropshire Union Canal passes through the parish, and one of its bridges is listed. The area around the town is mainly rural. Most of the listed buildings are houses, or related to farming. Also included in the list are some municipal buildings, four memorials, and three churches and structures associated with them. Part of the parish was formerly owned by the estate of Vale Royal Abbey, and two of their properties, since adapted for other purposes, are listed.

== Key ==
Grade	Criteria
Grade II*	Particularly important buildings of more than special interest.
Grade II	Buildings of national importance and special interest.

== Buildings ==
Name and location	Photograph	Date	Notes	Grade
St Chad's Church; 53.1818°N 2.5249°W		14th century (probable)	Constructed in sandstone, the church was remodelled in 1543. Restorations and additions were made in 1829, 1868–78, 1897–98, 1904–05, and 1926. Most of the church, including the west tower, is in Perpendicular style, except for the east window, which is in Decorated style.	II*
Cross base, St Chad's Church; 53.18161°N 2.52484°W		c. 1543	In yellow sandstone, this consists of a stepped octagonal base carrying a truncated section of a cross shaft. It has been converted into use as a sundial, and is a scheduled monument.	II
Littler Grange; 53.1937°N 2.5532°W	—	Late 16th century	The original part of the house is timber-framed with painted wattle and daub infill on a sandstone plinth. To this a brick extension was added in the 19th century. Both parts are in two storeys, and the roofs are slated. The upper storey of the older part is jettied, with a jettied gable. The windows are casements.	II
Catsclough Cottage; 53.2033°N 2.5385°W	—	17th century	The original part is timber-framed with brick infill. It is in a single storey with an attic. On the right is a larger 20th-century extension in brick with two storeys. The roofs are slated or tiled.	II
246 Delamere Street; 53.1945°N 2.5504°W	—	Mid to late 17th century	A timber-framed house with rendered infill and some wattle and daub. The house is in two storeys, and has a tiled roof. There have been additions in the 18th and 20th centuries. On the ground floor are two bowed oriel windows, and in the upper floor are three gabled dormers.	II
Knights Grange Public House; 53.1995°N 2.5398°W	—	Mid to late 17th century	Originating as a house owned by Vale Royal Abbey, it was later converted into a public house. It is constructed in brick with a slate roof. The building is in two storeys, and has an E-shaped plan.	II
Dawk House; 53.1876°N 2.5377°W	—	1717	A timber-framed house on a projecting plinth. The front and sides of the house are almost completely rendered; the back has rendered infill. The house is in two storeys and has three bays. The right bay projects forward and is gabled. The windows are casements.	II
Barn, Knights Grange Recreation Centre; 53.1997°N 2.5405°W	—	Early to mid 18th century	This originated as a barn owned by Vale Royal Abbey, which was later converted into a sports centre. It is a brick building with a slate roof in two storeys. Some features, including loft doors and vents of various shapes, have been retained.	II
Wharton Hall; 53.1998°N 2.5084°W	—	Mid 18th century	This originated as a house, later used as a nursing home. It is constructed in rendered brick with a slate roof. The house is in two storeys, and has a double depth plan. The doorway is flanked by 3/4 columns and has a fanlight. The windows are sashes. There are later extension on both sides of the house.	II
Old Vicarage; 53.1801°N 2.5297°W	—	Late 18th to early 19th century	A brick house with a slate roof, in two storeys with a basement and attic. The front is symmetrical with three bays. The central bay projects forward and contains a round-arched doorway and a fanlight. At its top is a pediment containing a Diocletian window.	II
Woodford Hall; 53.1801°N 2.5589°W		Late 18th to early 19th century	A farmhouse in brick on a stone plinth with ashlar dressings and a slate roof. It is in three storeys, and has a symmetrical entrance front in three bays. There is a central doorway with a porch carried on Tuscan columns. Most of the windows are sashes.	II
Gatepiers and churchyard walls, St Chad's Church; 53.18163°N 2.52539°W	—	1810	The walls and gatepiers are in red sandstone ashlar. The 19th-century gates are in cast iron, and the 20th-century overthrow is in wrought iron. A metal plaque carries an inscription and the date.	II
80 Wharton Road; 53.1947°N 2.5108°W	—	Early 19th century	A brick house with a slate roof, in two storeys. The front is in three bays with a central doorway. In front of the house is a glazed verandah with cast iron supports. Between the upper floor windows are pilaster buttresses. On each side of the house is a two-storey bow window with a semi-conical roof. The other windows are sashes.	II
Hughes Bridge; 53.18431°N 2.47549°W		1827–33	An accommodation bridge crossing the Middlewich Branch of the Shropshire Union Canal providing access to Park Farm. Designed by Thomas Telford, it is in brick with a stone band and coping.	II
Cross, base and lock-up 53.19143°N 2.54337°W	—	c. 1830 (probable)	Constructed in yellow sandstone ashlar, the cross base is very large, and accommodated the local lock-up. On the front are nine steps and a blocked doorway. It carries a small, undecorated cross.	II
St John's Church; 53.1922°N 2.5481°W		1860–63	A church designed by John Douglas for Lord Delamere. It is constructed in sandstone with a slate roof, and is in Gothic Revival style. At the southwest corner is a steeple with three clock faces and lucarnes.	II
Congregational Church; 53.1884°N 2.5399°W		1864–65	Designed by John Douglas, the church is built in polychromatic brick arranged in alternating red and white bands on a blue plinth, and with diapering. The roof has polychromatic slates. Other features include a two-column loggia carved with depictions of Luther and Calvin, and gabled turrets.	II
Memorial; 53.19248°N 2.54796°W	—	1874	A memorial in the churchyard of St John's Church to those who died as a result of the fire at the Over Cotton Mill. It is in yellow sandstone ashlar, standing on a square plinth. Above this is a square body with an octagonal top including gables and a cross. It is inscribed with a text and the four names of those who died.	II
Verdin Technical School; 53.1930°N 2.5306°W		1895	The technical school was paid for by Sir Joseph Verdin, salt manufacturer, and designed by Messrs Woodhouse and Willoughby, Architects, of Manchester and constructed by Messrs James Fowles and Sons of Winsford. It is a school building in red brick with ashlar dressings, terracotta decoration, and a tile roof. It is in two storeys with an attic. The entrance front has three wide bays, with a lower wing on each side. Its features include shaped gables, and winged lions as finials.	II
Brunner Guildhall; 53.1929°N 2.5313°W		1899	Designed by A. E. Powles of Northwich, the hall was given to the town by Sir John Brunner. It is constructed in brick with terracotta dressings and a slate roof. It has an almost symmetrical front in eight bays. There are shaped gables on each end and over the half-dormers.	II
Boer War Memorial; 53.19161°N 2.52916°W		1906	A memorial to those who served in the Boer War. It consists of a yellow sandstone base, with a grey granite plinth carrying the white marble statue of a soldier in battledress. It contains inscriptions, including the names of those who died and those who survived.	II
Primary School; 53.1931°N 2.5299°W	—	1906	Built as a primary school, now part of a secondary school. It is a brick building with ashlar dressings and a slate roof. It is in a single storey, and the middle three bays project forward. They are surmounted by a gable with ball finials, and contain four pilaster buttresses.	II
War memorial, St Chad's Church; 53.18151°N 2.52556°W	—	1918	The war memorial stands at the entrance to the churchyard. It is in stone, and consists of a Latin cross with carved decoration at the ends and a decorative collar. This is on a tapering octagonal shaft with a moulded foot, and below is a square plinth with a moulded foot on a base of two steps. There are inscriptions and the names of those lost in the First World War on the plinth and the base. Around the memorial is a gravelled area with stone kerbs.	II
War Memorial, Congregational Church; 53.18863°N 2.53973°W	—	1920	The war memorial stands outside the church, it is in yellow sandstone ashlar with granite plaques. The base supports a square block carrying a cast iron lamp stand and a hexagonal lantern. The lamp stand is decorated with foliage and twisted ladder supports. The plaques bear inscriptions and the names of those who died in both World Wars.	II
Wharton War Memorial; 53.19539°N 2.50590°W	—	1920	The war memorial is in the churchyard of Christ Church. It is about 5 metres (16 ft) tall, constructed in Darley stone and timber, and consists of a hooded Calvary. The wooden carved Crucifixion scene is on a slender octagonal shaft. The shaft rises from a low stone octagonal pedestal on a large stone octagonal plinth, which stands on a base of three steps. There are inscriptions on the pedestal and the plinth, and the names of those lost are on the plinth.	II
