= James Clarke (VC) =

English Victoria Cross recipient (1894-1947)

- Born: 6 April 1894; Winsford, Cheshire
- Died: 16 June 1947 (aged 53); Rochdale, Lancashire
- Burial place: Rochdale Cemetery
- Military career
- Allegiance: United Kingdom
- Branch: British Army
- Service years: 1915-1919
- Rank: Regimental Sergeant Major
- Service number: 37721
- Units: Lancashire Fusiliers
- Conflicts: World War I
- Awards: Victoria Cross

Regimental Sergeant Major James Clarke VC (6 April 1894 – 16 June 1947) was an English recipient of the Victoria Cross, the highest and most prestigious award for gallantry in the face of the enemy that can be awarded to British and Commonwealth forces.

He was born in Winsford, Cheshire. Leaving school at the age of 14, he worked as a day-labourer, before enlisting in the Lancashire Fusiliers in October 1915. He was 24 years old and an acting company sergeant major in the 15th Battalion, Lancashire Fusiliers, British Army during the First World War when he performed the deeds which resulted in the award of the Victoria Cross. His citation reads:

No. 37721 Sjt. John [sic] Clarke, 15th Bn., Lanc. Fus (Rochdale).

For most conspicuous bravery and initiative during the attack at Happegarbes on 2 November 1918, when in command of a platoon, he led his men forward with great determination, and, on being held up by heavy machine-gun fire, rushed forward through a thick, strongly held ridge, captured in succession four machine guns, and single-handed bayonetted the crews. Later, he led the remnants of his platoon to the capture of three machine guns and many prisoners. In the later stages of the attack on the same day, when his platoon was held up by enemy machine guns, he successfully led a Tank against them over very exposed ground. Continuing the attack on 3rd November, after capturing many prisoners and gaining his objective, he organised his line most skilfully and held up the enemy. On 4th November, in the attack on the Oise-Sambre Canal, under heavy fire from the Canal bank, he rushed forward with a Lewis gun team in the face of an intense barrage, brought the gun into action, effectively silenced the enemy's fire, thus enabling his company to advance and gain their objectives. Throughout the whole of these operations Sjt. Clarke acted with magnificent bravery and total disregard of personal safety, and by his gallantry and high sense of duty set an inspiring example to all ranks.

The forename in the original citation was subsequently corrected.

He did not find much success in civilian life. On 8 June 1946, Clarke participated in the World War II Victory Parade. He died the following year of pneumonia. His VC is on display in the Lord Ashcroft Gallery at the Imperial War Museum, London.

== Bibliography ==
- Gliddon, Gerald (2014) [2000]. The Final Days 1918. VCs of the First World War. Stroud, Gloucestershire: History Press. ISBN 978-0-7509-5368-9.
