= Winsford Town Council =

UK local authority for the town of Winsford, Cheshire, England

Winsford Town Council is the lowest tier of the local government of Winsford, Cheshire and the direct successor of the old Manor Court of the Mayors of "Over" dating back to around 1280. Although the title of Town Mayor has only been in existence since the Local Government reforms of 1974, the Mayor is still able to be called Mayor of "Over".

The original Town Hall near the river was burnt down in 1946 and the Council met for many years in a former manufacturer's mansion at Over Hall (now The Loont). This was deemed impractical for modern council business and the Council now has an office in Wyvern House, offices for Cheshire West and Chester Council.

== Regalia ==
In front of the mayor on civic occasions are two wardens each carrying a silver mace. The oldest dates from around 1660 and is made of silver around a wooden core. It was presented by the owner of Vale Royal Abbey mansion during this time, although it is unclear exactly by whom and when. It shows the arms of Cheshire and the arms of the Cholmondeley family below the crown. There is also a Tudor rose and a fleur-de-lys, emblems of England and France. There may have been an earlier mace, which was destroyed at the time of Oliver Cromwell, when maces were considered a sign of loyalty to Charles I. It is still in the possession of Winsford Town Council.

The second mace was given in 1910 by Sir John Brunner the local MP.

The original mace was taken to Kenya by Lord Delamere who was responsible in the 19th century for opening Kenya to white settlers. It was his property and he approved each mayor by presenting the mace. In 1946 his son, who had settled in Kenya, returned the old mace to Winsford when he sold the remaining family land.

The mayor wears the red robe and hat made by the London robe makers to Queen Victoria and the gold chain of Office that was presented in 1894 to the former Urban District of Winsford. For many years an additional link was added to record the names of each Chairman and then Mayor. However, it eventually became so heavy that it was difficult to wear and the silver links were detached and put on display in the Town Council Chamber, which is furnished with heavy committee tables given by Sir John Brunner.

== Crest ==
The town's crest (it is not a coat of arms) consists of three salt baskets dripping brine in honour of the salt industry, the lion on a castle from the arms of the Verdin family who were great benefactors to the area a century ago, the three wheatsheafs of Cheshire and the three lions of England with a crozier, the emblem of Vale Royal Abbey.

The Latin motto Cassis Tutissima Virtus may be translated as "virtue is the safest defence".
