= Over, Cheshire =

Coordinates: 53°11′06″N 02°32′26″W

Over
- Area
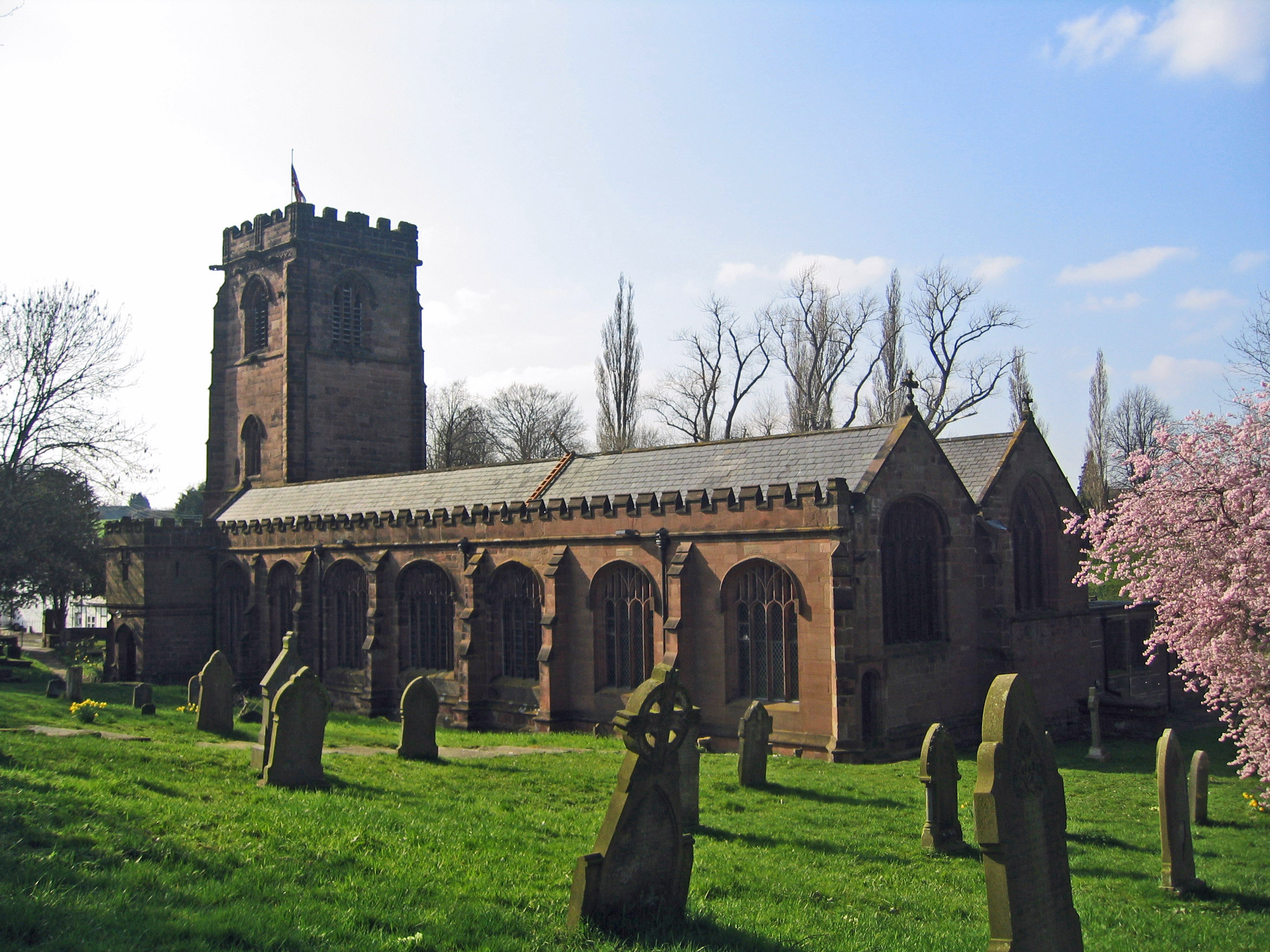
- St Chad's Church

- Location within Cheshire
- OS grid reference: SJ639654
- Civil parish: Winsford
- Unitary authority: Cheshire West and Chester
- Ceremonial county: Cheshire
- Region: North West
- Country: England
- Sovereign state: United Kingdom
- Post town: WINSFORD
- Postcode district: CW7
- Dialling code: 01606
- Police: Cheshire
- Fire: Cheshire
- Ambulance: North West
- UK Parliament: Mid Cheshire

Over is a suburb of Winsford in the Cheshire West and Chester borough of Cheshire, England. It was formerly a separate village and ancient borough. Before the 1875, Over and Wharton surrounded the River Weaver but it has now been administered as part of Winsford.

== History ==
=== Ancient origins ===
Over owes its origins to the ice age when melt waters from the last ice sheet left a long line of sand expanding from near Frodsham in the north to beyond Nantwich in the south. The main road through Delamere Street and Swanlow Lane follows this line and is about 200 feet (60 metres) above sea level. One mile (two kilometres) or so to the east, the River Weaver cuts a deep valley through the glacial clay. As there are few real hills in central Cheshire it would have been an ideal site for early settlers, who generally avoided valleys. Prehistoric tools have occasionally been found along the route, showing that the area had been used for many thousands of years before the first mention of the name in the Domesday Book of 1086.

=== Saxon times ===
The earliest evidence of anyone living in the area is the piece of a Saxon stone cross, which was found between the World Wars when St Chad's Church was altered. The fragment is on display in the church today. Saint Chad was the first bishop of the Midlands in the 7th century. There are various churches dedicated to him in Cheshire and throughout the Midlands. As it is recorded that he travelled around converting the pagans, it is possible that he converted early converts in a spring in what might have been a sacred valley at the edge of the forest. The ancient churchyard of the St Chad's church still shows a circular shape, which is usually a clue to an ancient, and often Pre-Christian, foundation. No church however is mentioned in the written records before the time of the Normans.

=== Norman rule ===
The Norman Earls of Chester had a hunting lodge or summer palace at Darnhall in Over parish. There was an enclosed area where deer and wild boar were kept to be hunted by the Earl and his guests. It was there that the last Norman Earl met his death. It was rumoured that his wife, Helen, the daughter of the Prince of Wales, had poisoned him to favour the powerful aristocrat that her daughter had married. However, as this was the time of the Barons' Wars, King Henry III took control of the county and of the manor himself and even spent time at Darnhall. It was during this time that the brook there was dammed to drive three water mills and to make pools to keep fish.

The first mention of a priest is in 1307 when a Thomas de Dutton is mentioned, but it is uncertain if this was at St. Chad's or as a chaplain at Darnhall, or both. The church and responsibility for the parish was given to St. Mary's convent in Chester, who appointed the priests in charge.

=== King Edward I and the foundation of Vale Royal Abbey ===
When Henry's son Edward was old enough, he was made Earl of Chester and took great pride in the county. On becoming King Edward I he granted several town charters for markets and defended Chester in readiness for wars in Wales. He also made a vow to found an abbey in Cheshire when he was in danger of shipwreck. As he had visited Darnhall and knew its quiet, secluded setting, he chose this area as a site for Cistercian monks. This religious order chose to live in the wildest places possible, bringing their farming skills to clear forest and to bring unused land into use for farming. A group of monks arrived from Dore Abbey in Herefordshire to set up the new abbey, but they were soon allowed to move to a better site that we now know as Vale Royal Abbey.

In 1277 the king and queen arrived in the Parish of Over to lay the foundation stones of the new abbey, which was planned to be the biggest of its kind in the country. Although the Abbot became lord of the manor, the church and parish remained the property of the convent at Chester, so Over paid tithes to both the Abbey and Convent. For a period of around 50 years, between the foundation of Vale Royal and the death of Abbot Peter, the tenants and villeins of Over periodically rebelled against the abbey's overlordship, sometimes violently.

=== New owners ===
In 1545 Vale Royal Abbey and its lands were sold during the dissolution of the monasteries, with Over being purchased by Thomas Holcroft for £466.10s.1d who sold it almost at once to Edmund Pershall.

Pershall was a London merchant who saw his purchase as a long-term investment. He got regular rents and hoped the properties would increase in value. Over was sold in the middle of the 17th Century to Thomas Cholmondeley, son of Lady Mary Cholmondeley who had purchased Vale Royal Abbey.

=== Civil War ===
In 1643, Royalists escaping from Nantwich "sacked" Over. The situation during the English Civil War was very dangerous to everyone – proof of this was discovered when workmen in Nixon Drive found a little black ale mug full of silver coins, with a date range from Queen Elizabeth I to 1643. The coins were declared a treasure trove and are now at the Grosvenor Museum in Chester.

=== Later 17th century ===
A silver mace was presented by the owner of Vale Royal Abbey mansion in this time, although it is unclear exactly by whom and when. It is still in the possession of Winsford Town Council.

Daniel King, who published his history of Cheshire in 1656, described Over thus: "tis but a small thing, but I place it here because of the great prerogative that it has, for it had a mayor". He included it in the list of boroughs of Cheshire for, despite being a tiny village, its mayor was of equal rank to the mayor of Chester.

=== 18th century ===
Robert Nixon, sometimes known as the 'Palatine Prophet' and who came from Over, may have lived at this time.

The government gave permission for improvements to be made to the River Weaver in 1721 to allow large barges to reach Winsford from the port of Liverpool. At first, this was the closest that barges carrying china clay from Cornwall could get to The Potteries. The clay was then taken overland by pack horses, who in turn would bring back the finished china to be sent for export through Liverpool. In 1744, the manager of the wharf, George Wood, took control of the trade between Winsford and Stoke. He made a reasonable fortune and built Oak House, which remained a farm just off Beeston Drive before the land was purchased to build the Over Estate and Oak house remained until the mid-1980s as the de Witt family residents when the land was taken by the town council for private housing and Oak House was demolished.

That trade ended in the 1780s when the Trent and Mersey Canal carried the goods through Middlewich and bypassed the town. The canalised Weaver was, however, the inspiration for the Duke of Bridgewater's canals and later the engineer for the Weaver Navigation, Edwin Leader Williams, designed and built the Manchester Ship Canal.

=== 19th century – the time of salt ===
The salt industry became firmly established in Winsford from the 1830s, bringing with it massive pollution. As the wind usually blew away from Over, it became the popular place for more wealthy people in the town to live. However, people who worked on the barges and other people working in Winsford started to develop along the old Over Lane, now the High Street. The old Borough tried to keep itself separate but had been connected by the 1860s.

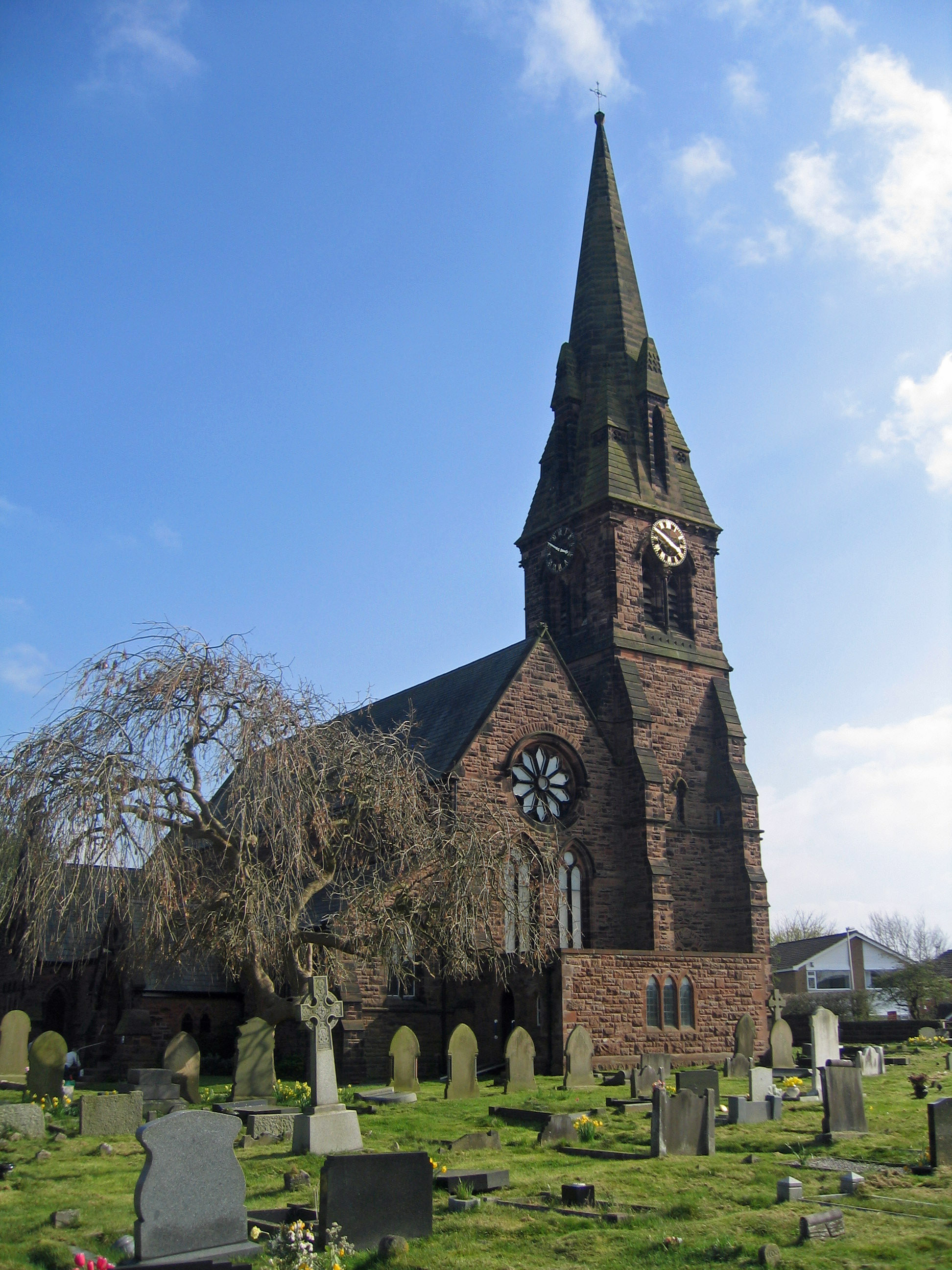
St John the Evangelist's Church

St John the Evangelist's Church was built between 1860 and 1863 on Delamere Street, much closer to the centre of Over than the ancient parish church of St Chad's, which stood in an isolated position to the south of the village. St John's was given a separate ecclesiastical parish from St Chad's in 1863.

In 1869 Abraham Haigh built a cotton mill at the end of what would become Well Street. He used the water supply trapped in the sand enclosed by clay on the Over Ridge to power steam engines. However, almost as soon as the building was completed most of it was destroyed, killing some of the workers who were then buried in a communal grave at St John's Church, where a monument records their names. A town fire engine, although ordered, had not yet been delivered by the time of the fire.

Baron Delamere, the major local landowner, sold most of his considerable property in the town in 1912, resisting the giving of the mace and title to the newly formed Winsford Urban District Council (possibly because he wanted to sell them). The mace was therefore taken back to Vale Royal Abbey and Sir William Verdin gave Winsford a new silver mace to mark the coronation of George V. In 1946 Baron Delamere's son, who had settled in Kenya, returned the old mace to Winsford when he sold the remaining family land.

== Governance ==
Over today forms part of the civil parish of Winsford. There are two tiers of local government covering Winsford, at civil parish (town) and unitary authority level: Winsford Town Council and Cheshire West and Chester Council.

=== Administrative history ===
Over was an ancient parish in the Eddisbury Hundred of Cheshire. The parish was historically subdivided into six townships: Darnhall, Little Budworth, Low Oulton, Marton, Wettenhall, and an Over township covering the central part of the parish including the village and the parish church of St Chad's. Some of the townships had chapels of ease. Little Budworth was owned by Chester Priory; that township was made a separate parish following the dissolution of the priory in 1540. A parish called Whitegate was created in 1542, covering the Darnhall and Marton townships and part of the Over township. From the 17th century onwards, parishes were gradually given various civil functions under the poor laws, in addition to their original ecclesiastical functions. In some cases, including Over, the civil functions were exercised by each township separately rather than the parish as a whole. In 1866, the legal definition of 'parish' was changed to be the areas used for administering the poor laws, and so the townships also became civil parishes, which therefore diverged from the ecclesiastical parishes.

Over was said to be an ancient borough from the time of Edward I (reigned 1272–1307). A government survey of boroughs in 1835 found no evidence of any municipal charters for Over, nor any sign of a municipal corporation. The only indicator of borough status was the fact that Over had a mayor. The mayor was chosen each year by the court leet of the Lord of the manor. The mayor then acted as a magistrate for the area during his term of office; the borough had no other practical functions. The borough was therefore left unreformed when the Municipal Corporations Act 1835 reformed most ancient boroughs across the country into municipal boroughs.

In 1875, a local government district called Winsford was created, administered by an elected local board. The Winsford district covered the combined area of the Over township and the neighbouring Wharton township on the east side of the River Weaver. For the next 11 years, the Winsford Local Board and the Mayor of Over existed alongside each other with their overlapping areas and separate roles; the modern local government functions of the local board, and the ancient but limited magisterial authority of the mayor.

In 1886, the old borough of Over was finally abolished. The court leet was given the right to continue to appoint a purely honorary mayor, but such mayors would not automatically be magistrates. The court leet chose not to continue the custom of appointing a mayor. The last mayor was Edmund Leigh, who held office 1880–1886. Following the abolition of the borough in March 1886, he was appointed a regular magistrate for the county instead.

Local government districts such as Winsford were reconstituted as urban districts under the Local Government Act 1894. The civil parish of Over was then classed as an urban parish, having no separate parish council but being directly governed by Winsford Urban District Council. The civil parish of Over was abolished in 1936, when the parishes within Winsford Urban District were united into a single parish called Winsford, alongside some adjustments to the boundaries with neighbouring parishes. At the 1931 census (the last before its abolition), the parish of Over had a population of 7,306.

== Sources ==
The historical information in this article is sourced from the booklet It's All Over: the story of a place on a Cheshire Hill by Brian Curzon, published by Winsford Town Council in 2006.
