= Blowback (steam engine) =

Type of failure of a steam engine

A blowback (also blow back or blow-back) is a failure of a steam locomotive, which can be catastrophic.

One type of blowback is caused when atmospheric air blows down the locomotive's chimney, causing the flow of hot gases through the boiler tubes to be reversed, with the fire itself being blown through the firehole onto the footplate, with potentially serious consequences for the crew. The risk of backdraught is higher when the locomotive enters a tunnel because of the pressure shock. Such blowbacks can be prevented by opening the blower before closing the regulator. Similar blowback can be caused by debris or other obstructions in the smokebox.

In the days when steam-hauled trains were common in the United Kingdom, blowbacks occurred fairly frequently. In a 1955 report on an accident near Dunstable, the Inspector wrote:

In 1953 twenty-three cases, which were not caused by an engine defect, were reported and they resulted in 26 enginemen receiving injuries. In 1954, the number of occurrences and of injuries were the same and there was also one fatal casualty.

He also recommended that the British Transport Commission carry out an investigation into the causes of blowbacks.

Blowbacks can also occur when a steam tube (or pipe) bursts in the boiler, allowing high-pressure steam to enter the firebox and thus egress onto the footplate. Other potential causes are unused mining explosives in the coal used to fuel the engine, and unburnt gases collecting in the firebox and then igniting.

== Examples ==
The 1965 Winsford railway accident was caused by a blowback. Driver Wallace Oakes died as a result, and his fireman Gwilym Roberts was severely injured.
