= Winsford Mine =

Salt mine in Cheshire, England

Winsford Mine Meadow Bank Mine
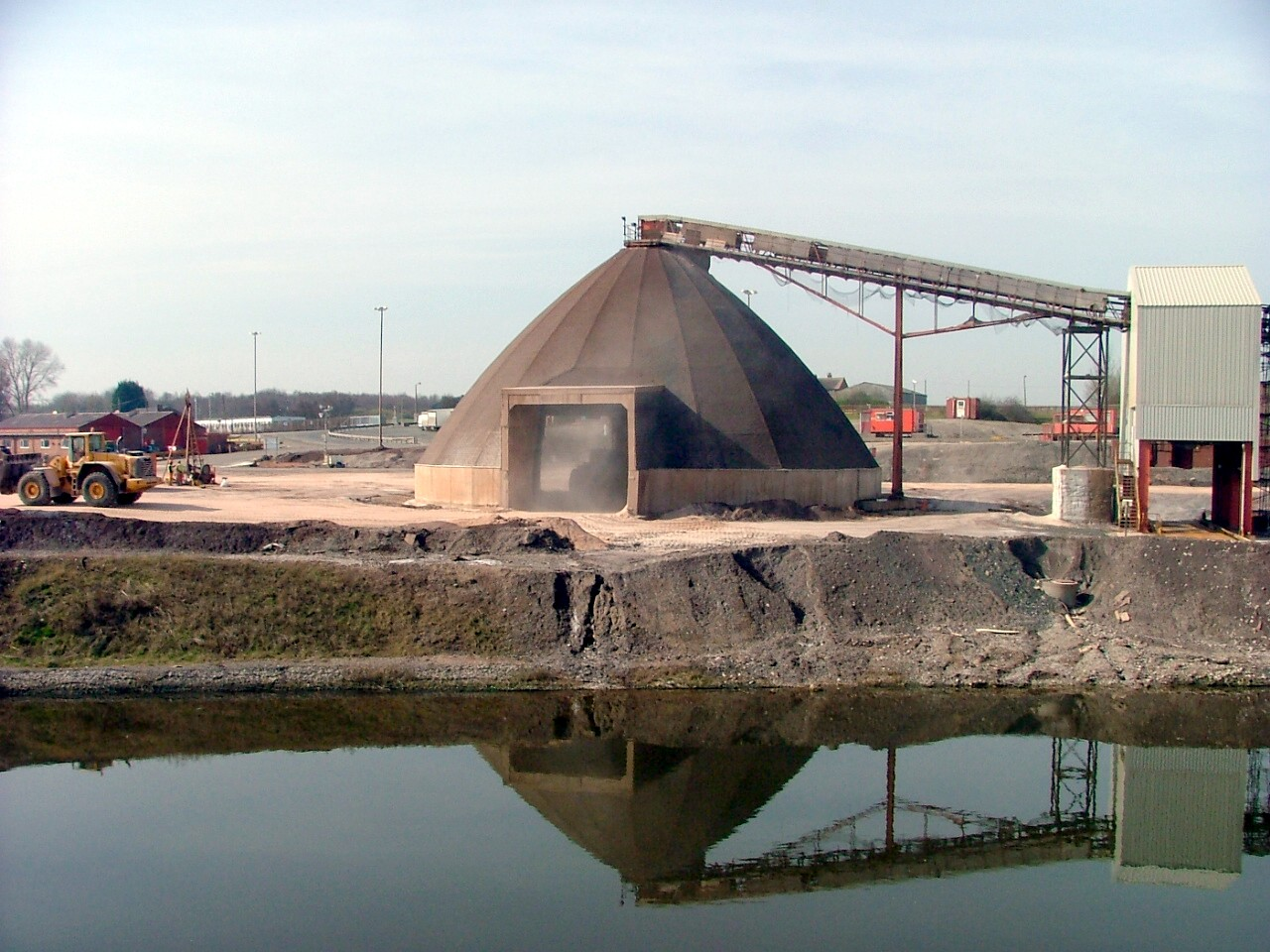
- Surface plant at Winsford Salt Mine

- Location within Cheshire
- Location: Winsford, Cheshire, England; 53.209°N 2.519°W
- Products: Halite (rock salt)
- Production: 2,200,000 tonnes (2,400,000 short tons)
- Financial year: 2020
- Greatest depth: 150 metres (490 ft)
- Discovered: 1844
- Opened: 1844
- Active: 1844–1892; 1928–present
- Company: Compass Minerals
- Website: Official website
- Acquired: 2003

Winsford Mine (also known as Meadow Bank Mine) is a halite (rock salt) mine in the town of Winsford, Cheshire, England. The mine produces an average of 750kt - 800kt of rock salt a year, which is used to grit public roads in the United Kingdom during the winter months. Two other mines also produce rock salt within the United Kingdom, but Winsford has the biggest output of all three and has the largest market share.

It is also Britain's oldest working mine.

== History ==
The salt in the area was discovered by accident when workers were looking for coal reserves to heat saltpans. It was opened out in 1844, but a downturn in the rock salt market led to its closure in 1892. It was re-opened in 1928 when a nearby salt mine, the Marston Mine in Northwich, was subjected to flooding after subsidence. The salt was laid down during the Triassic period over 220 million years ago when the area was under a tropical sea, and later a briny lagoon. Reserves in the mine area have an estimated life until the year 2076, though this is dependent on planning permissions.

The mine, which is sometimes referred to by its old name of Meadow Bank Mine, has over 260 kilometres (160 mi) of tunnels which are held in place by a room and pillar method of mining. This leaves around 25% of the available rock salt behind to support the roof of the mineworkings. The salt content of the mined rock is around 92%, and whilst the majority of the product mined is used as road salt, some is used in fertiliser manufacture.

Although the mine was mothballed between 1892 and 1928, it is Britain's oldest working mine. It was granted an extension to its mining licence in 2012 which will see mining continuing to at least 2047. The mine produces 950,000–1,000,000 tonnes (1,050,000–1,100,000 short tons) of rock salt each year (30,000 tonnes (33,000 short tons) a week at peak production) and has a marketshare of around 90%. During the 19th century, export of the salt was by barge or boat on the River Weaver, but when the mine reopened in 1928, a railway connection was laid.

In the heavy snowfall of January 2010, lorries were shown on national TV at the mine surface plant loading salt supplies for many local authorities in England who were running out of stock for their gritters. Then prime minister, Gordon Brown, issued a plea to the mine's owners to increase production.

Of the three mines in the United Kingdom which produce rock salt, Winsford Mine has the largest marketshare. In 2004, 2,000,000 tonnes (2,200,000 short tons) was the combined output from all three mines, with over 900,000 tonnes (990,000 short tons) being mined at Winsford.

=== Storage ===
In 2006, it was estimated that the mine had over 26,000,000 cubic metres (920,000,000 cu ft) of free space, a dry humidity, a near constant temperature, and unlike many old collieries, is gas free. Some of this has been given over to the storage of hazardous wastes which are non-radioactive. The most notable storage commodity is documents and books; in 1998, Deepstore was created at Winsford Mine with documents from the National Archives stored there. They are protected against heat, humidity, ultraviolet light, rodents and flooding. The National Archives shelf space at Deepstore takes up over 32 kilometres (20 mi).

Hazardous waste storage at the site was granted a licence extension in 2022 of twenty years on its original permission (which was until 2025). The company can now keep storing wastes until 2045.

== Production tonnages ==
- 1959 – 100,000 tonnes (110,000 short tons)
- 1960 – 300,000 tonnes (330,000 short tons)
- 1964 – 900,000 tonnes (990,000 short tons)
- 1969 – 1,300,000 tonnes (1,400,000 short tons)
- 1971 – 1,800,000 tonnes (2,000,000 short tons)
- 1995 – 1,000,000 tonnes (1,100,000 short tons)
- 2017 – 1,500,000 tonnes (1,700,000 short tons)
- 2020 – 2,200,000 tonnes (2,400,000 short tons)

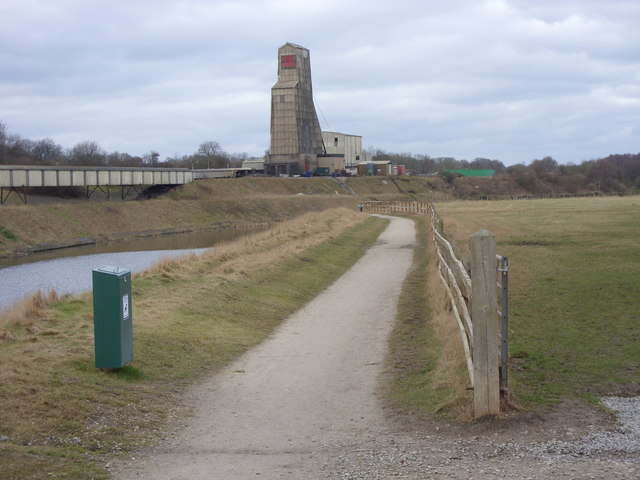
Salt Mine main shaft

== Owners ==
- 1844–1888 Falk Salt
- 1888–1938 Salt Union
- 1938–1992 ICI (a £47.5 million management buyout occurred in 1992)
- 1992–1998 Harris Chemical Group
- 1998–2003 IMC Global
- 2003–(present) Part of the Compass Minerals group
