= St Chad's Church, Over =

Coordinates: 53.1818°N 2.5249°W

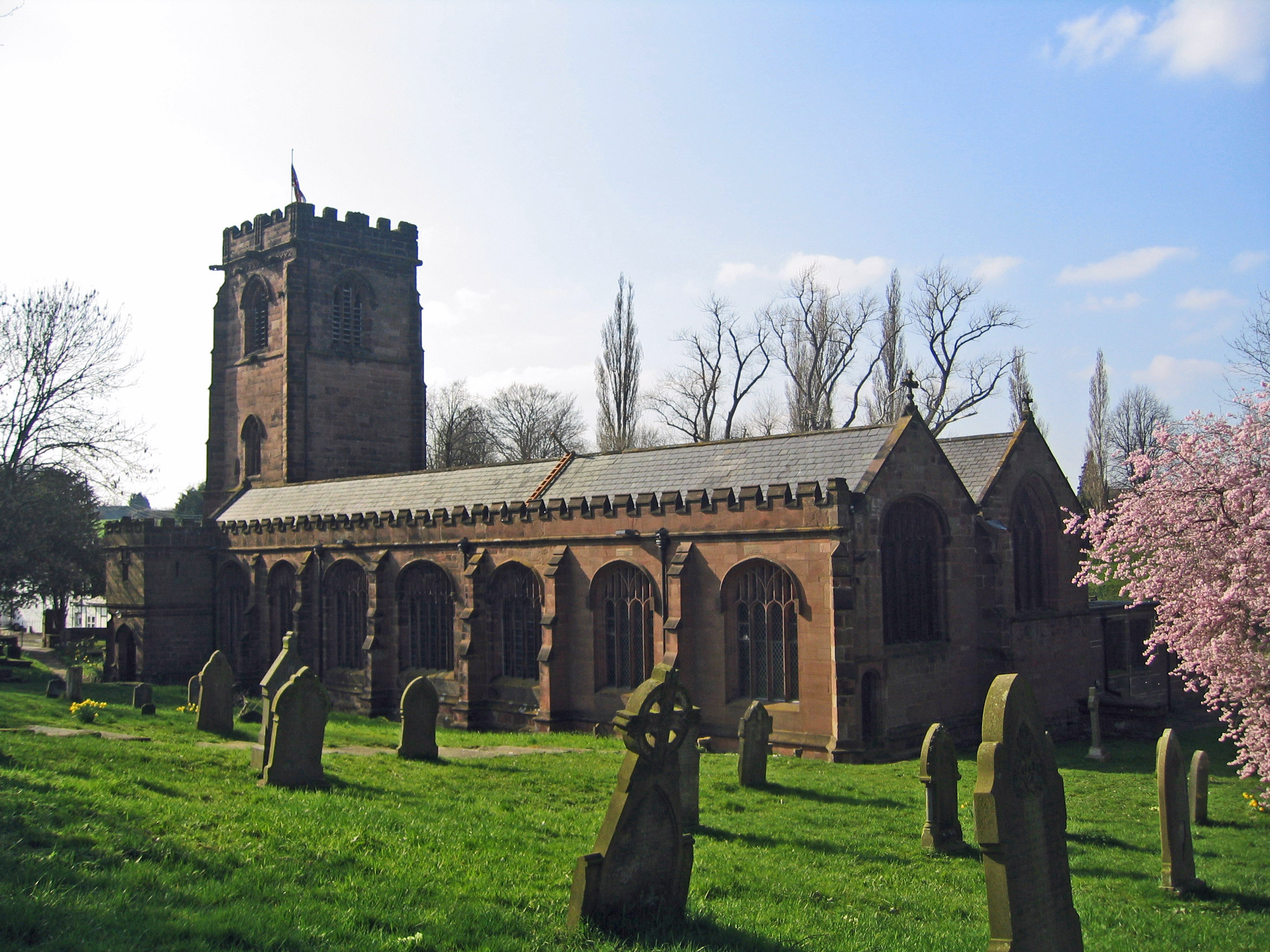
- St Chad's Church, Over, from the southeast

- Location in Cheshire
- OS grid reference: SJ 650,651
- Location: Winsford, Cheshire
- Country: England
- Denomination: Anglican
- Website: St Chad, Over

History
- Status: Parish church
- Dedication: Saint Chad
- Dedicated: 11 October 1949

Architecture
- Functional status: Active
- Heritage designation: Grade II*
- Architect(s): Ewan Christian and W Milford Teulon; John Douglas; Austin and Paley
- Architectural type: Church
- Style: Gothic, Gothic Revival
- Groundbreaking: 14th century
- Completed: 1926

Specifications
- Height: 74 feet (23 m)
- Materials: Red sandstone ashlar, lead roof

Administration
- Province: York
- Diocese: Chester
- Archdeaconry: Chester
- Deanery: Middlewich
- Parish: Over

Clergy
- Vicar: Revd. Callum Boothroyd

St Chad's Church, Over, is in the town of Winsford, Cheshire, England. It was formerly in the separate town of Over, but with the growth of Winsford it has become part of that town. The church is recorded in the National Heritage List for England as a designated Grade II* listed building. It is an active Anglican parish church in the diocese of Chester, the archdeaconry of Chester and the deanery of Middlewich.

== History ==
The church originates from the 14th century and it has been modified on a number of occasions. The original church consisted of a nave with a narrow north aisle, a wide south aisle and a chancel. The south aisle was built in 1543 by Hugh Starkie of Oulton, a gentleman usher to Henry VIII and a benefactor to Cheshire churches. In 1870 the church was restored by Ewan Christian and W. Milford Teulon. In 1897–98 the Lancaster architects Austin and Paley added vestries and an organ chamber. The north aisle was widened in 1904 by John Douglas of Chester. In about 1906 Austin and Paley carried out a further restoration; this included increasing the seating by 56, and installing heating, at an estimated cost of £899. The south aisle and nave were lengthened in 1926 but the 14th-century east window was retained. According to legend, the building was said to be named because St. Chad baptised locals in a stream nearby to the site of where the church is located today.

== Architecture ==
=== Exterior ===
The church is built of red sandstone ashlar with a lead roof. Its plan consists of a tower at the west end, a nave with aisles, a chancel, a vestry to the northeast, and a southeast porch. At the east end of each aisle is a chapel. The porch has two storeys, the upper projecting over the lower one. Most of the church is in Perpendicular style although the east window is Decorated.

=== Interior ===
A lavishly decorated stoup is in the porch, and Hugh Starkie's tomb lies in the sanctuary. The octagonal font is dated 1641. In the chancel is a decorated Saxon stone. This consists of a sarcophagus in a recess with a brass effigy.

There are fragments of medieval and 19th-century glass in one of the north windows. Three of the stained glass windows in the north aisle are by Kempe. The two-manual organ was built by Jardine and Company in 1916, and rebuilt in 1987 by Sixsmith. The parish registers begin in 1558 and the churchwardens' accounts in 1733.

=== Bells ===
The church originally had four bells, dated 1513, but these were recast into five bells by Rudhall of Gloucester in 1733. It currently has a ring of eight bells, cast by John Taylor and Company in 1915, which were re-hung in 1938.

== External features ==
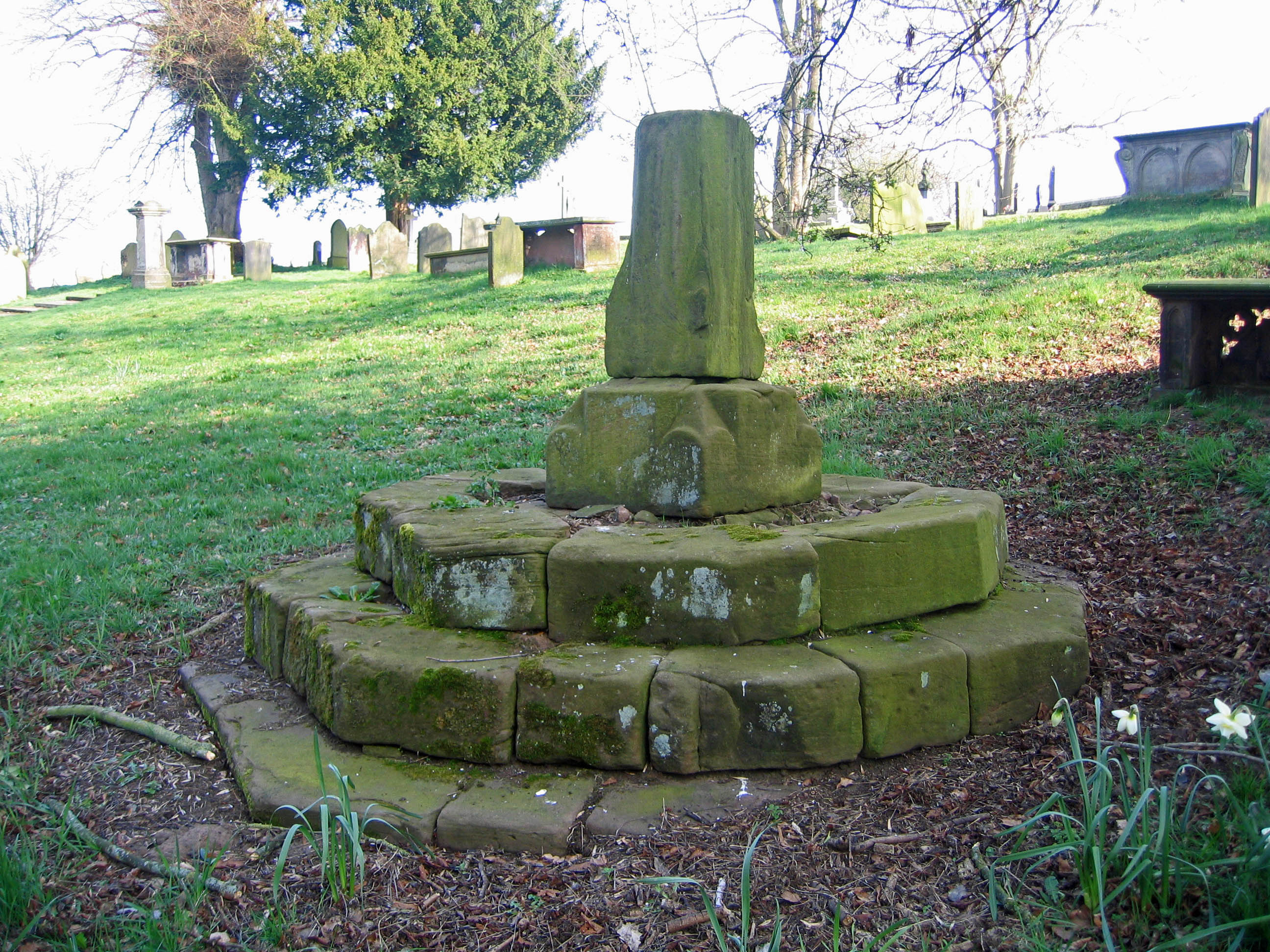
Cross base in churchyard

In the churchyard is a cross base dating from around 1543. It consists of a stepped octagonal base supporting the lower section of a cross shaft. It is listed Grade II. The red sandstone churchyard walls and gate piers are also listed at Grade II.

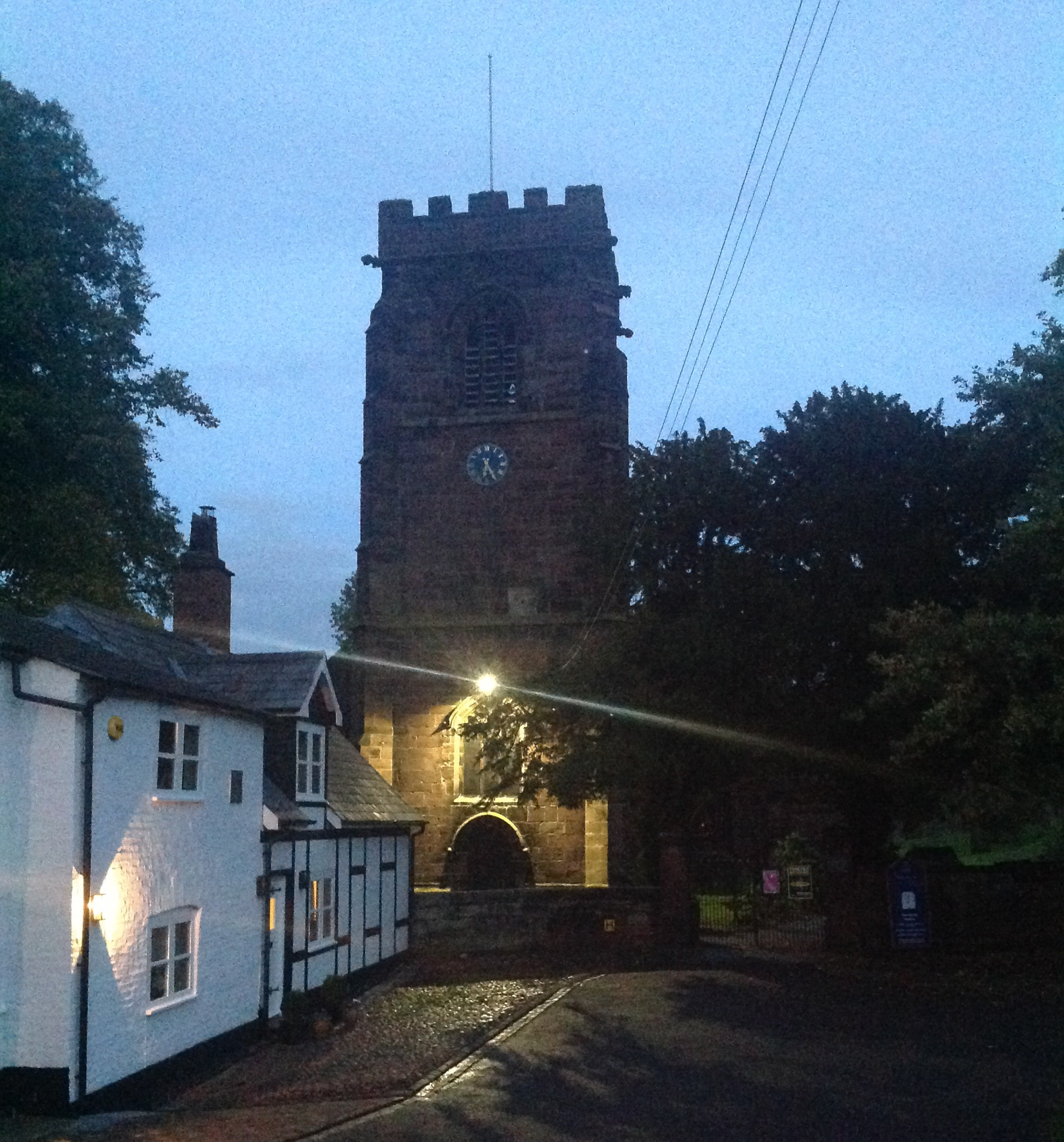
St Chads Church at night

== Popular culture ==
The church and its congregation featured on an episode of ITV’s Garages from Hell in 1998.

== See also ==
- Grade II* listed buildings in Cheshire West and Chester
- Listed buildings in Winsford
- List of ecclesiastical works by Austin and Paley (1895–1914)
- List of church restorations, amendments and furniture by John Douglas
