= 1999 Winsford railway accident =

Rail accident in the United Kingdom

Coordinates: 53.18501°N 2.48963°W

Winsford (1999) rail crash

Details
- Date: 23 June 1999
- Location: Winsford, Cheshire
- Country: England
- Line: West Coast Main Line
- Operator: Virgin Trains; First North Western
- Cause: SPAD due to human error

Statistics
- Trains: 2
- Deaths: 0
- Injured: 27 (23 minor, 4 major)

On 23 June 1999, a Virgin Trains electric express train from London Euston to Glasgow Central, hauled by Class 87 No 87027 Wolf of Badenoch, ran into an empty First North Western four-carriage Pacer unit, injuring 27 people. The express had been travelling at about 110 mph (180 km/h), but driver Roy Eccles noticed the Pacer on the line and was able to decelerate to about 50 mph (80 km/h) at the time of impact. Eccles was awarded a medal for his prompt action, which averted a much more serious accident. The driver of the Pacer train helped passengers from the Glasgow Central train despite his injuries.

The Pacer had passed a signal at danger and run through a set of points, coming to a stand on the line on which the express was approaching. Its rear cab was destroyed in the crash along with a section of the passenger accommodation, and the coach bodies were displaced from their underframes. The incident report stated that the accident was most likely to have been human error of the Pacer driver as the investigation showed no faults with either the signalling system or the brakes of the Pacer train.

Due to the severe level of damage sustained by the empty Pacer train, the safety of the units was investigated as part of the inquiry into the accident. In contrast, the strong construction of the express train carriages avoided any fatalities.
