= Robert Nixon (prophet) =

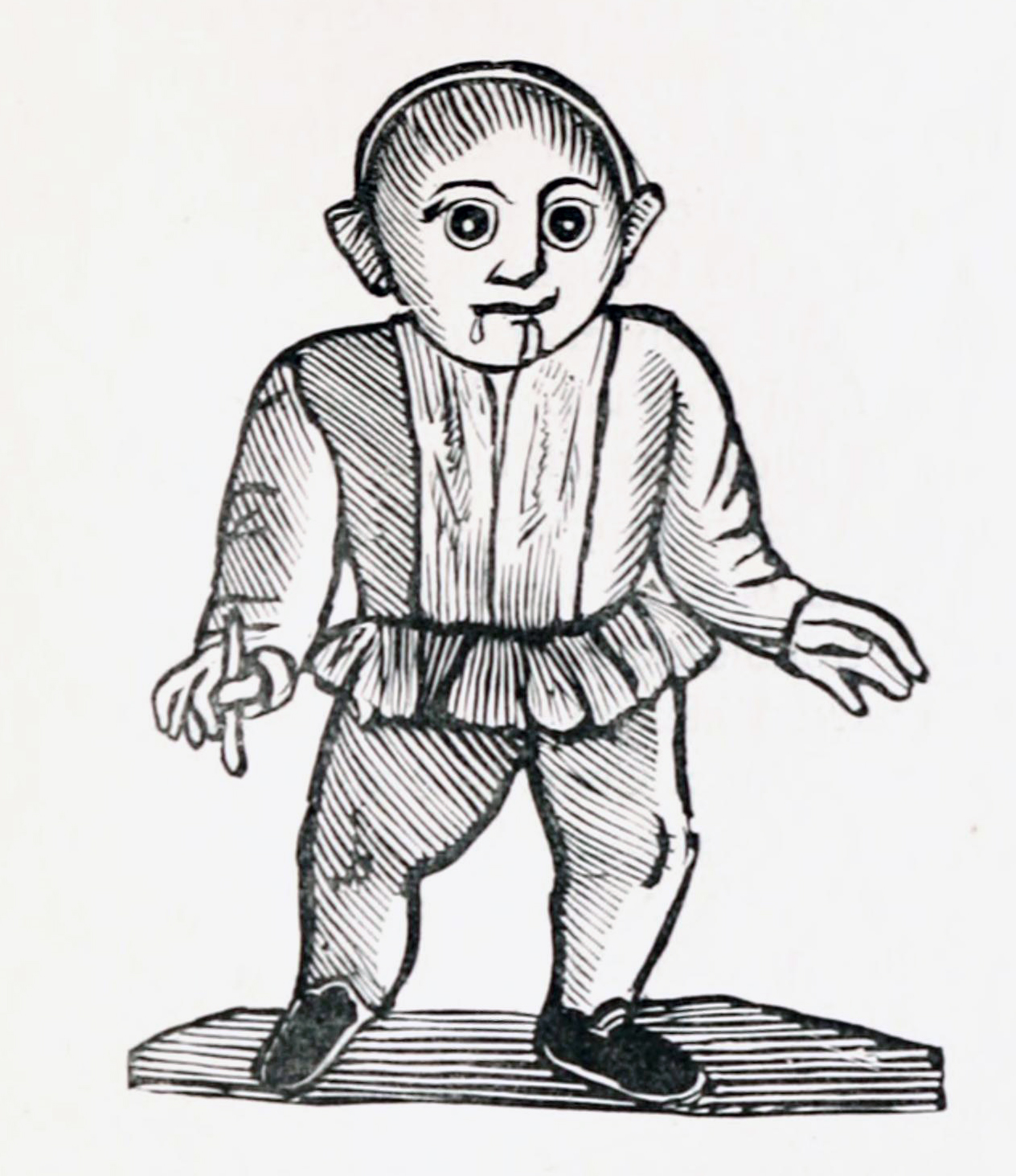
Illustration of an 18th century chapbook.

Robert Nixon was a legendary prophet of Cheshire. Many accounts about him appear to be in conflict with each other.

At least one account has Robert Nixon being born in c. 1467. In this account, he is the son of John Nixon during the time of Edward IV, who leased a farm in the parish of Over from Vale Royal Abbey. Another account of Nixon states that he was born during the reign of James I (1603–25) and that he was for some time in the service of Thomas Cholmondeley, master of Vale Royal after 1625.

There are also two claimed homes for Robert Nixon: one says he was an illiterate boy who was born in Bark House on a hill between Over and Whitegate. Alternatively, another source claims Robert Nixon lived at Bridge House near the Forest of Delamere.

He is the claimed source of various prophecies circulating in the early 18th century and published in leaflet form.

Some of his prophecies relate to Vale Royal Abbey.

== Prophecies ==
Summoned to the court of King Richard III, he refused, saying he would be "clemmed death", that is, starved to death. The King ordered him to be kept in the kitchen, but because he was always picking at food he was locked in the cupboard. The cook was called away and he starved to death.

According to Witchcraft, the history and mythology, “(King) Henry ordered that he be given all the food he wanted whenever he wanted. This was annoying to the kitchen staff, so whenever Henry left London he charged one of those officers with Robert’s safety. One day this officer was suddenly called away himself, so he locked Robert in the Kings own room for safekeeping. Unfortunately he forgot to tell anyone what he had done and when Robert was finally discovered, it was found that, as he predicted, he had starved to death.”

== Sources ==
- It's All Over by Brian Curzon, 2006.
- Nixon the Cheshire Prophet by HC Harper, Torsdag Publications, 1978. ISBN 0-906266-02-5: Contains the complete prophecies.
- Nixon's Prophecies in their historical setting by Jacqueline Simpson in Folklore, 1974, p.201-207
- Religion and the Death of Magic by Keith Thomas, Weidenfeld and Nicolson, 1971
- The original predictions oe [sic] Robert Nixon, commonly called the Cheshire prophet; in doggrel verse: published from an authentic manuscript, ... Together with Nixon's Cheshire prophecy at large; ... with historical and political remarks; ... Also, some particulars of his life; by John Oldmixon, Esq. and others. CW Leadbetter in Chester, 1798?
