= Barons' War =

Barons' War may refer to:

- First Barons' War (1215–1217) in England during the reign of John
- Second Barons' War (1264–1267) in England during the reign of Henry III
