= Winsford railway station =

Railway station in Cheshire, England

Coordinates: 53.191°N 2.495°W

Winsford
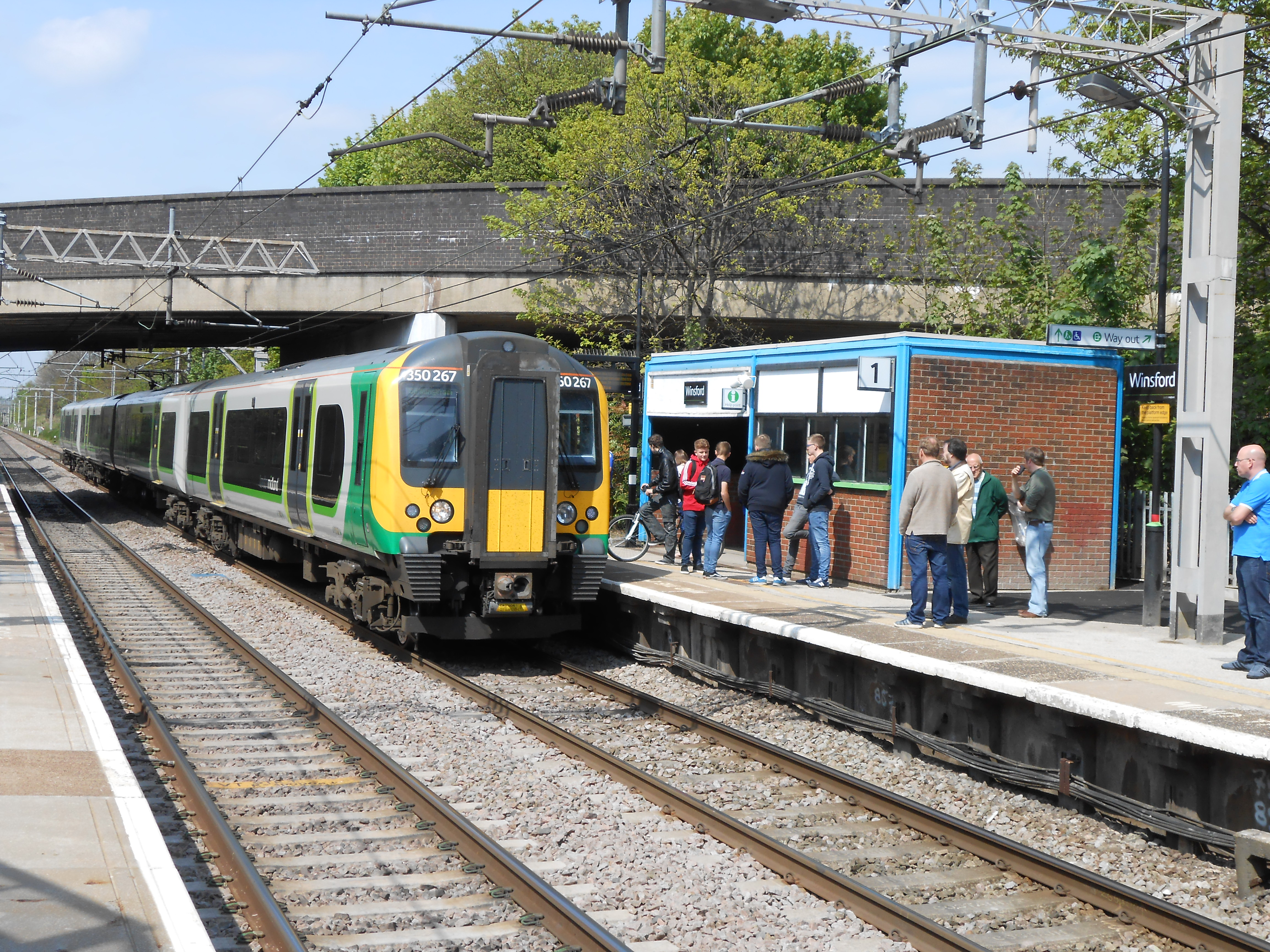

General information
- Location: Winsford, Cheshire West and Chester; England
- Grid reference: SJ670660
- Managed by: London Northwestern Railway
- Platforms: 2

Other information
- Station code: WSF
- Classification: DfT category F1

Passengers
- 2020/21: ▼57,782
- 2021/22: ▲0.166 million
- 2022/23: ▲0.174 million
- 2023/24: ▲0.201 million
- 2024/25: ▲0.215 million
Location
Notes
- Passenger statistics from the Office of Rail and Road

Winsford railway station serves the town of Winsford, in Cheshire, England. It is a stop on the West Coast Main Line, sited 7 1/2 miles (12 km) north of Crewe.

== History ==
The station was opened in 1837 on the Grand Junction Railway.

There have been two serious rail collisions near Winsford; the first in 1948 killed 24 and the second in 1962 killed 18.

== Facilities ==
Winsford station was upgraded in winter 2010. The upgrade included the installation of help points and electronic arrival/departure boards on the platforms, as well as a departure monitor in the main building.

The ticket office is staffed from 07:00 to 12:00 on Mondays through Thursdays, 07:00 to 15:00 on Fridays and Saturdays, and is closed on Sundays. Outside of these hours, there is a ticket machine available, which can also be used to collect tickets purchased in advance. Though the footbridge linking the platforms has stairs, step-free access is available to both via local roads.

== Services ==
The station is managed by London Northwestern Railway, which provides services between Birmingham New Street and Liverpool Lime Street. Trains call hourly in each direction throughout the week, except Sunday mornings, with a few extra calls at weekday peak times.

Preceding station	National Rail	Following station
Hartford towards Liverpool Lime Street	London Northwestern Railway Birmingham–Liverpool	Crewe towards Birmingham New Street
Historical Railways
Minshull Vernon	London and North Western Railway; Grand Junction Railway	Hartford
