= ICI Winnington Railway =

Disused train line

The ICI Winnington Railway is a former ICI Railway made for transporting goods into Winnington Soda Ash Works.

== Early Days ==
The line was formed in 1873 to transport Limestone to John Brunner and Ludwig Mond's Soda Ash Works (Brunner Mond). The limestone hoppers were carried by LMS Stanier Class 8Fs from Turnstead Sidings in Buxton to the goods depot in Winnington, near Victoria Infirmary.

== ICI Days ==
Ludwig Mond and John Brunner eventually formed Imperial Chemical Industries. In 1955, ICI owned 142 locomotives, 3,330 mainline rail wagons of which 2,600 were used within its works nationally and 260 miles of sidings. British Rail Class 08s carried wagons around the yard.

== Incidents On The Railway ==
October 7, 1948 (Hartford East Junction Collision): A locomotive collided with a limestone train due to a signalman/driver misunderstanding near Hartford East, requiring breakdown cranes to re-rail rolling stock.

May 13, 1966 (Runaway wagon/Derailment): A section of heavy wagons broke free, rolling into an oncoming train, causing the locomotive (D322) to be ripped apart, catch fire, and resulting in fatalities in the cab.

March 2006 (Mine Stabilization Derailment): A locomotive shunting pulverised ash derailed, colliding with a brine tanker and goods wagon; the driver was treated for shock, and the Health and Safety Executive investigated.

== Recent Years ==
The railway shut down in 2014 with the last hoppers being delivered by a British Rail Class 60. In 2019, the Curvey Weaver Railtour ran along the railway for excited trainspotters to see. The line remains there and is preserved as an emergency runoff if there was an incident on the Mid-Cheshire line. The goods depot is overgrown but can still be seen from Winnington Lane Bridge next to the pub 'The Lodge'. Hopper trains still occasionally go to Lostock Works in Lostock Gralam.
