= The Winsford Academy =

Location
- Grange Lane; Winsford, Cheshire, CW7 2BT; England; 53.195104°N 2.535900°W

Information
- Other name: Winsford Academy
- Former name: The Winsford E-ACT Academy
- Type: Academy
- Motto: Dream Learn Trust Succeed
- Established: 1895 (as Verdin Technical School); 1906 (as Verdin Higher Elementary School); 1920 (as Verdin Central School); 1925 (as Verdin County Secondary School); 1935 (as Verdin County Grammar School); 1970 (as Verdin County Comprehensive School); 1971 (Woodford Lodge County Comprehensive School was established); 1987 (as Verdin County High School); 2008 (as Winsford High School Federation); 2010 (as The Winsford E-ACT Academy)
- Founder: Amalgamation
- Local authority: Cheshire West and Chester
- Trust: The Fallibroome Trust
- Department for Education URN: 136184 Tables
- Ofsted: Reports
- Chair Governor: Joanne Watkins
- Principal: Emma-Jane McLaren
- Gender: Mixed
- Age range: 11–16
- Enrollment: 1,144
- Capacity: 1,700
- Houses: Britten, Purcell, Elgar, Sullivan
- Colour: Blue Red Green Yellow
- Slogan: Dream Learn Trust Succeed
- Publication: Newsletters and bulletins
- Website: www.winsfordacademy.org.uk

The Winsford Academy (simply referred to as Winsford Academy and formerly The Winsford E-ACT Academy) is an 11–16 mixed secondary school with academy status in Winsford, Cheshire, England. It was established in September 2010 following the amalgamation of the two predecessor schools; Verdin High School and Woodford Lodge High School. It is located on the campus of the former Verdin High School on Grange Lane that was established in 1970 and was initially one component of a two-campus school, with history spanning from its original founding as Verdin Technical School in 1895.

In September 2013, the academy moved into a new, £20 million purpose-built school which includes 60 classrooms with flexible learning spaces; a 400-seat theatre in the Performing Arts Centre; Learning Resource Centre; sports facilities; science labs; drama and dance studios; music rehearsal rooms; media suites; art studios; technology workshops; and a Sixth Form Centre (formally). In addition to this, the academy has spent £1.7 million on ICT.

== History ==
The Winsford Academy was established in September 2010 following the amalgamation of the two predecessor schools; Verdin High School and Woodford Lodge High School.

=== Verdin Era: 1895–2008 ===
The Verdin Era spans from 1895 to 2008 and partially to 2010 – all name changes to the school retained the term 'Verdin' from its original founders; The Verdin Family. The school was initially known to residents of Winsford as the 'Tec', but later the term 'Verdin' was used to refer to the school.

==== Origins ====
During the 1890s, there was a growing demand for technical education and an attempt was made by William Henry Verdin to convert Darnhall School into a science and technical school, but his plan was rejected in 1893.

Sir Joseph Verdin and his brothers, Robert and William ran a family salt business known as Joseph Verdin & Sons, by 1881 the largest salt manufacturer in the United Kingdom. Having few descendants, they used their wealth to benefit the local community.

In 1889, The Verdin Trust was established by Sir Joseph Verdin to compensate people for subsidence caused by brine pumping. However, from 1891 the Brine Pumping (Compensation for Subsidence) Act 1891 (54 & 55 Vict. c. 40) provided compensation for owners of property, thereby rendering the Trust redundant. As a result, Sir Joseph Verdin decided to use the money in other ways, including the construction and development of the Verdin Technical Schools in Winsford and Northwich – the one in Winsford, known as Verdin Technical School, was a prototype for a second and larger one in Northwich, that eventually opened in 1897 as Verdin Technical Schools & Gymnasium (latterly in use as Cheshire School of Art and Design, which closed in 2012).

The Verdin Technical School in Winsford was located adjacent to the Over Board School near the junction of High Street and Grange Lane. The building design was decided via a 'best design' competition that was won by Messrs Woodhouse and Willoughby, Architects, of Manchester. Building work, by Messrs James Fowles and Sons, of Winsford, began with an inscribed foundation stone – still visible on the building – being laid down on 4 August 1894 by William Henry Verdin, Joseph's brother. On 8 August 1895, the building was officially opened by the Duke and Duchess of Westminster.

==== Verdin Technical School: 1895–1906 ====
The Verdin Technical School opened on 9 September 1895 enrolling 43 students on the first day. It housed four separate, but overlapping institutions, consisting of a day school, evening classes, gymnasium and a laundry. It "grew slowly at first before gaining a reputation throughout the years as one of the most enterprising in Cheshire".

=== Woodford Lodge: 1971–2008 ===
Woodford Lodge High School (initially Woodford Lodge County Comprehensive School and Woodford Lodge County High School) was established in 1971 on a 30-acre site in the outskirts of Winsford, when it was a developing town with an increasing population.

Cheshire was the first county to offer careers guidance via computer from September 1973 to June 1974. It was run with the IBM UK Scientific Centre, at two schools, Ellesmere Port Grammar School and the school at Winsford.

Its name remained until 2008 and partially to 2010.

=== Federation: 2008–2010 ===
In 2007 Cheshire County Council undertook an extensive review of educational provision and surplus places under the Transforming Learning Communities Programme. The outcome was to Federate Verdin High School and Woodford Lodge High School from January 2008, under the name 'Winsford High School Federation'. The Federation was led and managed by a Principal and a single Governing Body of 21 Governors. Both schools had a site headteacher and senior managers were appointed to the Federation, however, most aspects of provision were managed on one site.

On 19 April 2008, Martin Howlett was appointed Principal of the new school federation, while the two site headteachers were Paul Harrington for Verdin High School and John Foreman for Woodford Lodge High School.

While both schools retained their names and uniforms, under the Federation Verdin High School was known as 'Verdin Site' and Woodford Lodge High School was known as 'Woodford Site'. The Federation had its own logo as well as two identical logos with the site names underneath to represent both schools.

=== Academy: September 2010–present ===
==== Proposal ====
In March 2010, Cheshire West and Chester Council announced that from September 2010 the two Federated schools would close to make way for an Academy to serve the Winsford area. A new building was planned that could accommodate 1,700 students to be built on a site behind the Verdin Exchange. There would be a 6 week public consultation on the proposal.

On 5 July 2010, the Cheshire West and Chester Council confirmed the new Academy would operate from 1 September 2010, subject to the agreement of the Education Secretary. It was to be known as the Winsford E-ACT Academy, making the two school names and the Federation redundant, and initially operating from the two existing school sites.

==== Opening ====
The Winsford E-ACT Academy opened on 6 September 2010 with Andrew Kilpatrick as the Interim Principal, after the Education Secretary, agreed to education sponsor E-ACT having responsibility for the academy. The new school specialised in music and mathematics.

==== New build ====
In December 2010 it was announced that a new £20 million school building would be built on the Verdin site, providing 1,500 places for students aged 11–16, with 200 spaces for post-16 students, to be completed by September 2013. From September 2011, the West Site (former Woodford Lodge building) closed, with all students educated at the Town Site (former Verdin High School building) until the proposed new building was completed. With planning permission granted, the building started in April 2012. It was completed on schedule in August 2013, and was open to students in September 2013. The old Verdin building was then closed, demolished and landscaped.

In March 2011, Andrew Taylor-Edwards, the Vice Principal since September 2010, was appointed as Principal of the Academy.

==== Change of sponsor ====
In February 2014, it was announced that the academy was among ten Academies to be handed back to the Government amid concerns over the E-ACT chain's standards. From 1 September 2014 the academy was sponsored by The Fallibroome Multi-Academy Trust in Macclesfield. As a result, minor changes were made to the school name and logo with the removal of the word 'E-ACT'.

==== Closure of Sixth Form ====
The Academy closed Sixth Form provision for new students from September 2016, and reverted to being an 11–16 school. Mr Andrew Taylor-Edwards, Principal told the Chester Chronicle that "while the proportion of students opting to stay on for Sixth Form study has remained constant, recent cuts to funding have put increasing pressure on the financial viability of providing our small post-16 provision".

== Motto ==
The Winsford Academy's motto is "Succeed, Aspire, Learn Together" and its acronym makes the word 'SALT', which is based upon the towns mining heritage and The Verdin Family who founded the Verdin Technical School in 1895 that developed into the present Academy. They owned six salt plants in various locations throughout Cheshire and was the largest salt manufacturer in the United Kingdom by 1881.

== Curriculum ==
The Winsford Academy's subjects include syllabuses for Key Stage 3 and Key Stage 4:

- English
- Mathematics
- Science (Science, Biology, Physics, and Chemistry)
- Performing Arts (Drama, Music, and Dance)
- ICT & Business (ICT, Computing, and Business Studies)
- Humanities (Geography, History, Leisure & Tourism, Religious Education (RE), and Sociology)
- Physical Education (PE)
- Modern Foreign Languages (MFL – French and Spanish)
- Health Studies (Child Development, Food & Nutrition, Food Studies, Health & Social Care, Hospitality & Catering, Psychology, and Children's Play, Learning & Development)
- Design & Technology (D&T) (Art, Construction, Engineering, Photography, Product Design, Media Studies, and Textiles)

== Leadership ==
A comprehensive restructure and rightsizing of the teaching and support staff was completed in August 2015 and a new organisation model was introduced to simplify the school structure and increase accountability for subject leadership. The leadership group comprises a Principal; two Vice Principals (Curriculum & Standards and Care, Support & Guidance) and seven Assistant Principals (Science & Technology, English, Maths, Achievement & Intervention, Sixth Form, Enrichment & Engagement, Humanities & SMSC). There are 60 teaching staff, including the leadership team.

== Pastoral system ==
The Winsford Academy has a pastoral system which consists of the five Year Heads and four Progress Managers. Through the Heads of Year team, students are provided with pastoral care and support with services such as child welfare, attendance support, mentoring and counselling all being available throughout the academy day. Students also have access to their Coach, Head of Year and Progress Manager. The Progress Managers are responsible for progress tracking, engagement and enrichment, and competition of the House System.

== House system ==
The Winsford Academy has a house system consisting of four 'Houses', which, as a specialism of Performing Arts and a specialist music school, are named after English composers; Britten (Benjamin Britten), Purcell (Henry Purcell), Elgar (Edward Elgar) and Sullivan (Arthur Sullivan). Depending on what House each student is in determines the colour of their tie and blazer trim for prefects. Britten are recognised in blue; Purcell red; Elgar green; and Sullivan yellow.

Each House is structured vertically to include coaching groups from all Years 7 to 13. Within each coaching group all pupils belong to the same House. Coaches are placed in the same House as their coaching group. Teachers without coaching responsibilities will also belong to a House team.

== Specialist school ==
Performing Arts is the main specialism of The Winsford Academy, in addition to being a Specialist Music School. The two predecessor schools; Verdin High School had a specialism in Technology that was attained via sponsorship by The Ogden Trust, and Woodford Lodge High School had no specialism.

== Sponsor ==
The Winsford Academy is sponsored by The Fallibroome Multi-Academy Trust in Macclesfield.

== Governing body ==
The Winsford Academy has a Governing Body and its Committees meet at least three times per half-term and convene as ad hoc Committees dealing with a wide range of academy business, and are a regular presence in the academy.

== Facilities ==
The Winsford Academy moved into a new school in September 2013.

The Facilities include:

- A 400-seat studio theatre with open stage, raked, retractable seating and full audio visual capability. The theatre also has a giant screen and projector
- A drama studio (black box studio) that backs onto the studio theatre, separated by a dividing moveable wall to allow for larger expansion to the stage area
- A dance studio with professionally equipped wooden sprung floor, full-length mirror with bar and air conditioning. A sound system is also available on request
- A fully equipped gymnasium
- A five-court sports hall including full-size basketball court, five badminton courts, cricket nets, and a five-a-side football court
- A large field with 5 football pitches, 6 tennis courts, a rugby pitch, a running track and a floodlit 3G all-weather pitch
- Two tarmac Multi-Use Games Areas marked for tennis and netball and is also suitable for basketball and fitness groups. Tennis, netball and basketball nets are available

== Partnerships ==
The Winsford Academy has established a range of partnerships. These are:

- Winsford Education Partnership
- Winsford Town Council
- Cheshire West and Chester
- Cheshire Constabulary
- University of Chester
- British Council
- England Rugby
- Rugby Football Foundation (with Prince Harry as its Patron)
- Microsoft IT Academy (ITA)
- Vale Royal School Sport Partnership
- The Hive
- Camps International
- Weaver Vale Housing Trust
- Teacher Development Trust
- Hugh O'Brian Youth Leadership (HOBY) – UK
- Royal Horticultural Society (RHS)
- Sale Sharks
- Darnhall Community
- Whole Education
- Incredible Edible Network – Winsford
- Over Allotments and Leisure Gardeners' Association
- The PiXL Club
- Dingle Recreation Centre
- Barrington Stoke Young Editors
- Cheshire Library Service
- The Duke of Edinburgh's Award
- UK Youth Parliament (UKYP)
- The Transformation Trust
- Springboard FutureChef
- Quality Learning Partners
- TEDx
- The Royal Cheshire County Show
- Premier League Reading Stars

== Notable alumni ==
Verdin Technical School

- Gertrude Maud Robinson (née Walsh), organic chemist
- E. T. Whitehead, political activist

Verdin County Grammar School

- Malcolm Arnold OBE, athletics coach
- Janet Dean (née Gibson), Labour MP for Burton 1997–2010
- Jim Walker, professional footballer and physiotherapist
- Geoff Barnett, professional footballer

Verdin County Comprehensive School

- David Hanson, Baron Hanson of Flint, Labour MP for Delyn 1992–2019, now a member of the House of Lords

Verdin High School

- Conrad Ellis, co-founder, lead vocalist and guitarist in rock band, The Luka State

Woodford Lodge High School

- Sam Bell, co-founder and bassist in rock band, The Luka State and actor

The Winsford Academy

- Charlie Kirk, professional footballer
