= Sir John Brunner, 2nd Baronet =

British Liberal Party politician

John Brunner
- Photograph of Brunner
- Born: Sir John Fowler Leece Brunner, 2nd Baronet; 24 May 1865
- Died: 16 January 1929 (aged 63)
- Political party: Liberal
- Spouse: Lucy Marianne Vaughan Morgan
- Children: Joyce, Felix
- Father: Sir John Brunner, 1st Baronet

Sir John Fowler Leece Brunner, 2nd Baronet (24 May 1865 – 16 January 1929) was a British Liberal Party politician.

== Biography ==
Brunner was the eldest son of industrialist Sir John Tomlinson Brunner. On 8 September 1890 John got into difficulties whilst swimming in Lake Como, Italy. He was rescued by his younger brother, Sidney Herbert Brunner, who died in the process. Sidney's body was found on 10 September and buried beside the lake the next day.

=== Career ===
John was elected at the 1906 general election as Member of Parliament (MP) for Leigh in Lancashire, serving on the Liberal benches with his father, MP for Northwich in Cheshire.

When his father retired from Parliament at the January 1910 election, he was elected to succeed him as MP for Northwich, and held the seat until his defeat at the 1918 general election. On his father's death in 1919, he succeeded to the baronetcy.

He unsuccessfully contested the Southport seat at the 1922 general election, and won it at the 1923 general election, but was defeated again at the 1924 general election.

He stood again at the 1928 Cheltenham by-election, but came a poor second in the Conservative safe seat.

He was President of Manchester College, Oxford (now named Harris Manchester College) from 1928-1929.

== Marriage and family ==
He married Lucy Marianne Vaughan Morgan (1871–1941), daughter of Octavius Vaughan Morgan (1837–1896), and granddaughter of Thomas Morgan of Pipton, near Glasbury, Breconshire (1796–1847). Their daughter Joyce Morgan Brunner married Sir William Worsley, 4th Baronet, and their granddaughter Katharine married Prince Edward, Duke of Kent, thereby becoming Her Royal Highness The Duchess of Kent. Their son Felix succeeded as the 3rd baronet upon the death of Sir John, age 63.

== Notes ==
Parliament of the United Kingdom
Preceded by C.P. Scott	Member of Parliament for Leigh; 1906–1910	Succeeded by Peter Raffan
Preceded by Sir John Brunner, Bt	Member of Parliament for Northwich; 1910–1918	Succeeded by Harry Dewhurst
Preceded by Godfrey Dalrymple-White	Member of Parliament for Southport; 1923–1924	Succeeded by Godfrey Dalrymple-White
Baronetage of the United Kingdom
Preceded by John Brunner	Baronet of Druids Cross, Lancashire; 1919–1929	Succeeded by Felix Brunner
