= Lord Colum Crichton-Stuart =

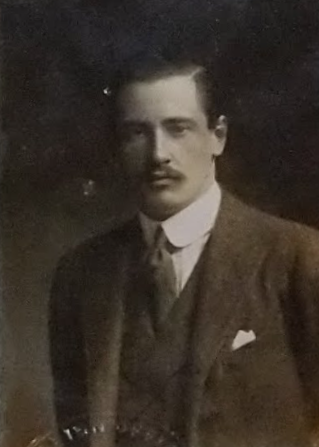
© The Bute Archive at Mount Stuart

Lord Colum Edmund Crichton-Stuart (KM, MP) was born on 3 April 1886 and died 18 August 1957, aged 71. Lord Colum Edmund Crichton-Stuart, who was baptised as Columba, was the fourth child of John Patrick Crichton-Stuart, 3rd Marquess of the County of Bute (d. 1900) and the Hon. Gwendolen Mary Anne Fitzalan-Howard (d. 1932). He married Elizabeth Caroline Petty-Fitzmaurice, Marchioness of Lansdowne (widow of Henry William Edmund [Petty-Fitzmaurice] 6th Marquess of Lansdowne; d. 25 March 1964) and the only daughter of Sir Edward Stanley Hope KCB and Constance C. Leslie. Lord Colum was educated at Harrow and Christ Church, Oxford University, England.

Lord Colum entered into the diplomatic service, nominated an Attaché, on 11 June 1910. Passed a competitive examination on 18 February 1911. Appointed to Cairo on 28 October 1911, he was later appointed an attacheship at the British Consulate-General in Cairo working under Lord Kitchener. He was a Gold Staff Officer at the Coronation of King George V, 1911 receiving the Coronation Medal. Granted an allowance for knowledge of Arabic on 26 June 1912 (he was a master of seven languages). Promoted to be a 3rd Secretary on 10 May 1913. Transferred to the Foreign Office on 11 November 1914, and to Christiania (Denmark) on 11 May 1916. Again transferred to the Foreign Office on 30 September 1916. Promoted to be a 2nd Secretary on 1 April 1919. Resigned on 1 May 1919.

Lord Colum stood for election in Cardiff East in December 1918, a seat once held by his brother Lord Ninian, losing to William Seager. Lord Colum's position in the civil service ended in 1920 he later served as Member of Parliament for the Northwich constituency in Cheshire from 1922 to 1945. In 1945, Lord Colum bestowed Pluscarden Priory in Moray, Scotland over to the Benedictine community at Prinknash Abbey in Gloucestershire, for use as a daughter house. He held the office of Lord-Lieutenant of Bute between 1953 and 1957.

He collapsed and died in 1957 while attending a service of Mass at St. Andrew's Roman Catholic Church at Rothesay.

Parliament of the United Kingdom
Preceded by Harry Dewhurst	Member of Parliament for Northwich; 1922 – 1945	Succeeded by Sir John Galway Foster
Honorary titles
Preceded by The Duke of Montrose	Lord Lieutenant of Buteshire; 1953 – 1957	Succeeded by Lord Robert Crichton-Stuart
