= Sir Joseph Verdin, 1st Baronet =

Sir Joseph Verdin, 1st Bt Bt JP DL
- Born: Joseph Verdin; 4 January 1838; Witton, Northwich, Cheshire, England
- Died: 28 December 1920 (aged 82); Garnstone Castle, Weobley, Herefordshire, England
- Occupation: Salt industrialist
- Title: Baronet
- Parents: Joseph Verdin; Margaret Sadler

Escutcheon of the Verdin baronets of the Brocklehurst and Wimboldsley

Sir Joseph Verdin, 1st Baronet, JP, DL (4 January 1838 – 28 December 1920) was a British salt industrialist, philanthropist and the Justice of the Peace, Deputy Lieutenant and County Alderman for the County of Cheshire. He was elevated to the Baronetage on 24 July 1896 and knighted in 1897. He later became Justice of the Peace for Herefordshire and High Sheriff in 1903.

== Personal life ==
Joseph Verdin was born in Witton, Northwich, Cheshire on 4 January 1838 and lived at The Brockhurst, a Regency house in spacious grounds at Leftwich, Northwich, Cheshire with his brother Robert and sister Mary. He was a prominent figure in Northwich's affairs and was a Justice of the Peace, Deputy Lieutenant and County Alderman for Cheshire. He was elevated to the Baronetage on 24 July 1896 and knighted in 1897. When the Salt Union was formed in 1888 resulted in an end to his family salt business. Joseph continued to live in Cheshire for a while but brought Garnstone Castle in Weobley, Herefordshire and eventually moved there with his sister Mary in 1900. He then became a Justice of the Peace for Herefordshire and High Sheriff in 1903. He was unmarried like his brother Robert and died at Garnstone Castle on 28 December 1920.

== Verdin & Sons ==
Sir Joseph Verdin and his brothers, Robert and William ran a family salt business known as Joseph Verdin & Sons (formerly Joseph and Richard Verdin), co-founded by their father, Joseph and his brother, Richard. They owned six salt plants in various locations throughout Cheshire, including Marston, Witton, Moulton, Over, Wharton and Middlewich. They employed over 1,000 people and produced approximately 353,000 tons of salt annually; it was the largest salt manufacturer in the United Kingdom by 1881. Having few descendants, they used their wealth to benefit the local community; they gave the Institute in Moulton which "provided facilities for the education of their workforce", the Victoria Infirmary (presented by Robert) and Verdin Park in Northwich. In Winsford, they provided the Albert Infirmary (formerly Highfield House, the home of The Verdin Family) which was presented by William and the first public swimming baths known as Verdin Baths; built to commemorate Queen Victoria's Golden Jubilee in 1887 and was funded by Joseph and William.

=== Subsidence and the Verdin Trust ===
During the 1880s, salt production was thriving, but due to the increased pumping of brine from beneath the ground led to huge problems of subsidence, particularly in Winsford and Northwich. Fields sank, roads cracked and houses slipped leading to costly repairs. People whose property was affected sought compensation, but the difficulty arose in identifying who was to blame, as pumping can affect an area several miles away.

Brine Pumping (Compensation for Subsidence) Act 1891 (Note: Section 1.)
- Act of Parliament
- Parliament of the United Kingdom
- Long title: An Act to provide Compensation for Owners of Property-suffering through the Subsidence of the Ground caused by the pumping of Brine.
- Citation: 54 & 55 Vict. c. 40
- Territorial extent: England and Wales (Note: Section 2.)

Dates
- Royal assent: 28 July 1891
- Commencement: 28 July 1891 (Note: The Acts of Parliament (Commencement) Act 1793.)
- Repealed: 8 November 1995

Other legislation
- Amended by: Charities Act 1960; Courts Act 1971
- Repealed by: Statute Law (Repeals) Act 1995

Status: Repealed

Text of statute as originally enacted

Revised text of statute as amended

In 1889, the Verdin Trust was established by Sir Joseph Verdin to compensate people for subsidence caused by brine pumping. Later, the Brine Pumping (Compensation for Subsidence) Act 1891 (54 & 55 Vict. c. 40) was introduced to provide compensation for owners of property, rendering the trust redundant.

=== Benefactor ===
Verdin turned to other uses of his money, including the construction and development of the Verdin Technical Schools in Winsford and Northwich. Winsford's Verdin Technical School (forerunner of The Winsford Academy) was a prototype for a second and larger one in Northwich, that opened in 1897 as Verdin Technical Schools & Gymnasium (latterly in use as Cheshire School of Art and Design, which closed in 2012). Some money was used to endow the two schools and the remainder was to be used by the Trustees to "provide for technical and manual instruction and the establishment and maintenance of gymnasiums, infirmaries, hospitals, museums, or other charitable institutions] of a like character".

== See also ==
- Robert Verdin
- The Winsford Academy
- Listed buildings in Winsford
- Listed buildings in Northwich

== Notes ==
Honorary titles
Preceded by George William Marshall	High Sheriff of Herefordshire; 1903	Succeeded by William Theodore Barneby
Baronetage of the United Kingdom
New creation	Baronet (of the Brocklehurst and Wimboldsley); 1896–1920	Extinct
Preceded by McIver baronets	Verdin baronets of the Brocklehurst and Wimboldsley; 24 July 1896	Succeeded by Uniacke-Penrose-Fitzgerald baronets
