= NeuroMuscular Centre =

The NeuroMuscular Centre (NMC) is a charity and centre based in Winsford, Cheshire, England that provides support for sufferers of muscular dystrophy. It was established in 1989 and in 2013 had 700 registered patients.

The centre costs £850,000 a year to run and is funded by charitable donations. In 2013, the centre moved into new premises previously occupied by Woodford Lodge High School.
