= Brunner baronets =

Baronetcy in the Baronetage of the United Kingdom

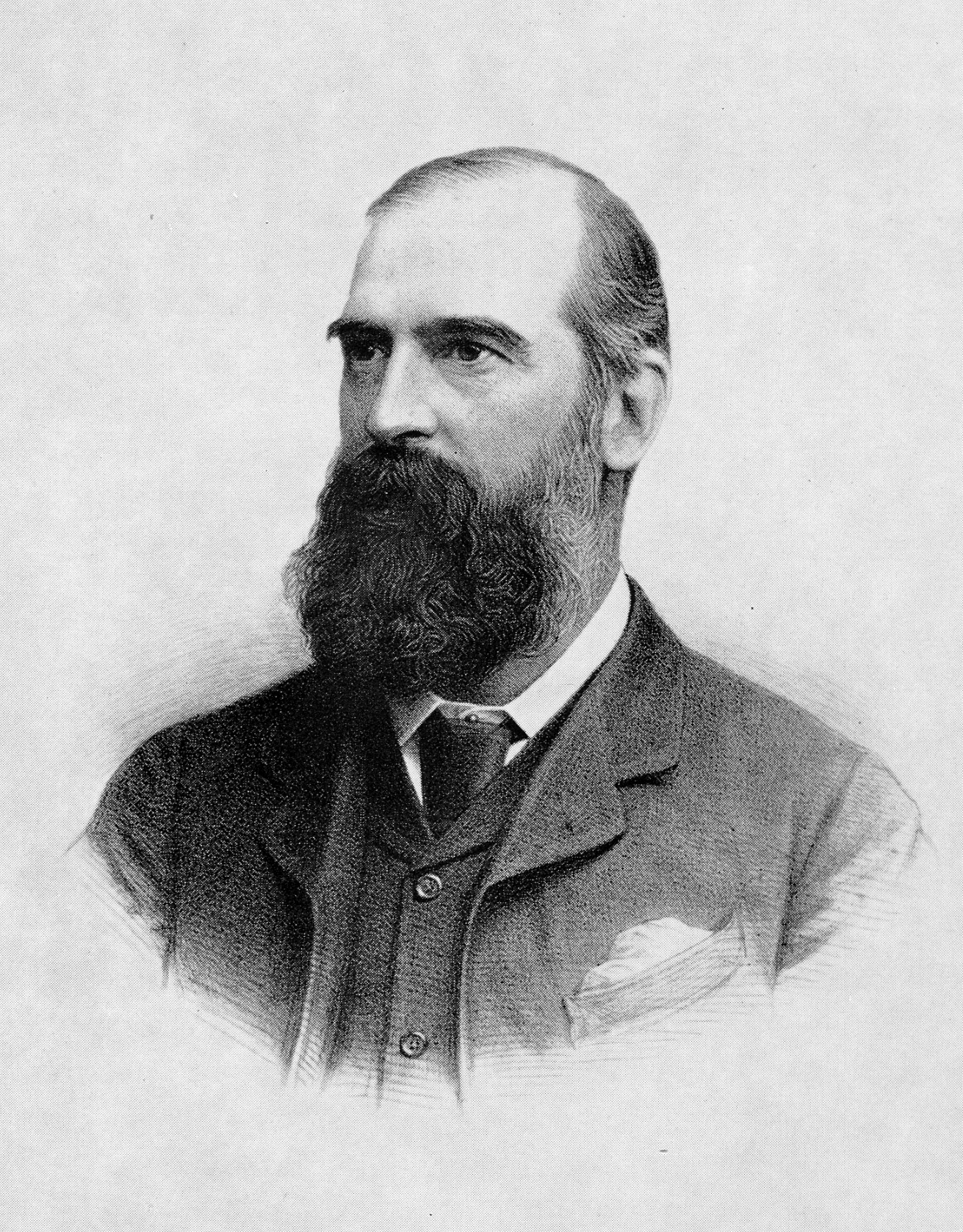
Sir John Brunner, 1st Baronet

The Brunner baronetcy, of Druids Cross in the parish of Little Woolton in the County Palatine of Lancaster; of Winnington Old Hall in the parish of Winnington in the County Palatine of Chester; and of Ennismore Gardens in the parish of St Margaret's, Westminster in the County of London, is a title in the Baronetage of the United Kingdom. It was created on 27 July 1895 for the industrialist, politician and philanthropist John Brunner. He was the second son of Rev. John Brunner, of Zürich and Liverpool Switzerland.

The 2nd and 3rd Baronets were also politicians.

== Brunner baronets, of Druids Cross, Winnington Old Hall and Ennismore Gardens (1895) ==
- Sir John Tomlinson Brunner, 1st Baronet (1842–1919)
- Sir John Fowler Leece Brunner, 2nd Baronet (1865–1929)
- Sir Felix John Morgan Brunner, 3rd Baronet (1897–1982)
- Sir John Henry Kilian Brunner, 4th Baronet (1927–2015)
- Sir Nicholas Felix Minturn Brunner, 5th Baronet (born 1960)

The heir presumptive is the present holder's brother Mark Jonathan Irving Brunner (born 1962).

== Extended family ==
Katharine, Duchess of Kent was a great-granddaughter of the 1st Baronet, as daughter of Joyce Morgan Brunner, daughter of the 2nd Baronet. Her birth name was Katharine Lucy Mary Worsley, and her father was Sir William Worsley, 4th Baronet.

Baronetage of the United Kingdom
Preceded by Watson baronets	Brunner baronets of Druids Cross, Winnington Old Hall and Ennismore Gardens; 27 July 1895	Succeeded by Dunn baronets
