= Northwich (constituency) =

Parliamentary constituency in the United Kingdom, 1885–1983

- Former county constituency for the House of Commons
- Boundary of Northwich in Cheshire, boundaries 1974–1983
- County: Cheshire

1885–1983
- Seats: one
- Created from: Mid Cheshire and West Cheshire
- Replaced by: Eddisbury and Tatton

Northwich was a constituency in Cheshire which returned one Member of Parliament (MP) to the House of Commons of the Parliament of the United Kingdom from 1885 until it was abolished for the 1983 general election.

== History ==
Northwich was first created as one of eight single-member divisions of Cheshire under the Redistribution of Seats Act 1885.

It was abolished following the reorganisation of local authorities in 1974 by the Third Periodic Review of Westminster constituencies for the 1983 general election, when it was divided roughly equally between the re-established constituency of Eddisbury and the new constituency of Tatton.

== Boundaries ==
1885–1918: The Sessional Division of Runcorn, and parts of the Sessional Divisions of Eddisbury, Leftwich and Northwich.

Comprised the towns of Runcorn, Northwich, Winsford and Middlewich, and surrounding rural areas.

1918–1950: The Urban Districts of Middlewich, Northwich, Runcorn, Sandbach and Winsford, and parts of the Rural Districts of Congleton, Northwich and Runcorn.

Sandbach transferred from Crewe.

1950–1955: The Urban Districts of Middlewich, Northwich and Winsford, and the Rural Districts of Northwich and Tarvin.

Gained the Rural District of Tarvin from the additional parts of the Rural District of Northwich from the abolished constituency of Eddisbury. Sandbach and the part of the Rural District of Congleton transferred to Knutsford, and Runcorn (including the part of the rural district thereof) transferred to the new constituency of Runcorn.

1955–1983: The Urban District of Northwich, and parts of the Rural Districts of Northwich and Tarvin.

Middlewich, Winsford, the southern part of the Rural District of Tarvin and a small part of the Rural District of Northwich transferred to the new constituency of Nantwich.

From 1 April 1974 until the constituency was abolished at the next boundary review which came into effect for the 1983 general election, the constituency was primarily situated in the newly formed District of Vale Royal, but its boundaries were unchanged.

On abolition, Northwich and eastern areas were included in the new constituency of Tatton. Cuddington, Weaverham and western areas included in the re-established constituency of Eddisbury.

== Members of Parliament ==
Election	Member	Party
1885	John Brunner	Liberal
1886	Robert Verdin	Liberal Unionist
1887 by-election	Sir John Brunner	Liberal
Jan 1910	Sir John Brunner II	Liberal
1918	Harry Dewhurst	Coalition Conservative
1922	Lord Colum Crichton-Stuart	Conservative
1945	Sir John Foster	Conservative
Feb 1974	Alastair Goodlad	Conservative
1983	constituency abolished	

== Elections ==
=== Elections in the 1880s ===
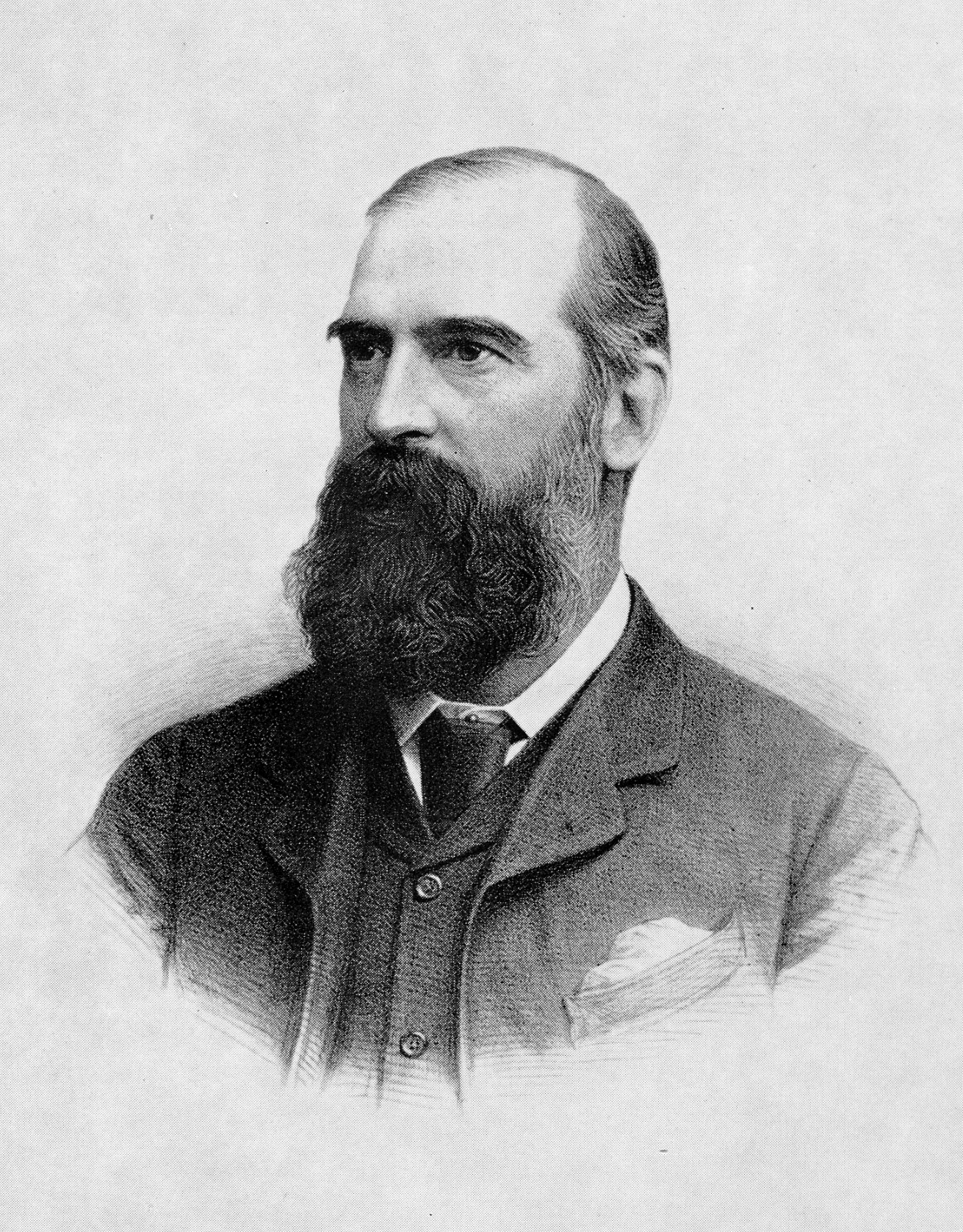
John Brunner

General election 1885: Northwich
Party	Candidate	Votes	%	±%
Liberal	John Brunner	5,023	55.7	
Conservative	William Henry Verdin	3,995	44.3	
Majority		1,028	11.4	
Turnout		9,018	85.3	
Registered electors		10,577		
Liberal win (new seat)				

General election 1886: Northwich
Party	Candidate	Votes	%	±%
Liberal Unionist	Robert Verdin	4,416	52.7	+8.4
Liberal	John Brunner	3,958	47.3	−8.4
Majority		458	5.4	N/A
Turnout		8,374	79.2	−6.1
Registered electors		10,577		
Liberal Unionist gain from Liberal		Swing	+8.4	

Verdin's death caused a by-election.

By-election, 13 Aug 1887: Northwich
Party	Candidate	Votes	%	±%
Liberal	John Brunner	5,112	56.2	+8.9
Liberal Unionist	Henry Grosvenor	3,983	43.8	−8.9
Majority		1,129	12.4	N/A
Turnout		9,095	83.7	+4.5
Registered electors		10,868		
Liberal gain from Liberal Unionist		Swing	+8.9	

=== Elections in the 1890s ===
George Whiteley

General election 1892: Northwich
Party	Candidate	Votes	%	±%
Liberal	John Brunner	5,580	56.3	+9.0
Conservative	George Whiteley	4,325	43.7	−9.0
Majority		1,255	12.6	N/A
Turnout		9,905	84.3	+5.1
Registered electors		11,750		
Liberal gain from Liberal Unionist		Swing	+9.0	

General election 1895: Northwich
Party	Candidate	Votes	%	±%
Liberal	John Brunner	5,706	58.4	+2.1
Conservative	Thomas Ward	4,068	41.6	−2.1
Majority		1,638	16.8	+4.2
Turnout		9,774	82.9	−1.4
Registered electors		11,788		
Liberal hold		Swing	+2.1	

=== Elections in the 1900s ===
General election 1900: Northwich
Party	Candidate	Votes	%	±%
Liberal	John Brunner	5,377	53.5	−4.9
Conservative	Charles Leopold Samson	4,678	46.5	+4.9
Majority		699	7.0	−9.8
Turnout		10,055	83.3	+0.4
Registered electors		12,067		
Liberal hold		Swing	−4.9	

General election 1906: Northwich
Party	Candidate	Votes	%	±%
Liberal	John Brunner	6,343	58.2	+4.7
Liberal Unionist	Bordrigge North	4,551	41.8	−4.7
Majority		1,792	16.4	+9.4
Turnout		10,894	87.0	+3.7
Registered electors		12,527		
Liberal hold		Swing	+4.7	

=== Elections in the 1910s ===
Brunner

General election January 1910: Northwich
Party	Candidate	Votes	%	±%
Liberal	John Brunner	6,661	54.6	−3.6
Liberal Unionist	Charles Williams	5,542	45.4	+3.6
Majority		1,119	9.2	−7.2
Turnout		12,203	91.1	+4.1
Registered electors		13,389		
Liberal hold		Swing	−3.6	

General election December 1910: Northwich
Party	Candidate	Votes	%	±%
Liberal	John Brunner	6,071	51.4	−3.2
Conservative	Julius John Jersey de Knoop	5,740	48.6	+3.2
Majority		331	2.8	−6.4
Turnout		11,811	88.2	−2.9
Registered electors		13,389		
Liberal hold		Swing	−3.2	

General Election 1914–15:

Another General Election was required to take place before the end of 1915. The political parties had been making preparations for an election to take place from 1914 and by the end of this year, the following candidates had been selected;

- Liberal: John Brunner
- Unionist: Julius John Jersey de Knoop

General election 1918: Northwich
Party		Candidate	Votes	%	±%
C	Unionist	Harry Dewhurst	15,444	61.4	+12.8
	Liberal	John Brunner	9,723	38.6	−12.8
Majority			5,721	22.8	N/A
Turnout			25,167	64.1	−24.1
	Unionist gain from Liberal		Swing	+12.8	
C indicates candidate endorsed by the coalition government.

=== Elections in the 1920s ===
General election 1922: Northwich
Party	Candidate	Votes	%	±%
Unionist	Colum Crichton-Stuart	15,454	54.2	−7.2
Labour	John Williams	13,066	45.8	New
Majority		2,388	8.4	−14.4
Turnout		28,520	71.6	+7.5
Unionist hold		Swing		

General election 1923: Northwich
Party	Candidate	Votes	%	±%
Unionist	Colum Crichton-Stuart	11,835	38.5	−15.7
Liberal	Arthur Mort	9,765	31.7	New
Labour	John Williams	9,183	29.8	−16.0
Majority		2,070	6.8	−1.6
Turnout		30,783	76.1	+4.5
Unionist hold		Swing		

General election 1924: Northwich
Party	Candidate	Votes	%	±%
Unionist	Colum Crichton-Stuart	14,545	43.2	+4.7
Labour	Barbara Ayrton-Gould	11,630	34.6	+4.8
Liberal	Arthur Mort	7,465	22.2	−9.5
Majority		2,915	8.6	+1.8
Turnout		33,640	80.7	+4.6
Unionist hold		Swing	0.0	

General election 1929: Northwich
Party	Candidate	Votes	%	±%
Unionist	Colum Crichton-Stuart	15,477	34.3	−8.9
Labour	Barbara Ayrton-Gould	15,473	34.3	−0.3
Liberal	John Barlow	14,163	31.4	+9.2
Majority		4	0.0	−8.6
Turnout		45,113	83.6	+2.9
Unionist hold		Swing	-4.3	

=== Elections in the 1930s ===
General election 1931: Northwich
Party	Candidate	Votes	%	±%
Conservative	Colum Crichton-Stuart	30,061	65.6	+31.3
Labour	Barbara Ayrton-Gould	15,746	34.4	+0.1
Majority		14,315	31.2	+31.2
Turnout		45,807	82.8	−3.8
Conservative hold		Swing		

General election 1935: Northwich
Party	Candidate	Votes	%	±%
Conservative	Colum Crichton-Stuart	24,316	54.5	−11.1
Labour	Thomas Reid	20,289	46.5	+12.1
Majority		4,027	9.0	−22.2
Turnout		44,605	77.9	−4.9
Conservative hold		Swing		

=== Elections in the 1940s ===
General Election 1939–40:

Another General Election was required to take place before the end of 1940. The political parties had been making preparations for an election to take place from 1939 and by the end of this year, the following candidates had been selected;

- Conservative: John Foster
- Labour: Robert Chorley
- Liberal: Felix Brunner

General election 1945: Northwich
Party	Candidate	Votes	%	±%
Conservative	John Foster	20,198	41.4	−13.1
Labour	Robert Chorley	20,183	41.3	−5.2
Liberal	Felix Brunner	8,460	17.3	New
Majority		15	0.1	−8.9
Turnout		48,841	78.1	−1.8
Conservative hold		Swing		

=== Elections in the 1950s ===
General election 1950: Northwich
Party	Candidate	Votes	%	±%
Conservative	John Foster	25,144	48.4	+7.0
Labour	Charles Mapp	19,886	38.2	−3.1
Liberal	Walter Norman Leak	6,989	13.4	−3.9
Majority		5,258	10.2	+10.1
Turnout		52,019	87.7	+9.6
Conservative hold		Swing		

General election 1951: Northwich
Party	Candidate	Votes	%	±%
Conservative	John Foster	29,375	56.8	+8.4
Labour	Robert Patrick Walsh	22,300	43.2	+5.0
Majority		7,075	13.6	+3.4
Turnout		51,675	83.7	−4.0
Conservative hold		Swing		

General election 1955: Northwich
Party	Candidate	Votes	%	±%
Conservative	John Foster	20,697	59.4	+2.6
Labour	Derek Page	14,142	40.6	−2.6
Majority		6,555	18.8	+5.2
Turnout		34,889	79.7	−4.0
Conservative hold		Swing		

General election 1959: Northwich
Party	Candidate	Votes	%	±%
Conservative	John Foster	20,396	54.5	−4.9
Labour	John Crawford	12,426	33.2	−7.4
Liberal	Richard Eric Lewis	4,602	12.3	New
Majority		7,970	21.3	+2.5
Turnout		37,424	84.5	+4.8
Conservative hold		Swing		

=== Elections in the 1960s ===
General election 1964: Northwich
Party	Candidate	Votes	%	±%
Conservative	John Foster	17,277	47.4	−7.1
Labour	John Crawford	12,892	35.3	+2.1
Liberal	Geoff Tordoff	6,331	17.3	New
Majority		4,385	12.1	−9.2
Turnout		36,500	83.0	−1.5
Conservative hold		Swing		

General election 1966: Northwich
Party	Candidate	Votes	%	±%
Conservative	John Foster	16,483	45.1	−2.3
Labour	Barry Jones	15,780	43.1	+7.8
Liberal	Douglas Bedford Taylor	4,310	11.8	−5.5
Majority		703	2.0	−10.1
Turnout		36,573	82.3	−0.7
Conservative hold		Swing		

=== Elections in the 1970s ===
General election 1970: Northwich
Party	Candidate	Votes	%	±%
Conservative	John Foster	20,366	51.3	+6.2
Labour	Alfred Bates	15,746	39.6	−3.5
Liberal	Thomas Noel Armstrong	3,604	9.1	−2.7
Majority		4,620	11.7	+9.7
Turnout		39,716	78.5	−3.8
Conservative hold		Swing		

General election February 1974: Northwich
Party	Candidate	Votes	%	±%
Conservative	Alastair Goodlad	19,778	45.36	
Labour Co-op	S. G. Benyon	13,485	30.92	
Liberal	R. Reaper	10,344	23.72	
Majority		6,293	14.44	
Turnout		43,607	83.68	
Conservative hold		Swing		

General election October 1974: Northwich
Party	Candidate	Votes	%	±%
Conservative	Alastair Goodlad	18,663	45.12	
Labour	Peter Kent	14,053	33.98	
Liberal	D Reaper	8,645	20.90	
Majority		4,610	11.14	
Turnout		41,361	78.59	
Conservative hold		Swing		

General election 1979: Northwich
Party	Candidate	Votes	%	±%
Conservative	Alastair Goodlad	23,201	52.77	
Labour	PA Kent	14,455	32.88	
Liberal	G Little	6,311	14.35	
Majority		8,746	19.89	
Turnout		43,967	80.88	
Conservative hold		Swing		

== See also ==
- History of parliamentary constituencies and boundaries in Cheshire
