= Fallibroome Academy =

The Fallibroome Academy

Location
- Priory Lane; Macclesfield, Cheshire, SK10 4AF; England; 53.271°N 2.160°W

Information
- Type: Academy
- Religious affiliation: mixed
- Established: 1978
- Local authority: Cheshire East
- Trust: The Halliard Trust (lead school)
- Specialist: Performing Arts
- Department for Education URN: 136278 Tables
- Ofsted: Reports
- Principal: Ross Martland
- Staff: 150+
- Gender: Mixed
- Age: 11 to 18
- Enrolment: 1500+
- Website: fallibroome.org.uk fallibroometrust.com

The Fallibroome Academy is a mixed secondary academy school in Macclesfield, Cheshire, England. It has approximately 1567 students, including around 365 in the sixth form. The school is a specialist performing arts college, leading edge, national training school and a national teaching school, equivalent to a teaching hospital. Fallibroome was opened as a purpose-built comprehensive school on the present site in September 1979. An Ofsted inspection report in 2022 rated the school as "Good".

Although only officially opened at its present location in 1980, during the academic year 1978-9 it operated from the old premises of the Wycliffe Avenue Secondary Modern School for Girls in Wilmslow as a 'stop gap' for a grammar school intake of 72 boys who were unable to be taken by King's School, Macclesfield.

In 2014 a new building was opened, housing a new sixth form centre and new canteen.

The school attracted headlines for its innovative "welcome video", which featured all students and staff in elaborate choreographed sequences.

== Design and technology department ==
The department won national competitions including Greenpower, Young Master Chef and the Audi Innovation award. The department shares its good practice by holding "professional development activities" for local schools and shares its resources via its own website.

The year groups start from year 7 (11–12) and go up to year 11 (15–16). After this stage the pupils either move on (e.g. start a different college or get a job) or stay on for years 12–13, which is also known as Sixth Form, for further education.

== Performing arts ==
Fallibroome is a performing arts college. Recent performances include Oh, What a Lovely War! in 2004, Les Misérables – Schools Edition in 2005, A Christmas Carol in 2006, Julius Caesar in 2007, Joseph and the Amazing Technicolor Dreamcoat in 2007, Oliver! in 2008, Happily Ever After in 2009, We Will Rock You in 2010, and Kinder Transport in 2011. In 2012, Les Miserables – Schools Edition was performed again, and Grease was performed in 2014. More recently, 'Chicago' was performed in 2021.

== The Halliard Trust (formerly The Fallibroome Trust) ==
The Fallibroome Academy was a converter academy and now is the lead school in the Halliard Trust (formerly The Fallibroome Trust). Other schools in the trust are Adlington Primary, Broken Cross Primary, Eaton Bank Academy, Gawsworth primary, Marlborough Primary School, Nether Alderley Primary, Whirley Primary, The Winsford Academy, and Upton Priory School.

== Notable alumni ==
- Ben Amos – professional footballer with Manchester United and Bolton Wanderers
- Menna Fitzpatrick - Paralympic alpine skier, most decorated British winter Paralympian
