= Velia Abdel-Huda =

Egyptian-British art historian and socialite

Princess Velia
- Born: Velia Abdel-Huda; 26 January 1916; Cairo, Sultanate of Egypt
- Died: 29 November 2012 (aged 96)
- Spouses: Prince Osman-Oglu
- House: Osmanoğlu
- Father: Tawfik Abu Al-Huda

Princess Velia Osman-Oglu, born as Velia Abdel-Huda, and more commonly referred to as Princess Lulie (26 January 1916 – 29 November 2012) was a British art historian and socialite. She was also notable for being the first Muslim woman to study at the University of Oxford.

== Early life ==
Abdel-Huda was born in Cairo, Egypt into a family of Turkish diplomats in exile, with long experience of service to the Ottoman Empire. Her grandfather was an adviser and astrologer to the last Ottoman Sultan and her father, Tawfik Abu Al-Huda, became Prime Minister of Transjordan.

She was educated at Lady Margaret Hall where she studied modern History and graduated in 1939. Consequently, Abdel-Huda was the first Muslim woman to study at the University of Oxford.

During the Second World War she was recruited by the British Information Services and was posted to Cairo and then Palestine where she was engaged with the Palestinian cause and began a lifelong friendship with Freya Stark. Abdel-Huda remained fervently pro-Palestinian freedom throughout her life, and considered the Palestinian people betrayed by the British.

Once the war was over, she studied Art History at the Courtauld Institute under Anthony Blunt, and resided in Chelsea, London.

== Personal life ==
In 1963 Abdel-Huda married her cousin, Prince Osman-Oglu. She also had a thirty-year relationship with the British MP Sir John Foster.

She was known for her sparkling dinner parties and her flamboyant personality.

Abdel-Huda died on 29 November 2012 in London, aged 96.
