= Watson baronets of Earnock (1895) =

Watson baronets
- Arms of the Watson baronets of Earnock
- Creation date: 1995
- Status: extinct
- Extinction date: 2017
- Motto: Insperata floruit, It has flourished beyond expectation
- Arms: Per pale Argent and Or, on a mount Vert an oak tree Proper, the whole surmounted by two bars Sable
- Crest: The stump of an oak tree with a branch sprouting from either side, each grasped by a hand issuing from a cloud all Proper.

The Watson baronetcy, of Earnock in the parish of Hamilton in the County of Lanark, was created in the Baronetage of the United Kingdom on 15 July 1895 for John Watson, a coalmaster and railway company director.

The 4th Baronet assumed by deed poll his given name of Inglefield as an additional surname in 1945. This surname was also borne by the 5th Baronet. The baronetcy became extinct on the death of the 7th baronet on 3 May 2016.

== Watson baronets, of Earnock (1895) ==
- Sir John Watson, 1st Baronet (1819–1898)
- Sir John Watson, 2nd Baronet (1860–1903)
- Sir John Watson, 3rd Baronet (1898–1918)
- Sir Derrick William Inglefield Inglefield-Watson, 4th Baronet (1901–1987)
- Sir John Forbes Inglefield-Watson, 5th Baronet (1926–2007)
- Sir Simon Conran Hamilton Watson, 6th Baronet (1939–2016)
- Sir Julian Frank Somerled Watson, 7th Baronet (1931–2016)

== Notes ==
Baronetage of the United Kingdom
Preceded by Dale baronets	Watson baronets of Earnock; 15 July 1895	Succeeded by Brunner baronets
