= 1887 Northwich by-election =

UK parliamentary by-election

The 1887 Northwich by-election was held on 13 August 1887 after the incumbent Liberal Unionist MP, Robert Verdin died.

The seat was retaken by the Liberal candidate John Tomlinson Brunner. Brunner had previously been the MP but lost the seat in the 1885 general election due to a split within the Liberal party over Irish Home Rule. The winning Liberal Unionist candidate in 1886, Robert Verdin, was the brother of the defeated Conservative candidate in the previous general election, William Henry Verdin and he won by 458 votes. In November 1886, Brunner embarked on a world tour and his return to Northwich on 2 July 1887 was greeted with great celebration, as he was extremely popular in the town, regarded as a kind and sympathetic employer and a generous benefactor. Within three weeks of Brunner's return, Robert Verdin died and a by-election was called. At the 1892 general election, Brunner's opponent was not a Liberal Unionist, but a Conservative, George Whiteley, who was a cotton manufacturer from Blackburn. Brunner was returned with an increased majority of 1,255.

Northwich by-election, 1887
Party	Candidate	Votes	%	±%
Liberal	John Tomlinson Brunner	5,112	56.2	+8.9
Liberal Unionist	Lord Henry George Grosvenor	3,983	43.8	−8.9
Majority		1,129	12.4	N/A
Turnout		9,095	83.7	+4.5
Liberal gain from Liberal Unionist		Swing	+8.9	
