= John Foster (MP for Northwich) =

British military officer and politician

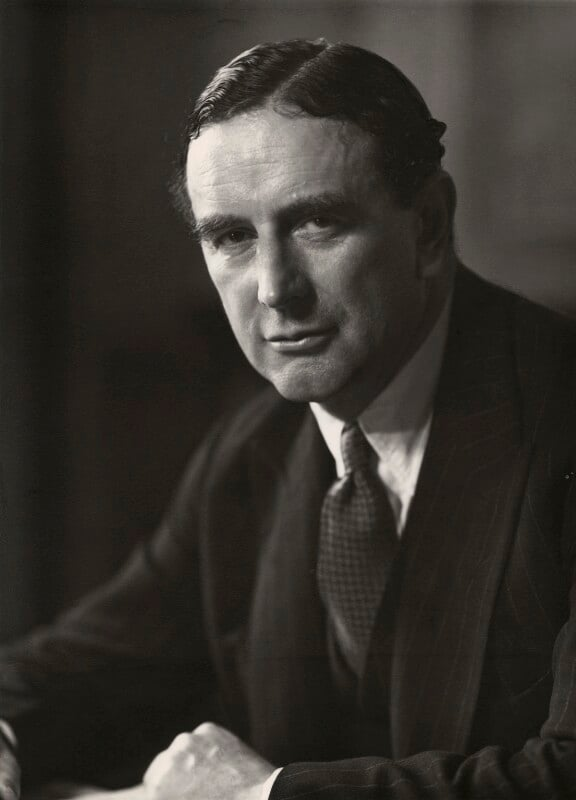
Foster in 1951

Brigadier Sir John Galway Foster KBE, QC (21 February 1903 – 1 February 1982) was a British Conservative Party politician, British Army officer and legal scholar. He served as Member of Parliament for the Northwich constituency in Cheshire from 1945 to February 1974, and was Under-Secretary of State for Commonwealth Relations from 1951 to 1954.

== Early life ==
John Galway Foster was born 21 February 1903 to Hubert John Foster and Mary Agatha Foster (née Tobin); he was their only child, but he had three half-siblings from his mother's previous marriage. His father was a British Army officer who served as Chief of the Australian General Staff from 1916 to 1917 during the First World War.

Miriam Rothschild, who knew John well for many years, writes that he had a "lonely, confused and homeless childhood." Rather than care for or relate to their son, his parents "abandoned [him] to the care of a governess, first in France and then at school in Germany." Apparently, the governess was harsh, strict, and unloving.

John Foster was a scholar of Eton College and achieved a first in modern history at New College, Oxford in 1924. He was elected a Fellow of All Souls the same year. He then entered the study of law and was called to the Bar by Inner Temple in 1927.

== Career ==
He was appointed Recorder Dudley (1936–38) and Recorder of Oxford (1938–51 & 1956–64). He lectured on private International Law at Oxford (1934–39) and The Hague. In 1939, he was in the United States and volunteered his services to the British Embassy. He was immediately appointed First Secretary and legal advisor. During this period, the United States was still a non-belligerent, and President Roosevelt faced many difficult problems related to the international law of neutrality. Foster played a significant behind-the-scenes role working on neutrality issues related to the Destroyer-for-Bases deal in 1940 and the Lend Lease Act in 1941.

Miriam Rothschild writes that, "John had dealt with the trauma and wounds of his unhappy childhood by totally eliminating the past — his father’s death [in 1919], his mother’s desertion and his homelessness — and any possible emotive perturbations in the present." He had "a unique gift of augmenting and gilding the actual moment." Isaiah Berlin and Rothschild independently described Foster "as the greatest life enhancer we had ever met."

Foster got on well with the Americans. Isaiah Berlin, who was in Washington, DC in 1940, said that Foster was "very, very popular and never had less than two or three hundred friends." He wanted to use "very earthy language [which] caused some consternation among the young ladies." The United States awarded him the Legion of Merit during his service with the British Embassy. By 1944, he had established himself as a capable attorney with a broad and deep understanding of the international law. That year, he was appointed chief of the legal section in General Dwight Eisenhower's, Supreme Headquarters Allied Expeditionary Force (SHAEF). In order to facilitate his relationships with the military forces, he was given the rank of brigadier. Foster later quipped: "One must start somewhere." In addition to the American Legion of Merit, he was awarded the Legion of Honour and the Croix de guerre (with palms) from France.

After the war, he participated in the Nuremberg trials. One of Brigadier Foster's most admirable actions involved the liberation of the Nazi death camps. Initially, well-meaning Allied forces simply liberated the camps and moved on to their next objective. As a result, many of the weak and starving prisoners simply died. When Foster learned of this problem, he had several direct meetings with Winston Churchill with the result that an effective procedure was put in place to provide the prisoners with needed care and protection.

In 1945, Northwich in Cheshire elected him a Conservative member of Parliament, and he served Northwich until 1974. From 1951–54, he was Parliamentary Under-Secretary of State, Commonwealth Relations. He took silk in 1950. Foster devoted most of his post-war career to the practice of law and to the vigorous advocacy of human rights, and was a co-founder of the law reform organisation JUSTICE. He especially worked as an advocate for victims of persecution. Miriam Rothschild describes in some detail his post-war efforts to assist victims of the Holocaust.

In 1986 the John Galway Foster Human Rights Trust was established; in 2006 the name of the trust was expanded to The Miriam Rothschild & John Foster Human Rights Trust. This funds an annual lecture on human rights.

== Later life ==
Foster was appointed a Knight Commander of the Order of the British Empire in 1964, and died in London 1 February 1982. His obituary described him as "a genius Benthamite Utilitarian who believed in the maximization of human pleasure." He never married, although he enjoyed a 30-year relationship with the art historian Princess Lulie Abul-Huda Fevzi Osmanoglu, the first Muslim woman to study at the University of Oxford. His executor destroyed the bulk of his papers dealing with his public life.

== Global policy ==
He was one of the signatories of the agreement to convene a convention for drafting a world constitution. As a result, for the first time in human history, a World Constituent Assembly convened to draft and adopt the Constitution for the Federation of Earth.

== See also ==
- Foster Report - Enquiry into the Practice and Effects of Scientology

Parliament of the United Kingdom
Preceded by Colum Crichton-Stuart	Member of Parliament for Northwich; 1945 – February 1974	Succeeded by Alastair Goodlad
