= Dale baronets =

Extinct baronetcy in the Baronetage of the United Kingdom

Escutcheon of the Dale baronets of West Lodge

The Dale Baronetcy, of West Lodge in the parish of Holy Trinity, Darlington, in the County of Durham, was a title in the Baronetage of the United Kingdom. It was created on 13 July 1895 for the industrialist David Dale. He was the grandson of the Scottish merchant and businessman David Dale.

The title became extinct on the death of the second Baronet in 1932.

== Dale baronets, of West Lodge (1895) ==
- Sir David Dale, 1st Baronet (1829–1906)
- Sir James Backhouse Dale, 2nd Baronet (1855–1932)

Baronetage of the United Kingdom
Preceded by Reynolds baronets	Dale baronets of West Lodge; 13 July 1895	Succeeded by Watson baronets
