= Robert Verdin =

- Born: 8 March 1836; Witton, Northwich, Cheshire
- Died: 27 July 1887; Leftwich, Northwich, Cheshire
- Occupations: Salt industrialist, politician
- Parent: Joseph Verdin

Robert Verdin (8 March 1836 – 25 July 1887) was a salt manufacturer, philanthropist and the Liberal Unionist Member of Parliament (MP) for Northwich from 1 July 1886 to 25 July 1887.

== Biography ==
Robert Verdin and his brothers, Joseph and William ran a family salt business known as Joseph Verdin & Sons (formerly Joseph and Richard Verdin), co-founded by their father, Joseph and his brother, Richard. They owned six salt plants in various locations throughout Cheshire, including Marston, Witton, Moulton, Over, Wharton and Middlewich. They employed over 1,000 people and produced approximately 353,000 tons of salt annually; it was the largest salt manufacturer in the United Kingdom by 1881.

Verdin was appointed a justice of the peace. In 1885, he stood against John Brunner for the Liberal Party nomination in the newly created parliamentary constituency of Northwich. Brunner won the nomination and successfully contested the seat against the Conservative candidate, William Henry Verdin, Robert's brother. However, in the following year Gladstone's Liberal government was defeated over Home Rule for Ireland and an election was called. The Liberal party being split, Brunner – loyal to Gladstone – stood against Verdin, a Liberal Unionist. Verdin won the seat, but died a year later. Brunner won the subsequent by-election.

As a philanthropist, Verdin gave the Victoria Infirmary, the Verdin Baths and Verdin Park to Northwich but died before they opened. A statue in his memory was erected in Verdin Park by public subscription.

He died, aged 51, on 25 July 1887 at his home, The Brockhurst, a Regency house in spacious grounds at Leftwich where he lived with his brother Joseph and sister Mary. He never married.

== See also ==
- Sir Joseph Verdin, 1st Baronet
- Victoria Infirmary
- Listed buildings in Northwich

Parliament of the United Kingdom
Preceded by John Brunner	Member of Parliament for Northwich; 1886 – 1887	Succeeded by John Brunner
