= Sir John Brunner, 1st Baronet =

British industrialist and politician (1842–1919)

The Right Honourable Sir John Brunner Bt DL
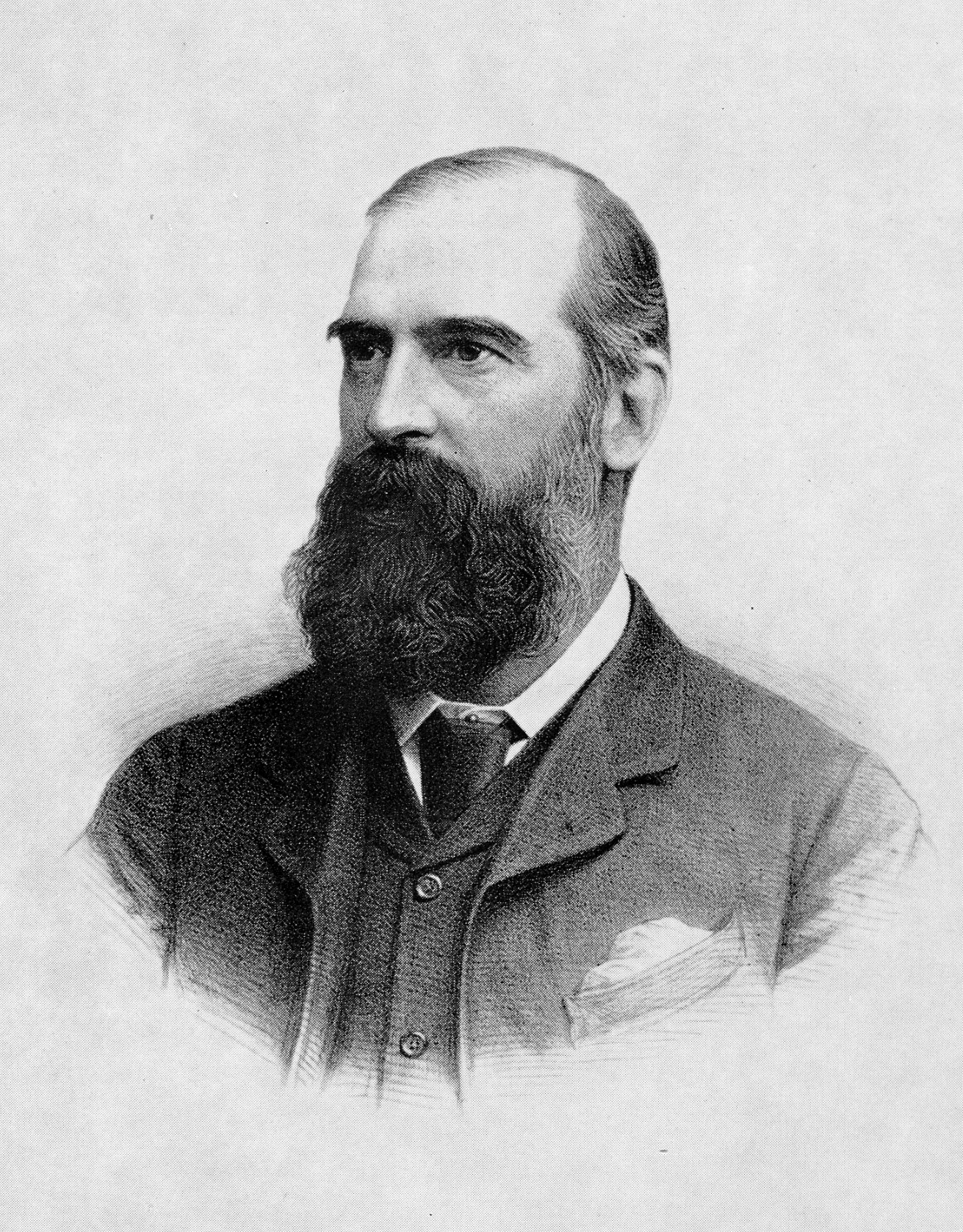
- John Brunner in 1885
- Born: John Tomlinson Brunner; 8 February 1842; Everton, Liverpool, England
- Died: 1 July 1919 (aged 77); Chertsey, Surrey, England
- Education: St. George's House, Everton
- Occupations: Chemical industrialist, politician
- Title: Baronet
- Spouses: Salome Davies; Jane Wyman
- Children: 7, including John

Sir John Tomlinson Brunner, 1st Baronet, DL (8 February 1842 – 1 July 1919) was a British chemical industrialist and Liberal Party politician. At Hutchinson's alkali works in Widnes he rose to the position of general manager. There he met Ludwig Mond, with whom he later formed a partnership to create the chemical company Brunner Mond & Co., initially making alkali by the Solvay process. As a Member of Parliament he represented Northwich, Cheshire, in 1885–1886 and then from 1887 to 1910. He was a paternalistic employer and as a politician supported Irish Home Rule, trade unions, free trade, welfare reforms and, leading up to the First World War, a more sympathetic stance towards Germany. Brunner was a prominent Freemason, and a generous benefactor to the towns in his constituency and to the University of Liverpool.

== Early life and career ==
John Tomlinson Brunner was born in Everton, Liverpool, the fourth child and second son of John Brunner (b. 20 June 1800), a Swiss Unitarian and schoolmaster, and Margaret Catherine Curphey (d. 8 September 1847), who originated from the Isle of Man, daughter of Thomas Curphey and wife Margaret Leece. His father established a school in Netherfield Road, Everton, known as St George's House, to teach children along the lines advocated by Pestalozzi. Brunner's mother died in 1847, when he was aged five; his father married Nancy Inman in 1851. She had a shrewd business sense and Brunner gave credit to her for teaching him skills in practical matters. Brunner was educated at his father's school and then, at the age of 15, he decided to follow a career in commerce. He spent four years in a shipping house in Liverpool, but found it neither exciting nor lucrative, and so decided on a change of career. In 1861, Brunner took a clerical post at Hutchinson's alkali works in Widnes, where his older brother Henry was already working as technical manager. There, he rose to the position of general manager. Shortly after starting work at Hutchinson's, Brunner met the German-born chemist Ludwig Mond.

== Brunner Mond and Company ==
In 1873 Brunner formed a partnership with Mond and together they founded Brunner Mond & Company. Their initial capital was less than £20,000 (£1.9 million in 2025), most of which was borrowed. In April 1872 Mond had been to Belgium to meet Ernest Solvay to negotiate terms to manufacture alkali by the process Solvay had developed. The Solvay process produced soda ash more cheaply than the established Leblanc process, from raw materials which were more easily obtainable, and produced fewer waste products. Mond made a gentlemen's agreement with Solvay to apportion the global markets, with Mond's company having exclusive rights to the United States and to the British Isles.

Brunner and Mond decided to build their factory at Winnington, near Northwich, Cheshire on land owned by Lord Stanley of Alderley. This was sited on the River Weaver which allowed for the transport of the raw materials and finished products to and from the works. Lord Stanley insisted on selling the house, Winnington Hall, as well as the surrounding land, as part of the deal. The purchase was completed in 1873, and for a time both Mond and Brunner lived separately in the wings of the hall. The early years were extremely difficult, initially in getting the plant to work efficiently and then in selling the soda ash. It was not until 1878 that success was achieved when they outsold their competitors and were producing their products more cheaply. In 1881, the partnership was converted into a limited company with capital assets listed at £600,000 (£6.3 million in 2025) and the founders became managing directors for life. In 1891, Brunner became the chairman and retained that position until April 1918, 14 months before his death. However, by then his duties were being increasingly performed by his son, Roscoe.

After its slow start, Brunner Mond & Company became the wealthiest British chemical company of the late 19th century. On its merger with three other British chemical companies to form Imperial Chemical Industries (ICI) in 1926, it had a market capitalization of over £18 million (£950 million in 2025). Brunner's sobriquet, "Chemical Croesus", was given to him by The Times. He was a paternalistic employer and went to great lengths to improve the situation of his employees. Measures introduced by Brunner and Mond were shorter working hours, sickness and injury insurance, and holidays with pay.

== Politics ==
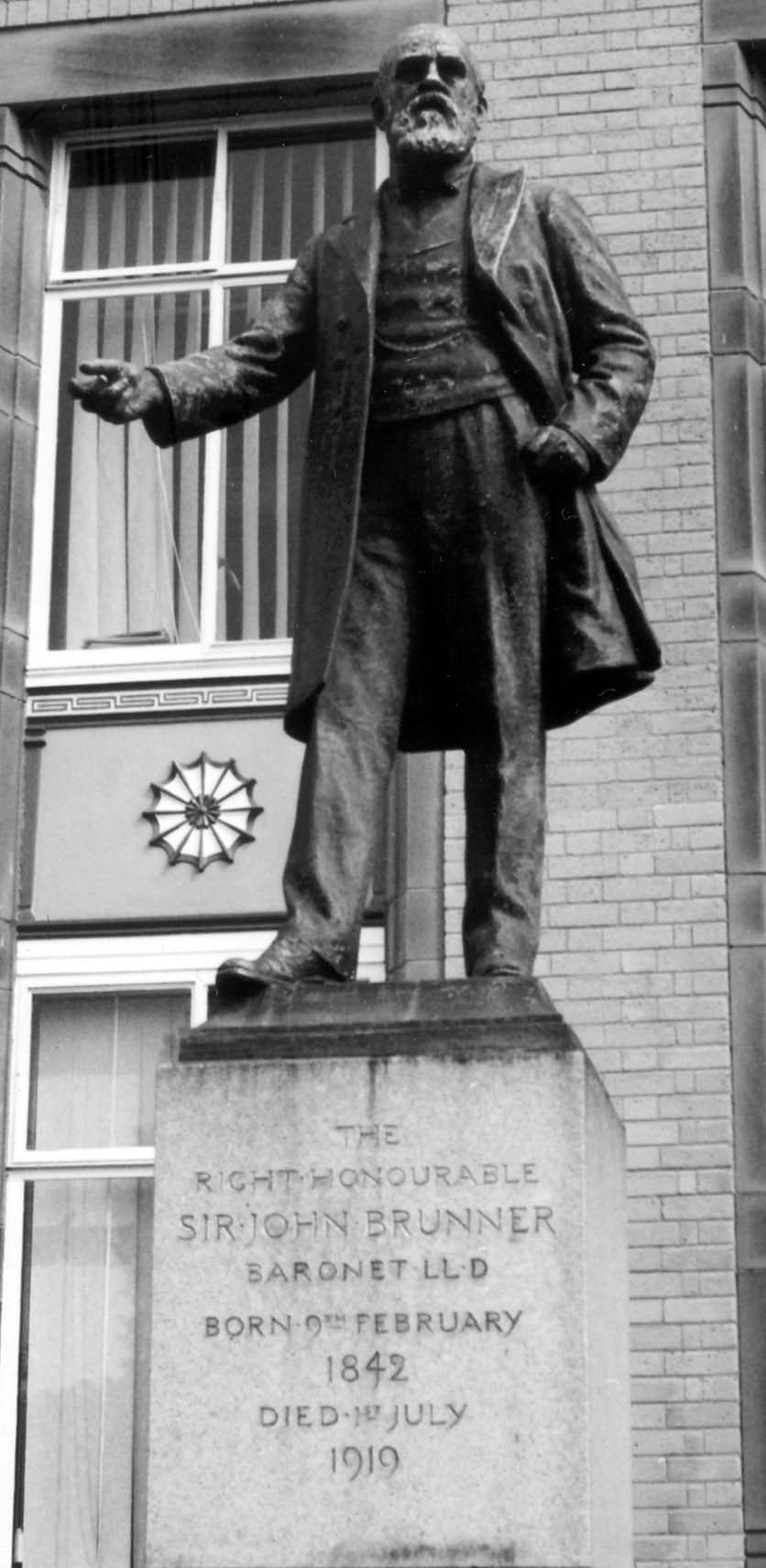
Statue of John Brunner in Winnington, Cheshire

During the years he was working at Hutchinson's in Widnes, Brunner was developing his political interests. He joined the Widnes chapter of the National Education League and became its secretary in 1872. This gave him the opportunity to come into contact with Liberals from Liverpool and other parts of the country. Soon after moving to Northwich Brunner became more practically involved with education locally, in particular with the British School in the town. He later served on its board of governors and also on the local sanitary authority. As a result of the Redistribution of Seats Act 1885 the parliamentary constituency of Northwich was created and Brunner offered himself as a candidate for the Liberal Party. In his speech for the position he expressed support for the disestablishment of the Church of England, for reform of property laws, for Irish Home Rule and for compensation for those whose properties had been damaged by the pumping of brine from the salt mines in the area. During the campaign he was heckled because he had a foreign-sounding name. He responded "My father was a Swiss, my mother was a Manx woman, I was born in Liverpool, my nurse was Welsh: is that Cheshire enough for you?" At the general election on 1 December 1885 Brunner beat William Henry Verdin, his Conservative rival, with a majority of 1,028.

The Liberal Party won more seats than any other party in the election, but insufficient to form a majority government, leaving the Irish Parliamentary Party holding the balance of power. It proved impossible to form a stable government, and so another general election was called in June 1886. In the meantime, the Liberal Party had split, and the Liberal Unionist Party had been formed. Brunner's opponent at the 1886 election was William Henry Verdin's brother, Robert, standing as a Liberal Unionist. The election was held on 13 July 1886, and Brunner was defeated by 458 votes. In November 1886, Brunner embarked on a world tour, accompanied by his wife and his son Stephen. His return to Northwich on 2 July 1887 was greeted with great celebration, as he was extremely popular in the town, regarded as a kind and sympathetic employer and a generous benefactor. Within three weeks of Brunner's return, Robert Verdin died and a by-election was called. Brunner's opponent was Lord Henry Grosvenor, who was standing as a Liberal Unionist. This time, at the by-election on 13 August, Brunner won with a majority of 1,129.

After the 1889 Armagh rail disaster, Brunner opposed moves to regulate safety on railways, saying during a debate on 2 August that safety should be left in the hands of "those who understand these matters best", i.e. the railway companies. But the government moved rapidly to have railway operations and safety supervised by the Board of Trade.

At the 1892 general election, Brunner's opponent was not a Liberal Unionist, but a Conservative, George Whiteley, who was a cotton manufacturer from Blackburn. Brunner was returned with an increased majority of 1,255. In the 1895 election he beat Thomas Ward, another Conservative, by 1,638 votes. The 1900 general election was held during the Boer War, to which Brunner was opposed. He retained his seat, but with a reduced majority of 699. In the 1906 general election, Brunner's opponent was the Conservative Colonel B. N. North who had fought in the Boer War. Brunner increased his majority to 1,792. He continued to be the Member of Parliament for Northwich until the general election in January 1910, when he decided not to stand again, partly because of his own health and also because of concern for his wife's health. Subsequently, he moved to Surrey, but continued to play a part in politics when he was elected to the Chertsey division of Surrey County Council.

As a Liberal MP he supported Irish Home Rule, trade unions, free trade and welfare reforms. Leading up to the First World War he argued that Britain should adopt a more sympathetic approach towards Germany, including naval disarmament. When war did break out, Brunner was resolute in the opinion that it should be fought and won. In addition to the production of alkali, his factories were making other chemicals for use as explosives. He also built a new factory to purify trinitrotoluene.

== Benefactions ==
Brunner was a generous benefactor whose gifts included the provision of schools, guildhalls and social clubs. In Northwich he provided a free library and re-endowed Sir John Deane's Grammar School. In Runcorn he purchased a disused chapel and presented it to the town to be used by the trades unions and the Friendly Societies, and in nearby Weston village he bought a disused school and gave it to the local community to serve as its village hall. He also endowed the chairs of economics, physical chemistry and Egyptology (the Brunner Professorships) at the University of Liverpool.

Abroad he gave gifts to the Landesmuseum in Zürich and provided a hospital, Spital Bülach, also in Switzerland. In 1885 he became a Freemason and in 1900 founded the John Brunner Lodge at Over Winsford. The following year he was honoured with the brevet rank of Past Grand Deacon of England.

In 1899 Brunner (who had by then been created a baronet) became chairman of the Runcorn and Widnes Transporter Bridge Company. He subscribed £25,000 (£2.8 million in 2025) towards its construction plus a loan of £12,000 (£1.3 million in 2025) together with a personal guarantee on a bank loan of £31,000 (£3.4 million in 2025). When the building of the bridge was complete in 1905 it was due to be opened by Edward VII, but the king was unable to attend, and so Brunner performed the ceremony himself. By 1911 it had become apparent that the bridge would always operate at a loss, and Brunner assigned his interest in it to Widnes Corporation. The Times stated that this action amounted to a "virtual gift of £68,000" (£6.9 million in 2025).

== Personal life ==
Brunner believed that his success owed much to the "courage and independence of thought" that he derived from his Unitarian faith and recalled the influence of visits to Renshaw Street Unitarian Chapel with his father as a child. On 14 June 1864 Brunner married Salome Davies, the daughter of a Liverpool merchant with whom he had six children. Salome died on 29 January 1874 and the following year he married Jane Wyman, the daughter of a Kettering physician and the governess to his children. From this marriage three more children, all daughters, were born. On 8 September 1890 his oldest son, John, got into difficulties whilst swimming in Lake Como, Italy. He was rescued by his younger sibling, Sidney Herbert Brunner, who lost his life in the process. Sidney's body was found on 10 September and buried in Bellagio, beside the lake, the next day. In 1891 the Brunners moved from Winnington Hall to Wavertree, a suburb of Liverpool.

Amongst other offices held, he was Vice-President of the British Science Guild, Deputy Lieutenant for the County of Lancashire (from 1904) and Pro-Chancellor of the University of Liverpool. In 1909 the University of Liverpool awarded him the honorary degree of Doctor of Laws. Brunner was President of Manchester College, Oxford (now named Harris Manchester College), from 1911 to 1917.

In 1895 he was made the Baronet of Druids Cross in the County of Lancashire and in 1906 he became a member of the privy council, but he declined offers of a peerage. He died in 1919 at his home in Chertsey, Surrey. His estate amounted to over £906,000 (£40 million in 2025). In addition, he had given generously to his five married daughters, and had transferred investments to his sons. The baronetcy passed to his eldest son, John Fowler Leece Brunner. His descendants include, through his elder son's daughter (Joyce Worsley, Lady Worsley, née Brunner), Katharine, Duchess of Kent (1933–2025), who married in 1961 to a grandson of King George V of the United Kingdom, and Shelagh Brunner (1902–1983), daughter of his younger son (Harold Roscoe Brunner), who morganatically married Prince Ferdinand of Liechtenstein (1901–1981) in 1925, a member of that principality's still-reigning dynasty.

Parliament of the United Kingdom
New constituency	Member of Parliament for Northwich; 1885–1886	Succeeded by Robert Verdin
Preceded by Robert Verdin	Member of Parliament for Northwich; 1887–1910	Succeeded by John Fowler Leece Brunner
Party political offices
Preceded by William Angus	President of the National Liberal Federation; 1911–1918	Succeeded by George Lunn
Baronetage of the United Kingdom
New creation	Baronet (of Druids Cross, Winnington Old Hall and Ennismore Gardens); 1895–1919	Succeeded by John Fowler Leece Brunner
