= Teacher Development Trust =

- Abbreviation: TDT
- Founded: 2012
- Founder: Mark McCourt, Martin Post, Robin Shlinklert, David Weston
- Type: Registered Charity
- Registration no.: Charity ref 1147447
- Purpose: Education
- Location: Swindon
- Region served: United Kingdom
- Key people: Gareth Conyard, Chief Executive; David Weston, Founder; Andrea Carr, Chair of Trustees
- Website: https://tdtrust.org/

The Teacher Development Trust (often abbreviated to TDT) is a UK charity which helps leaders build stronger schools through effective professional development. Founded by teachers in London in March 2012, the charity works to raise awareness of the importance of professional development for teachers and other education professionals.

== Mission ==
The TDT states its mission as providing “effective professional development in schools helps teachers thrive and children succeed", as well as to "make exceptional staff development achievable for every school."

== History ==
In April 2012, the British government closed the Training and Development Agency for Schools (TDA), the national body formerly responsible for teachers’ training and professional development.

In response to the planned closure, Teacher Development Trust was founded by teachers as a new agency aiming to support teachers’ professional learning.

Between 2012 and 2017, the charity coordinated the TDT Advisor platform (originally known as GoodCPDGuide) and monitored it alongside The Educational Endowment Foundation and Sutton Trust. This database provided listings and ratings for professional development training courses, consultancy, and other services.

TDT published its first significant research project, “Developing Great Teaching”, in 2015.

In 2017, the charity launched the first cohort of the “Associate Qualification in CPD Leadership”. As of 2025, 12 cohorts of school leaders have learned through this qualification.

For a time, Teacher Development Trust also operated the Teacher Development Trust Network, an opt-in UK school network whose members shared evidence-based professional development practice.

Teacher Development Trust worked as one of the government’s recognised providers of National Professional Qualifications (NPQs) for teachers and leaders for five years. In October 2024, the charity officially withdrew from providing future NPQs, reporting that they had chosen to focus on supporting schools through research and their alternative programmes.

== Programmes ==
Teacher Development Trust runs a number of national and international programmes. These are intended to build participants’ skills and expertise in CPD leadership in education, leading to improved practice in schools. They currently include:

- Building Expert Schools. Participating schools go through an in-depth process of “Diagnostic Review” to identify areas of strength and development in their CPD offer. They receive a “Bronze, silver, or Gold” award and ongoing support.
- Instructional Coaching Training. A hybrid program where leaders and a team of coaches learn the skills to lead and embed a successful Instructional Coaching programme at their school over 5 sessions.
- The TDT Associate Qualification in CPD Leadership. A remote programme for school leaders of CPD, accredited by The Chartered College of Teaching. Leaders are given training in the research and principles of effective professional development and supported through projects to evaluate and plan CPD at their school.
- Foundation in CPD Leadership. A remote introductory programme on leading CPD for a team within a school or trust
- 1:1 Coaching Packages. Remote coaching for those with a responsibility for planning, leading or delivering professional development

The Teacher Development Trust Website also hosts 90-minute Online Learning Modules to purchase, themed around their 7 Domains of People-Powered School Improvement.

== Other work ==
In 2025, Teacher Development Trust launched a free “CPD Leadership Hub”. The platform hosts a reflection tool, a curated library of resources for CPD leads, and a selection of purchasable Online Learning Modules.

Since 2015, Teacher Development Trust has been instrumental in the creation of research reports on subjects including Teacher Appraisal, Teacher Autonomy, and the Early Career Framework. Their September 2025 report introduced “Didagogy” as a term by which to refer to the discipline of teaching teachers.

The charity hosts a biannual National Conference, gathering education leaders and policy makers to discuss continuous professional development in schools. In 2025, they began an annual lecture series for the education sector: The David Monis-Weston Lecture.

Teacher Development Trust provides free advice for teachers and schools through their free 30 minute call offer.

== Response ==
The Department for Education, the Teaching Agency and the National College for School Leadership have all expressed support for the Teacher Development Trust.

In its September 2013 report on the causes of educational failure, Requires Improvement, the Centre for Social Justice used Teacher Development Trust research and reports to demonstrate the importance of professional standards in teacher development.

The Trust was visited by Ofsted to evaluate its provision of NPQs in 2024 and was rated “Outstanding”.

== Management ==
The Trust's current chief executive is Gareth Conyard, co-author of “Improving Education Policy Together”.

Teacher Development Trust’s founder and former CEO is David Monis-Weston. He left the TDT in 2024 and is now the AI Lead at Purposeful Ventures.

=== Trustees ===
The Trust's board of trustees is made up of:

- Andrea Carr (Chair)
- Harjit Athwal
- Dame Sue John
- Arvi A. I. Luoma
- Mathilda Pynegar
- Michael Shaw
- Samantha Twiselton
- Victoria Merrick
- Chloe Saklow
- Ed Dorrell
- Sally Spence
