= Camps International =

International volunteer travel operator

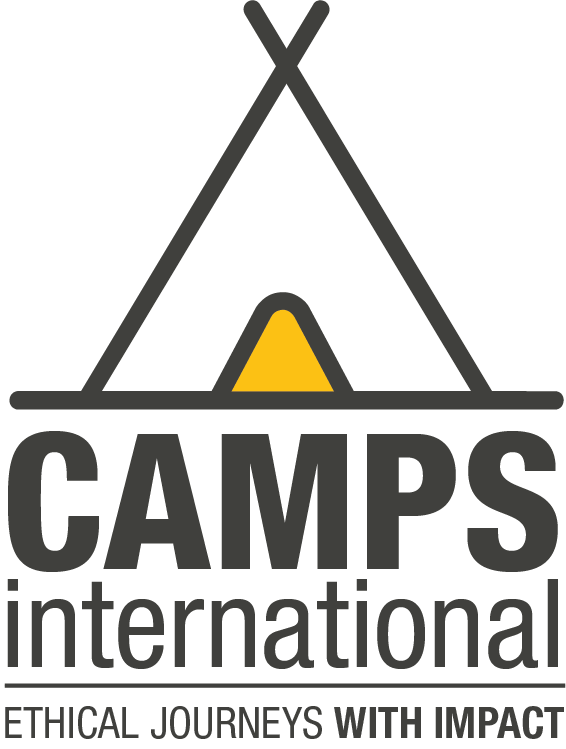
- Type: Limited Company
- Industry: School expeditions
- Founded: 2002
- Headquarters: Ringwood, United Kingdom; Dubai, United Arab Emirates; Diani, Kenya; Kota Kinabalu, Malaysia; Quito, Ecuador; Minneapolis, United States of America
- Key people: Stuart Rees Jones, CEO and Director; Matt Lacey, COO and Director; Simon Englefield, Director (Africa); Rory Hall, Director (Africa); Carl Palmer, Financial Director
- Products: school trips, school expeditions
- Number of employees: 150+
- Website: www.campsinternational.com

Camps International Ltd is an international volunteer travel operator headquartered in Ringwood, Hampshire UK, Dubai, UAE, USA and Australia. Camps International build permanent volunteer accommodation camps within Kenya, Tanzania, Borneo, Cambodia, Costa Rica, Ecuador and Peru. Its products include adventure expeditions, educational school expeditions for UK, USA, UAE and Australian school groups.

Camps International was founded in 2002 by Stuart Rees Jones, selling volunteer expeditions to Diani, Kenya, for volunteers to participate in projects related to the local schools. In 2003, Stuart Rees Jones and Simon Englefield set up Camp Kenya Limited, as a branch of Camps International, to help manage the projects based in Diani. Camp Kenya offices are located on Diani Beach. The Camp Kenya headquarters are led by director Simon Englefield. They were featured in The Telegraph Gap Year 100 Company Directory in 2010.

Camps International now employs over 150 local people from the communities surrounding their camps.

== Camp locations ==
=== Camp Kenya ===
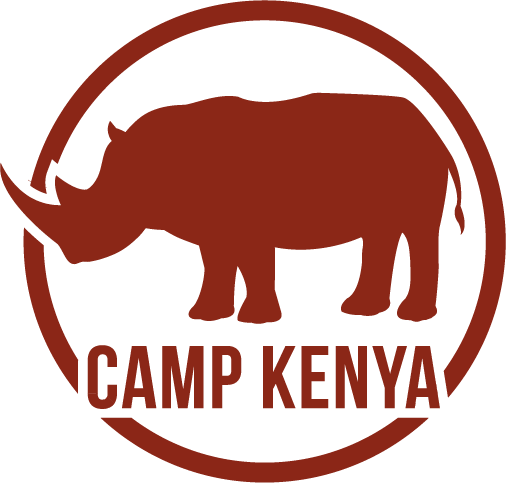
Camp Kenya logo

Camp Kenya is a branch of Camps International UK, UAE and Kenya based gap year sports and school expedition provider. The company was founded in 2003 by Stuart Rees Jones and Simon Englefield.

Camp Kenya Headquarters in Kenya are based in Diani, Ukunda 50 km south of Mombasa and also bordering Tsavo national parks, 160 km north west of Mombasa. The Camp Kenya logo features a black rhino which is classified as critically endangered in Kenya.

==== Camp Muhaka ====
Camp Muhaka is a permanent bush camp set within a small rural African community on the lower slopes of the Shimba Hills National Reserve. Built in 2007, the camp sits in the middle of a forest of palm and mango trees.

Camps International's Camp Kenya branch project manages education initiatives for the area's local schools, building homes for elderly residents and the poor.

==== Camp Tsavo ====
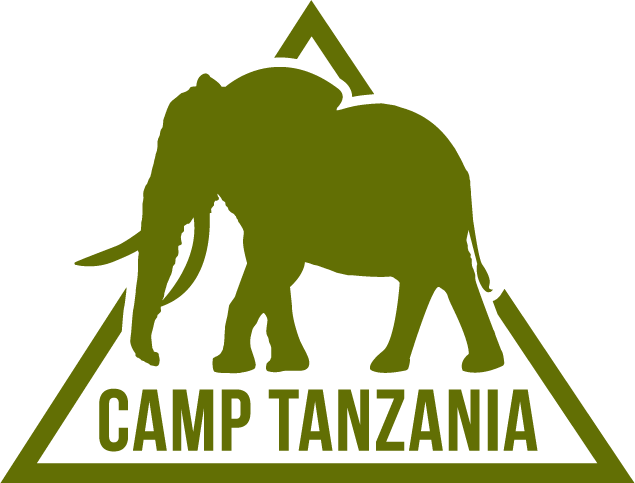
Camp Tanzania logo

Camp Tsavo is a permanent camp located in Maungu, which is between Tsavo East and Tsavo West national parks near Voi. The camp was set up by Camps International's Camp Kenya branch on 9 October 2014. Camp Kenya branch oversee and manage projects in the area for education initiatives and wildlife conservation initiatives. In 2015, Camp Tsavo was ‘Highly Commended’ in The Safari Awards for ‘Best Community Focused Safari Property’, ‘Best Ecologically Responsible Safari Property’.

=== Camp Tanzania ===
Following the growth of Camp Kenya, Camps International expanded into Tanzania and set up Camp Tanzania in 2007. Camp Tanzania is a second branch of Camps International's, parallel to the company's Camp Kenya. The Camp Tanzania logo features an African elephant.

==== Camp Mbokomu ====
Camp Mbokomu is a permanent camp located within a rural village on the foothills of Mount Kilimanjaro and was founded in 2007 by Camps International. Camp Mbokomu project manages environmental conservation work within the surrounding area.

==== Camp Kidia ====
Camp Kidia is a permanent camp located within a rural village on the foothills of Mount Kilimanjaro and was founded in 2007 by Camps International. Camp Kidia project manages environmental and wildlife conservation work within the area.

=== Camp Borneo ===
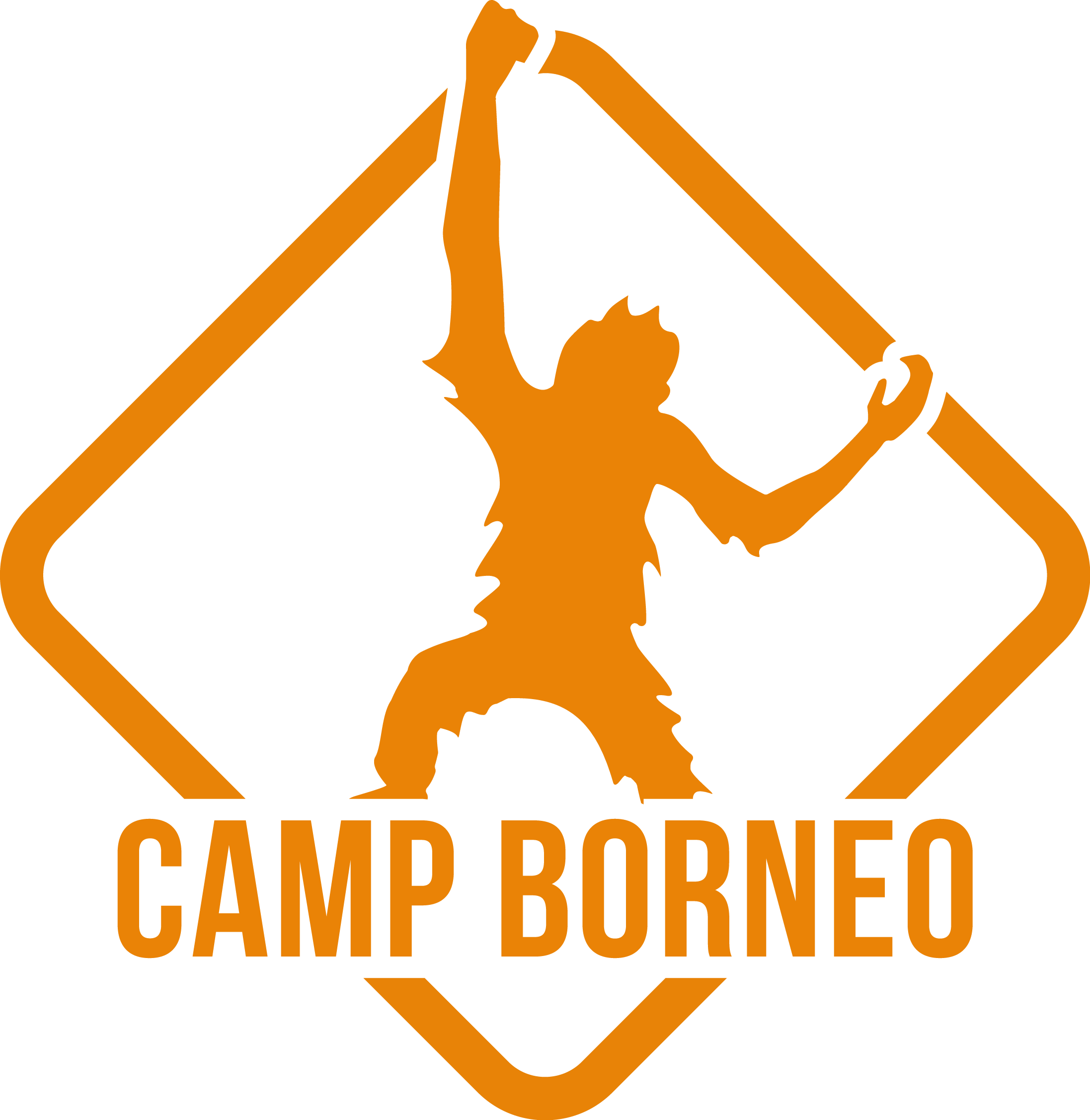
Camp Borneo logo

Camp Borneo was founded on 21 August 2008 under the company Camps International. The branch was granted a license to operate as an inbound tour operator under the name of Camp Borneo Travel & Tours Sdn Bhd in March 2009. The company has its main offices in Kota Kinabalu, Sabah with three permanent camps in rural areas of the Malaysian state of Sabah. The Camp Borneo logo features an orangutan, selected because it is one of the most iconic animals native to Borneo. Many Camp Borneo volunteers visit Sepilok Orang Utan Rehabilitation Centre during their trip.

Camp Borneo works closely with PACOS Trust , a local grass roots charity, working to improve rural standards of living.

==== Camp Tinangol ====
Camp Borneo opened their first camp, Camp Tinangol, in 2009. The camp is 30 minutes south of the district town of Kudat, in northern Sabah. It is based on the outskirts of the Rungus ethnic group community, and is built around two large traditional style longhouses. The camp was opened following the consent of the local community and landowners. The camp managed the construction of a kindergarten facility which was officially opened on 30 January 2015, in conjunction with sustainable design firm Arkitrek .

==== Camp Bongkud ====
Camp Bongkud was opened by Camps International within the Dusun community of Kg Bongkud to the east of Ranau. The camp is nearby to the Poring Hot Springs and is situated within the main community. It is the largest of Camp Borneo's permanent camps being able to house up to 100 visitors. Camp Bongkud oversaw the construction of the Asang Community Centre which was opened in December 2014, and built by Camp Borneo volunteers. It was built using recycled driftwood collected during beach cleanups

Other projects include constructing small pedestrian bridges to aid during rainy seasons and refurbishing both a single mothers’ centre and small kindergarten.

=== Camp Cambodia ===
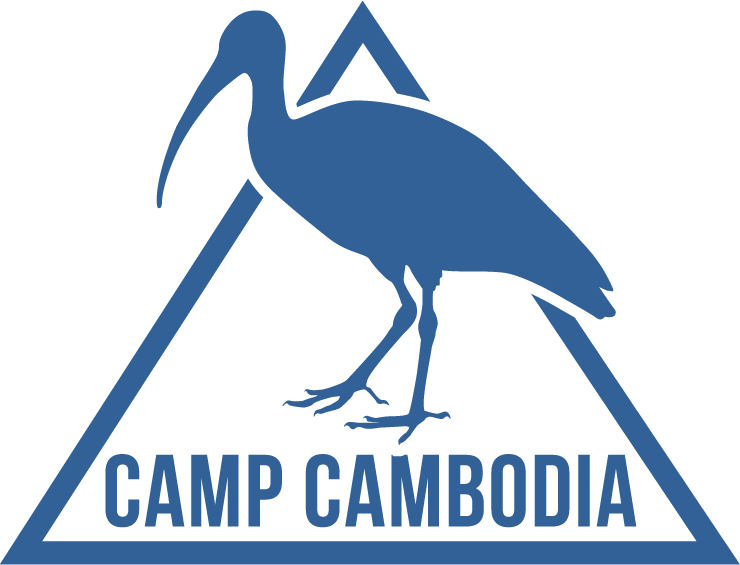
Camp Cambodia logo

Camps International (Cambodia) Co. Ltd was incorporated on 13 July 2010 as a licensed tour operator and has its main office in Siem Reap. The company runs two permanent camps in Cambodia located in Beng Pae and Beng Mealea. The Camp Cambodia logo features a giant ibis, a critically endangered ibis found in northern Cambodia.

==== Camp Beng Mealea ====
Camp Beng Mealea was established in 2010, taking its first visitors at the end of that year. Beng Mealea is located 90 mins northeast of Siem Reap town, and has its own temple complex. The camp contains three longhouses and can take up to 80 visitors in capacity. The camp project manages improvements to a local school's infrastructure including the library, teacher accommodation block and classroom refurbishment.

==== Camp Beng Pae ====
Camp Beng Pae was established in May 2014 and is situated within Kampong Thom Province. It is approximately 50 km north of Kampong Thom town, sitting on the edge of the Beng Pae Wildlife Reserve within Tu Lek village. It contains two large longhouses for accommodation with a capacity of 64 people. The camp project manages a tree nursery, building houses for impoverished families and refurbishment within the community's school.

=== Camp Ecuador ===
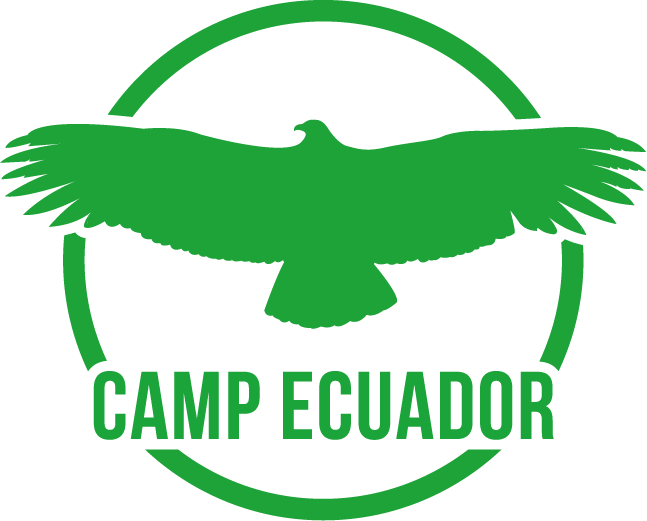
Camp Ecuador logo

Camp Ecuador was founded in 2011 and founded by Latin America Director Damian Scott-Masson. The Camp Ecuador logo features an Andean condor, the national symbol of Ecuador.

==== Camp Donbiki ====
Camp Amazonia is located in a small Kichwa community, one hour away from the city of Tena. The camp includes a timber camp house built by the local community, and there is a river next to the camp. The camp was officially opened in October 2012. The camp is responsible for building a playground for the local children within the community in 2012. The camp also project manages the building of fish ponds, bus stops, community buildings including kitchens and dining halls for the community's school. The camp also manage a reforestation project within a local botanical garden, helping to prevent the extinction of native Ecuadorian plants.

==== Camp Costa ====
Camp Costa is located on the "Ruta del Spondylus" that goes along the Ecuadorian Pacific Coast and is a half an hour drive from Puerto López, a fishing town. The camp houses a community building that is also used for tourists who visit the area. The camp is located on the shores of the Pacific Ocean. The camp are responsible for the project management of building a playground in the community, a fence around a school that is located near a busy highway, a birdwatching space, cleaning the beach, building and managing an organic farming greenhouse. Volunteers also built a giant turtle statue out of recycled materials that were found on beach cleaning projects. The turtle displays information on the importance of recycling and preserving the habitat of turtles in the area.

==== Camp Kuri Kucho ====
Camp Kuri Kucho was opened in July 2014. It is situated close to the Cayambe volcano, thirty minutes away from Cayambe town. The camp were responsible for the development of a cultural centre (known as a Pukara in Quichua) the construction of an organic agricultural farm and a playground for the children within the local community.

=== Camp Peru ===
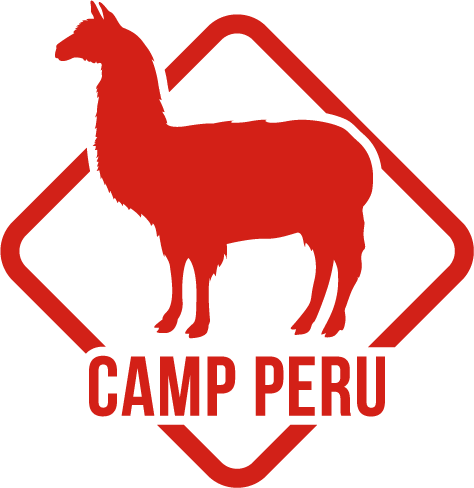
Camp Peru logo

Camp Peru was founded in August 2012, with the first volunteers travelling in 2014. The Camp Peru logo is a llama, an animal famously associated with Peru.

==== Camp Titicaca ====
Camp Titicaca was set up in July 2014. It is located on a small peninsula near the town of Capachica, on the shores of Lake Titicaca. It is situated between the cities of Juliaca and Puno. The camp has overseen the building of toilets and shower facilities, and providing running water and electricity to houses in the community. The camp have also managed providing English lessons to people within the community.

==== Camp Colca ====
Camp Colca was opened in July 2014, with its first group of volunteers being part of Camps International's school expedition trips. It is located on the edge of the Colca Canyon and is in the middle of a small town on the road from Chivay to Cabanaconde. Arequipa is the nearest city, situated about three hours away. The camp are responsible for building a kitchen for the local primary school in February 2015, the refurbishment of classrooms in the secondary school and the relaying of the kindergarten's playground. The camp also provide English lessons in the community and have developed the aesthetics of the community plaza.

==== Camp Moray ====
Camp Moray is located around two hours from Cusco, near the ancient Inca Moray ruins. The camp sits high in the Sacred Valley. The camp is responsible for projects to develop water systems, build toilets and greenhouses for the community, and reforest large areas of the land surrounding the community.

=== Camp Costa Rica ===
Camp Costa Rica opened in 2017. The Camp Costa Rica logo is a toucan, a bird famously associated with Costa Rica.

==== Camp Salitre ====
Camp Salitre is located within the territory of the indigenous Bribi people, who have their own distinct culture and autonomous control over their lands. The community is working to preserve its traditions, identity and ancestral beliefs. The camps is based in a group of traditional wooden buildings surrounded by forest. Visitors share the camp with fellow travellers, as well as the wildlife that inhabits the surrounding area, including toucans.

==== Camp Caño Negro ====
Camp Caño Negro is located within the Caño Negro wildlife refuge in northern Costa Rica, close to the Nicaraguan border. The camp is surrounded by waterways and is situated next to one of the world's most important migratory bird habitats. The area is home to a variety of wildlife, including caiman, which can often be spotted basking along the riverbanks in the morning.

== The Camps Foundation ==
The Camps Foundation is a Registered Charity #1125858 founded by Camps International in 2009. All money raised for The Camps Foundation is spent on project work that is undertaken by volunteers on Camps International expeditions, because the company covers all administration and running costs of the charity.

== Awards ==
Camps International have won a number of awards including:

- Global Youth Travel Awards 2025: Best Sustainable Tour Operator
- GoAbroad Awards 2021: Innovation in Online Programming’ winner (for Real World Studies)
- Global Youth Travel Awards 2019: Best Sustainable Organisation’ Winner
- Safari Awards 2015 Finalist: Best Ecologically Responsible Safari (Camp Tsavo)
- Safari Awards 2015 Finalist: Best Community Focused Safari Property (Camp Tsavo)
- Safari Awards 2015 Finalist: Best Value Safari Property (Camp Tsavo)
- Global Angels Awards 2013: Business With Exceptional DNA
- British Youth Travel Awards 2012: Best Volunteering Organisation Finalist
- Global Angels Awards 2012: Outstanding Social Enterprise
- Eco Warrior Award Winner 2010: Most Sustainable Community Based Tourism Enterprise
- Virgin Holidays Responsible Tourism Awards 2008: Best Volunteering Organisation Winner
- Virgin Holidays Responsible Tourism Awards 2007: Best Volunteering Organisation Highly Commended

== Accreditations ==
Camps International are accredited by:

- Learning Outside the Classroom Quality Badge
- British Safety Standard BS8848
- ASDAN
- Duke of Edinburgh
- EPA Expedition Providers Association
