= Victoria Infirmary =

- Mid Cheshire Hospitals NHS Foundation Trust
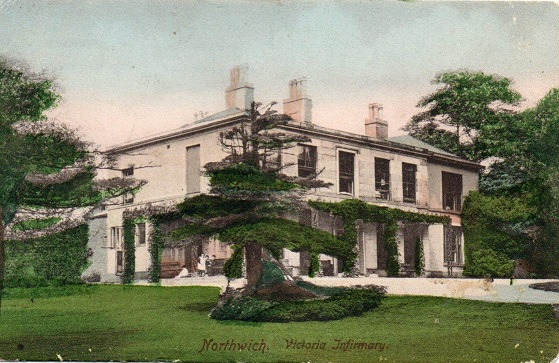
- Victoria Infirmary in 1906

- Shown in Cheshire

Geography
- Location: Cheshire, England
- Coordinates: 53.2617°N 2.5193°W

Organisation
- Care system: NHS

Services
- Emergency department: No

History
- Founded: 1887

Links
- Website: www.mcht.nhs.uk
- Lists: Hospitals in England

Victoria Infirmary is a small hospital located in the town of Northwich, Cheshire, England. It is managed by the Mid Cheshire Hospitals NHS Foundation Trust.

== History ==
The Infirmary originally opened in 1887 when a local MP, Robert Verdin, donated the building for use as a hospital. Extensions included a new wing in 1902, a children's ward in 1924 and further additions in the 1930s. After joining the National Health Service in 1948, it became the Victoria Infirmary and Clinic in 1950 and reverted to the Victoria Infirmary in 1975.

== Services ==
The hospital benefits from dedicated support services, a minor injuries unit (open between 9 am and 10 pm), a therapy services department and many outpatient services. These services are supported by an outpatient CT scanner department, newly constructed in 2022.

== See also ==
- Listed buildings in Northwich
