= Harry Dewhurst =

British politician

Harry Dewhurst was Conservative MP for Northwich.

He won the seat from the Liberals in 1918, but stood down in 1922.

== Sources ==
- British Parliamentary Election Results 1918-1949, F W S Craig
- Whitaker's Almanack, 1919 to 1922 editions
