= John McClellan (chemist) =

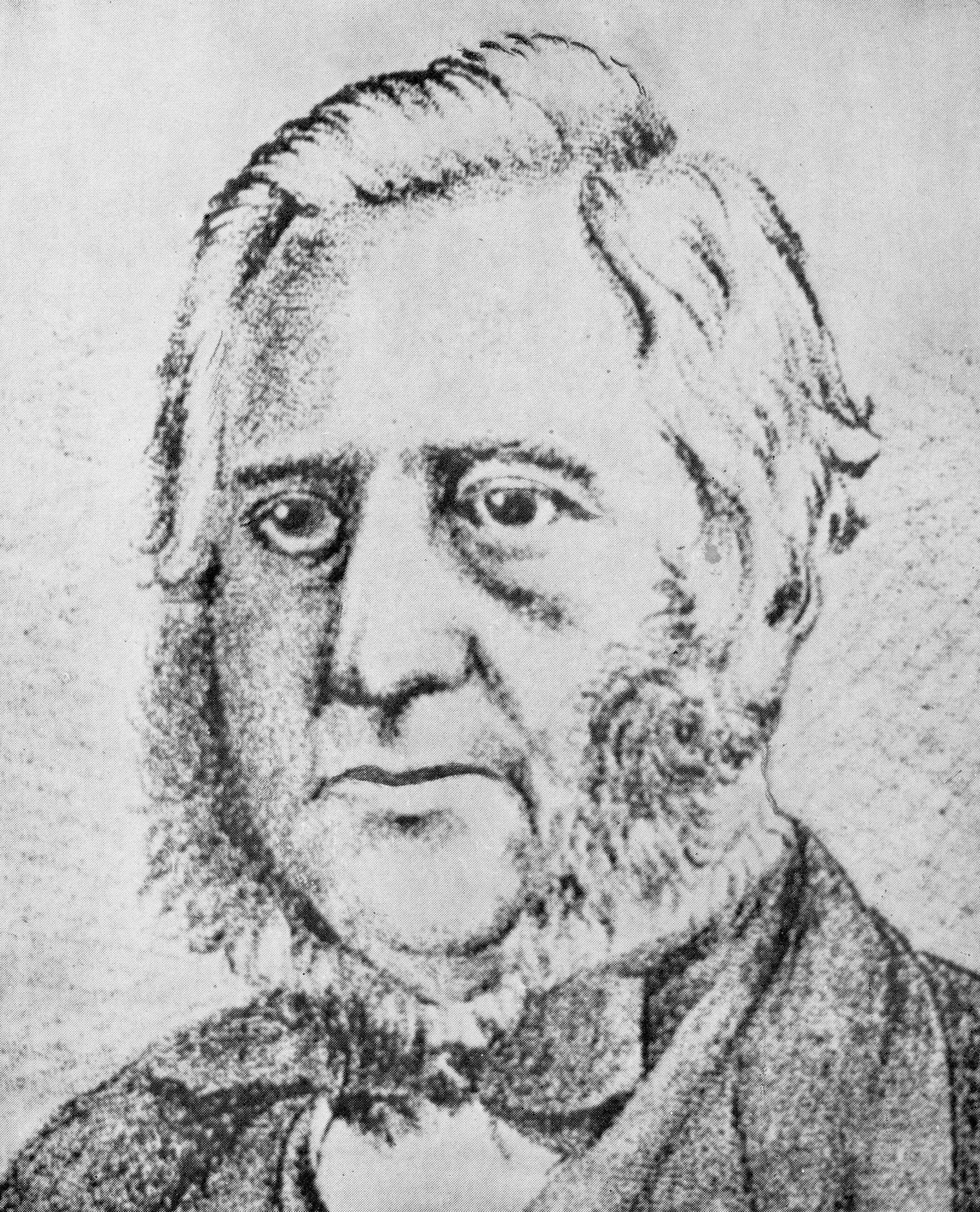
- John McClellan
- Born: 1810
- Died: 14 May 1881 (aged 70–71); Widnes, Lancashire, England
- Citizenship: English
- Known for: Alkali manufacture
- Scientific career
- Fields: Chemist

Notes
- Opened one of the first chemical factories in Widnes

John McClellan (1810 – 14 May 1881) was a chemist and industrialist who established one of the first chemical factories in Widnes, Lancashire, England. (Note: At that time Widnes was in the historical county of Lancashire; it is now in the ceremonial county of Cheshire.)

John McClellan was born in Liverpool, the younger son of Alexander McClellan, a Scottish draper, and his wife Jane née Charlton. He started in business in Liverpool as a drysalter and in 1847 described himself as a merchant, borax manufacturer and ashes refiner. That year he moved to Widnes and started to manufacture borax there. Later he also manufactured soda ash, saltcake and bleaching powder. In the 1870s the business failed and in 1879 it was declared bankrupt.

McClellan was a member of the Widnes Local Board from its inception in 1865 and in 1869 became its chairman. He died at his home in Widnes in 1881. His estate was valued at £81.

McClellan married Mary Gaskell, the daughter of a Liverpool cotton broker, in 1844. They had five children, one son, Alexander, and four daughters. Sarah Jane, their eldest daughter, married Henry Brunner, John Hutchinson's chief chemist. Alexander joined his father in the business and tried to continue it after his father's death but was unsuccessful.

== References and notes ==
Notes

Citations

Sources

- Hardie, D. W. F. (1950), A History of the Chemical Industry of Widnes, London: Imperial Chemical Industries, OCLC 7503517
