= Henry Brunner =

English chemist

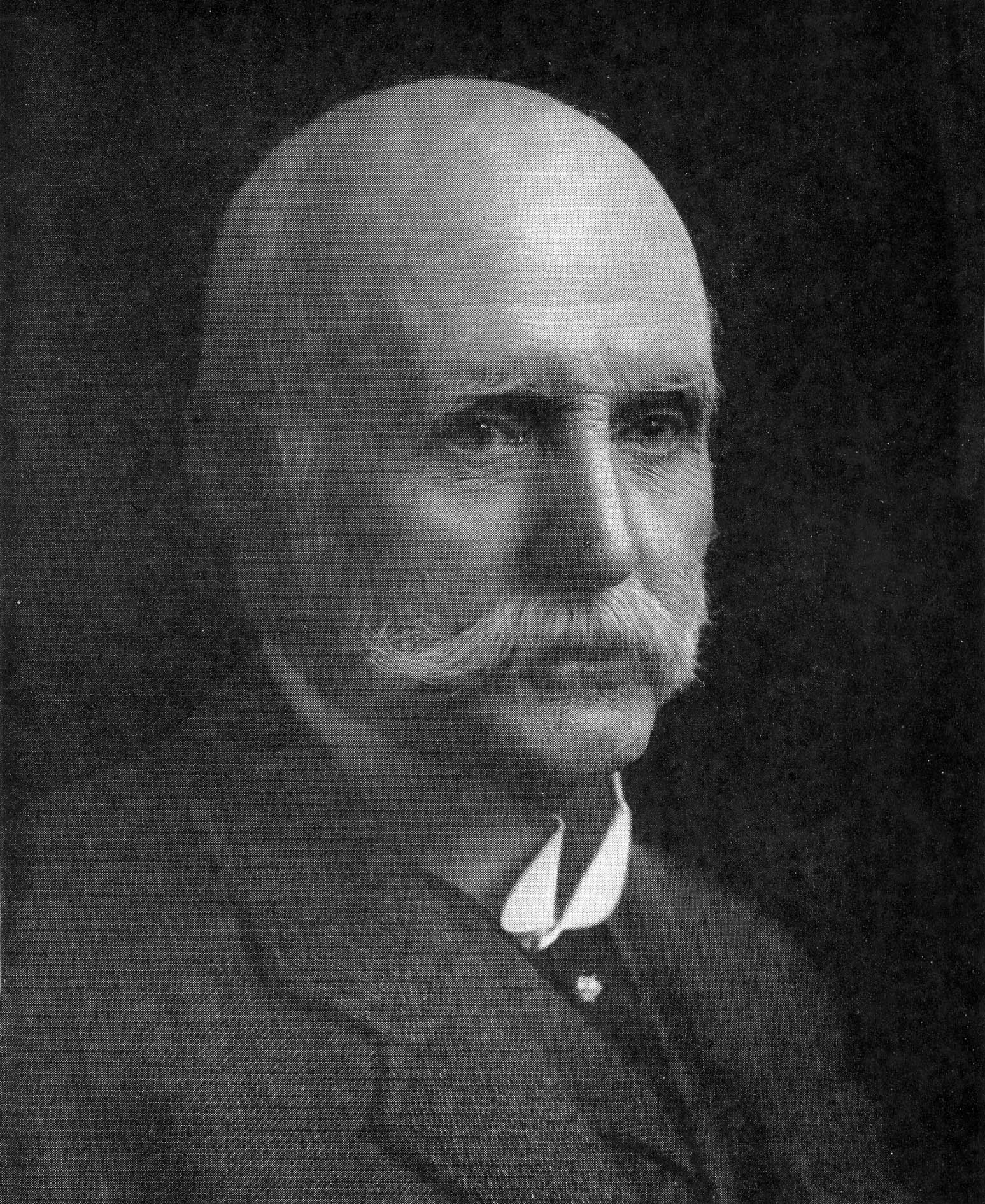
- Henry Brunner
- Born: 2 January 1838; Everton, Liverpool, England
- Died: 17 June 1916 (aged 78); Huyton, Liverpool, England
- Education: Zürich Polytechnic
- Known for: Manufacture of alkali and chlorine
- Scientific career
- Fields: Chemist
- Workplaces: John Hutchinson and Company; Brunner, Mond and Company

Henry Brunner (22 January 1838 – 17 June 1916) was an English chemist.

Henry Brunner was born in Everton, Liverpool, the elder son of John Brunner, a Swiss Unitarian and schoolmaster, and Margaret Curphey, who originated from the Isle of Man. He was educated at his father's school, St. George's House, Everton and later at Zürich Polytechnic. In 1861 he was employed by John Hutchinson in his chemical business in Widnes, Lancashire where he became chief chemist. Partly because he could speak good German, he became a friend of Ludwig Mond when the latter came to work in the company in 1862. Henry arranged Mond's first temporary accommodation in Widnes at the Mersey Inn (formerly the Snig Pie Inn). It is likely that Henry persuaded Hutchinson to take up Mond's sulphur recovery process. After Hutchinson died in 1865 he worked as a chemist with the Hutchinson Trustees and later, with Hedley and Young, formed the firm of John Hutchinson and Company. Later he became a director of Brunner, Mond and Company.

Henry was the elder brother of John Tomlinson Brunner who became general manager of Hutchinson's works and was later, with Mond, to establish the Brunner Mond Company. Henry married Sarah Jane McClellan, daughter of John McClellan, Widnes borax manufacturer in 1868. They lived in Cliff House, Appleton, Widnes and later moved to Holly Mount, Huyton, where Henry died in 1916.
