= Widnes =

Town in Cheshire, England

Coordinates: 53.362°N 2.734°W

- Town
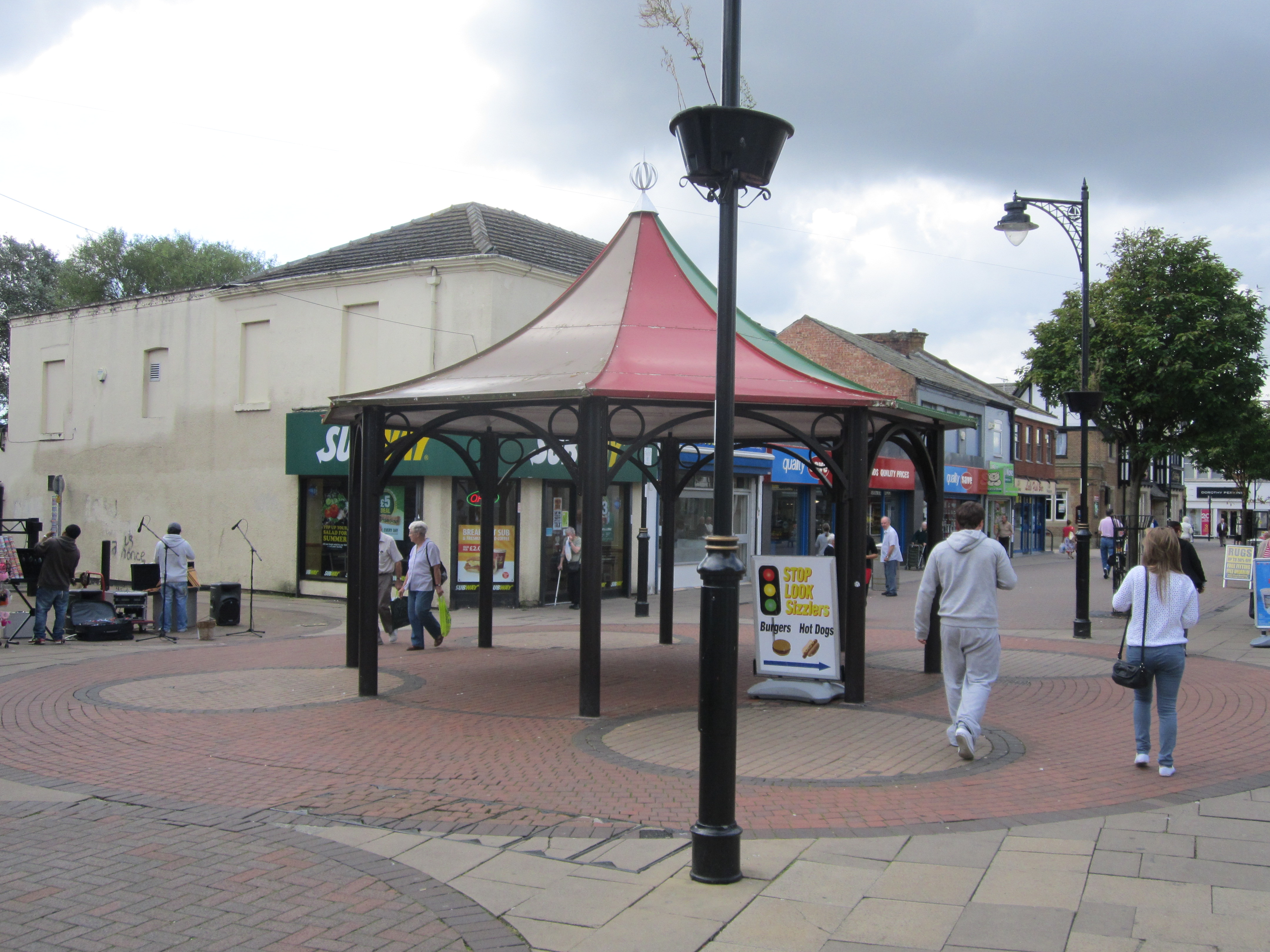
- Widnes Town Centre

- Location within Cheshire
- Population: 62,400 (2021)
- Demonym: Widnesian
- OS grid reference: SJ 5124 8527
  - London: 169 mi (272 km) SE
- Unitary authority: Halton
- Ceremonial county: Cheshire
- Region: North West
- Country: England
- Sovereign state: United Kingdom
- Post town: WIDNES
- Postcode district: WA8
- Dialling code: 0151
- Police: Cheshire
- Fire: Cheshire
- Ambulance: North West
- UK Parliament: Widnes and Halewood

Widnes (/ˈwɪdnəs/ WID-nəss) is an industrial town in the Borough of Halton, Cheshire, England, which at the 2021 census had a population of 62,400.

Historically in Lancashire, it is on the northern bank of the River Mersey where the estuary narrows to form the Runcorn Gap. Directly to the south across the Mersey is the town of Runcorn. Upstream 8 miles (13 km) to the east is Warrington, and 4 miles downstream to the west is Speke, a suburb of Liverpool.

Before the Industrial Revolution, Widnes was a small settlement on marsh and moorland. In 1847, the chemist and industrialist John Hutchinson established a chemical factory at Spike Island. The town grew in population and rapidly became a major centre of the chemical industry. The demand for labour was met by large-scale immigration from Ireland, Poland, Lithuania and Wales. The town continues to be a major manufacturer of chemicals, although many of the chemical factories have closed and the economy is predominantly based upon service industries.

Widnes and Hough Green railway stations are on the Liverpool–Manchester line. The main roads through the town are the A557 in a north–south direction and the A562 east–west. The disused Sankey Canal terminates at Spike Island. The Silver Jubilee Bridge crosses the River Mersey west of Warrington. In 2017, the Mersey Gateway Bridge opened to relieve congestion at the older bridge. The Catalyst Science Discovery Centre is the United Kingdom's only museum dedicated solely to the Chemical Industry and is inside Hutchinson's former administrative building. The town's sport stadium hosts Widnes Vikings rugby league club.

The motto of Widnes is the Latin phrase Industria Ditat ("Industry Enriches").

== History ==
=== Toponymy ===
The most usual explanation for the origin of the name Widnes is that it comes from the Danish words vid, meaning 'wide', and noese, meaning 'nose', referring to the promontory projecting into the River Mersey. However, the Widnes promontory is not particularly wide and another possible explanation is the first part derives from the Danish ved, meaning 'a wood' and possibly referring to a tree-covered promontory. Earlier spellings of the name have been Vidnes, Wydnes and Wydness.

=== Early history ===
There is little evidence of any early human occupation of the area although a flint arrowhead was discovered at Pex Hill, suggesting there was some human presence in the Stone Age. Pex Hill is a disused quarry, located to the north of the town. Roman roads by-passed the area but some Roman coins were found where the Ditton railway station stands today. In the 9th century Vikings invaded the country and Widnes was at the extreme south of the Danelaw. The River Mersey derives its name from the Anglo-Saxon maeres ea, which means boundary river, the boundary being that between the Danelaw and the Saxon kingdom of Mercia. At the beginning of the 20th century, it was believed that some earthworks on Cuerdley Marsh had been constructed by the Vikings but an archaeological investigation in the 1930s found nothing to confirm this.

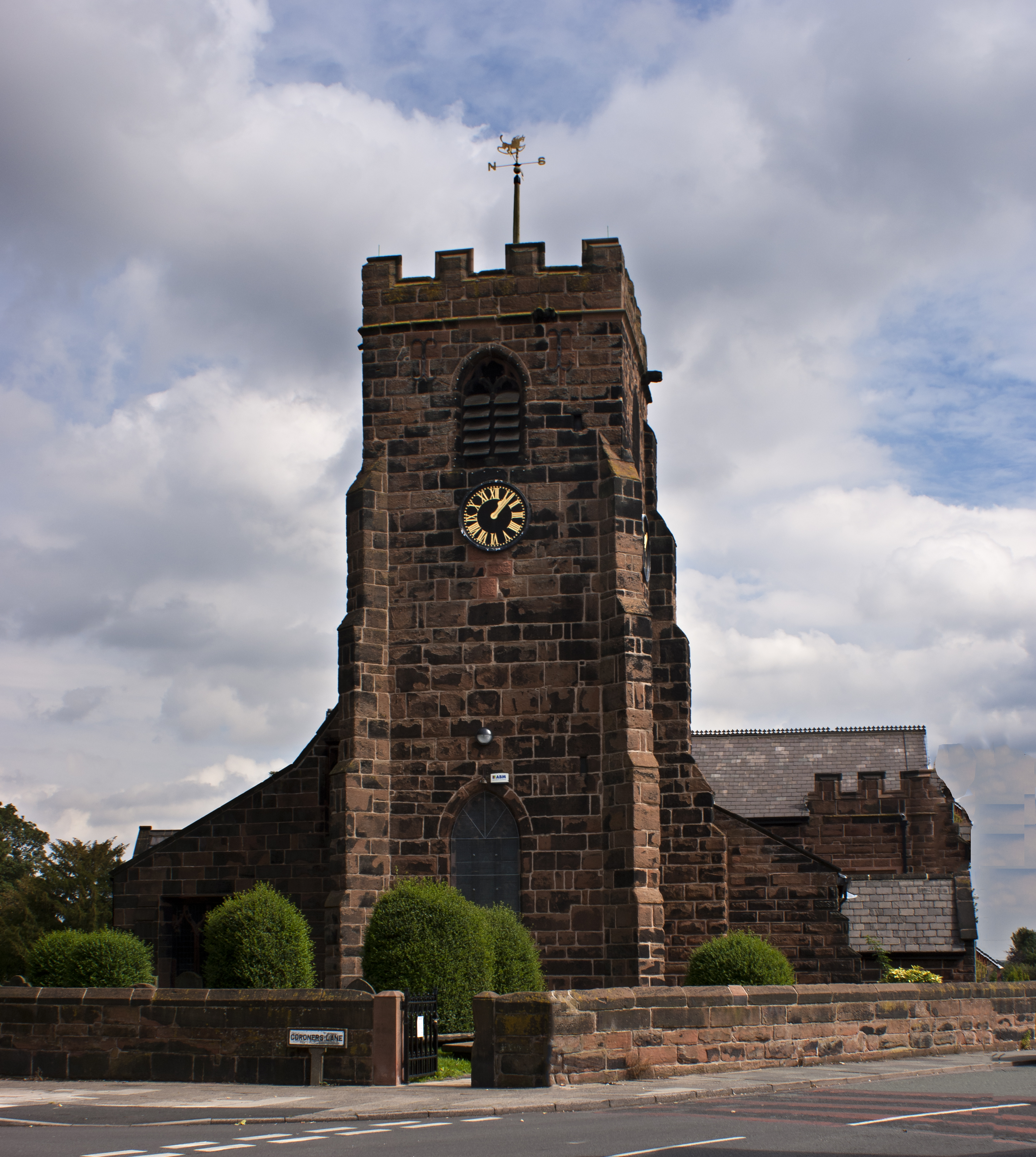
St Luke's Church in Farnworth

Following the Norman conquest of England, William the Conqueror granted the Earldom of Lancaster to Roger the Poitevin who in turn granted the barony of Widnes to Yorfrid. Yorfrid had no sons and his elder daughter married William fitz Nigel, the second Baron of Halton. On Yorfrid's death the barony of Widnes passed to that of Halton. The current St Luke's, a Norman church, was built in Farnworth. Its date of origin is uncertain but it is likely to be around 1180. In 1500 the South Chapel was added to the church and in 1507 a grammar school was established in Farnworth; both were endowments from Bishop William Smyth. Until the middle of the 19th century, the area consisted of the scattered hamlets of Farnworth, Appleton, Ditton, Upton and Woodend. Nearby were the villages of Cronton and Cuerdley.

In the 1750s the Sankey Canal was constructed. This linked the area of St. Helens with the River Mersey at Sankey Bridges, near Warrington and was in operation by 1757. It was extended to Fiddler's Ferry in 1762 and then in 1833 a further extension to Woodend was opened. In the same year the St Helens and Runcorn Gap Railway was opened. The railway connected St Helens with an area in Woodend which was to become known as Spike Island. The termini of the canal and railway were adjacent and here Widnes Dock, the world's first railway dock, was established. Despite these transport links and the emergence of the chemical industry at nearby Runcorn and elsewhere in the Mersey Valley, the Industrial Revolution did not arrive at Widnes until 14 years later, with the arrival at Spike Island of John Hutchinson.

=== Coming of the chemical industry ===
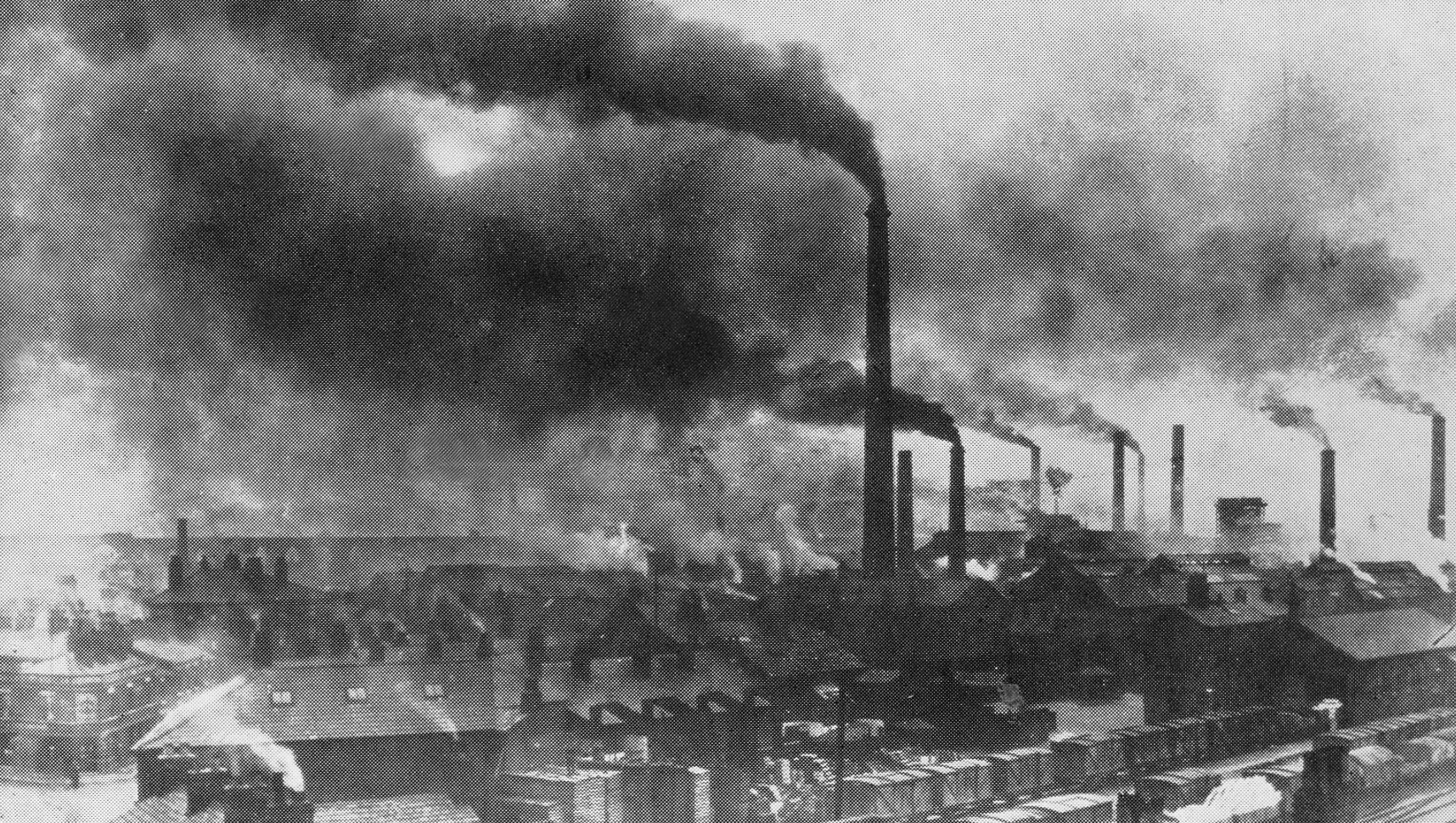
Widnes during the late 19th century demonstrating the degree of pollution in the town

John Hutchinson built his first factory in 1847 on land between the Sankey Canal and the railway making alkali by the Leblanc process. This was an ideal site for the factory because all the raw materials could be transported there by the waterways and railway, and the finished products could similarly be transported anywhere else in the country or overseas. Further chemical factories were soon built nearby by entrepreneurs including John McClellan, William Gossage, Frederic Muspratt, Holbrook Gaskell and Henry Deacon. The town grew rapidly as housing and social provision was made for the factory workers. Soon the villages of Farnworth, Appleton, Ditton and Upton were subsumed within the developing town of Widnes. Woodend became known as West Bank. The substances produced included soap, borax, soda ash, salt cake and bleaching powder. Other industries developed including iron and copper works. The town became heavily polluted with smoke and the by-products of the chemical processes. In 1888 the town was described as "the dirtiest, ugliest and most depressing town in England" and in 1905 as a "poisonous hell-town".

Their especial ugliness is, however, never more marked than when the spring is making beautiful every nook and corner of England, for the spring never comes hither. It never comes because, neither at Widnes nor St. Helens, is there any place in which it can manifest itself. The foul gases which, belched forth night and day from the many factories, rot the clothes, the teeth, and, in the end, the bodies or the workers, have killed every tree and every blade of grass for miles around.

— Robert Sherard, The White Slaves of England, Being True Pictures of Certain Social Conditions in the Kingdom of England in the Year 1897, p. 47

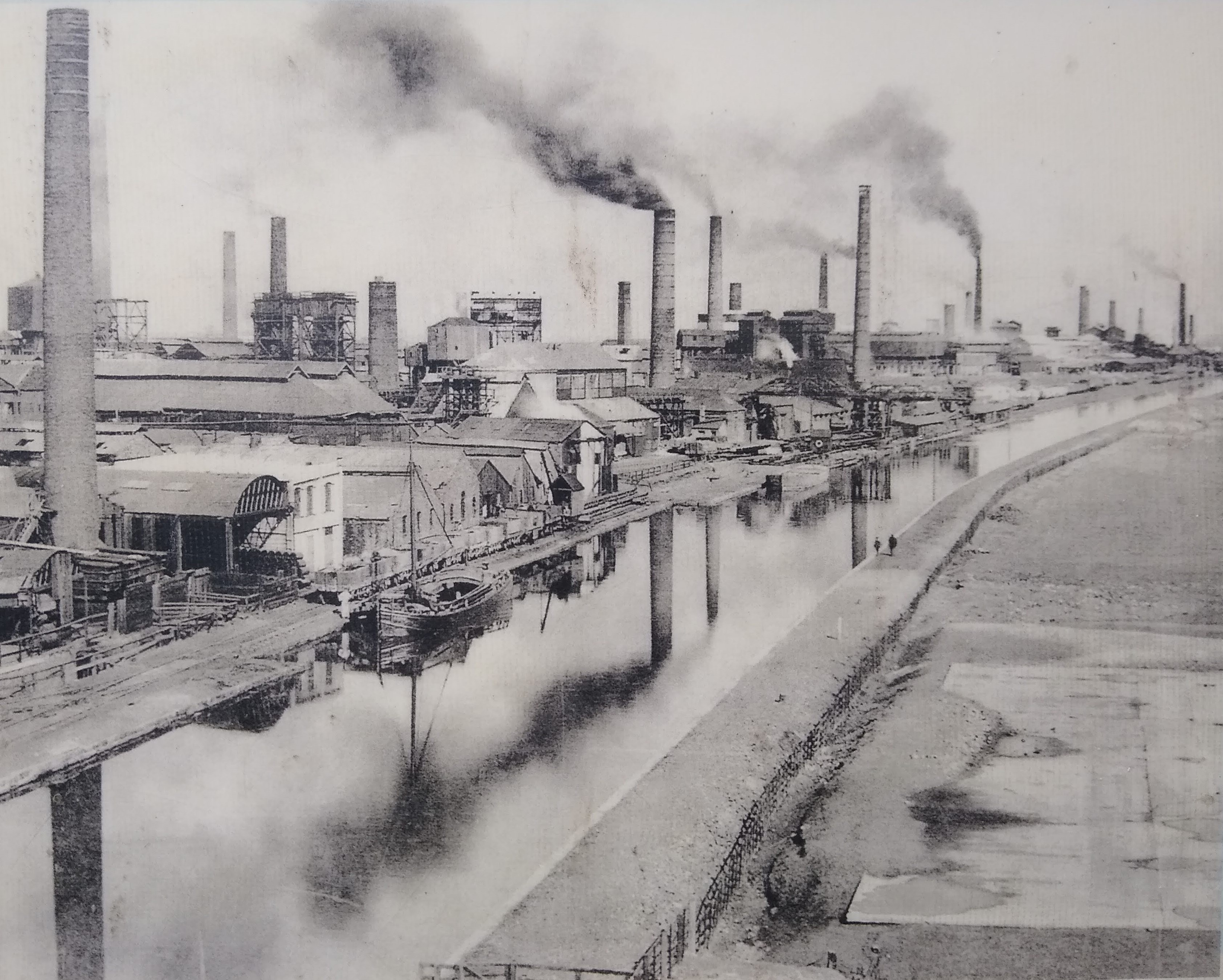
Spike Island c. 1900

The demand for workers meant that, in addition to people from other areas of the United Kingdom, including Ireland, large numbers of workers came from other countries. From the late 1880s significant numbers arrived from Poland and Lithuania who were fleeing from persecution and poverty in their home countries. Immigrants also came from other areas, in particular Wales. In 1890 the chemical companies making alkali by the Leblanc process combined to form the United Alkali Company, later one of the constituent companies of ICI. This involved practically all of the chemical industries in Widnes, which was considered to be the principal centre of the new company. However, during the 1890s the chemical business in Widnes went into decline as more efficient methods of making alkali were developed elsewhere.

=== Recent history ===
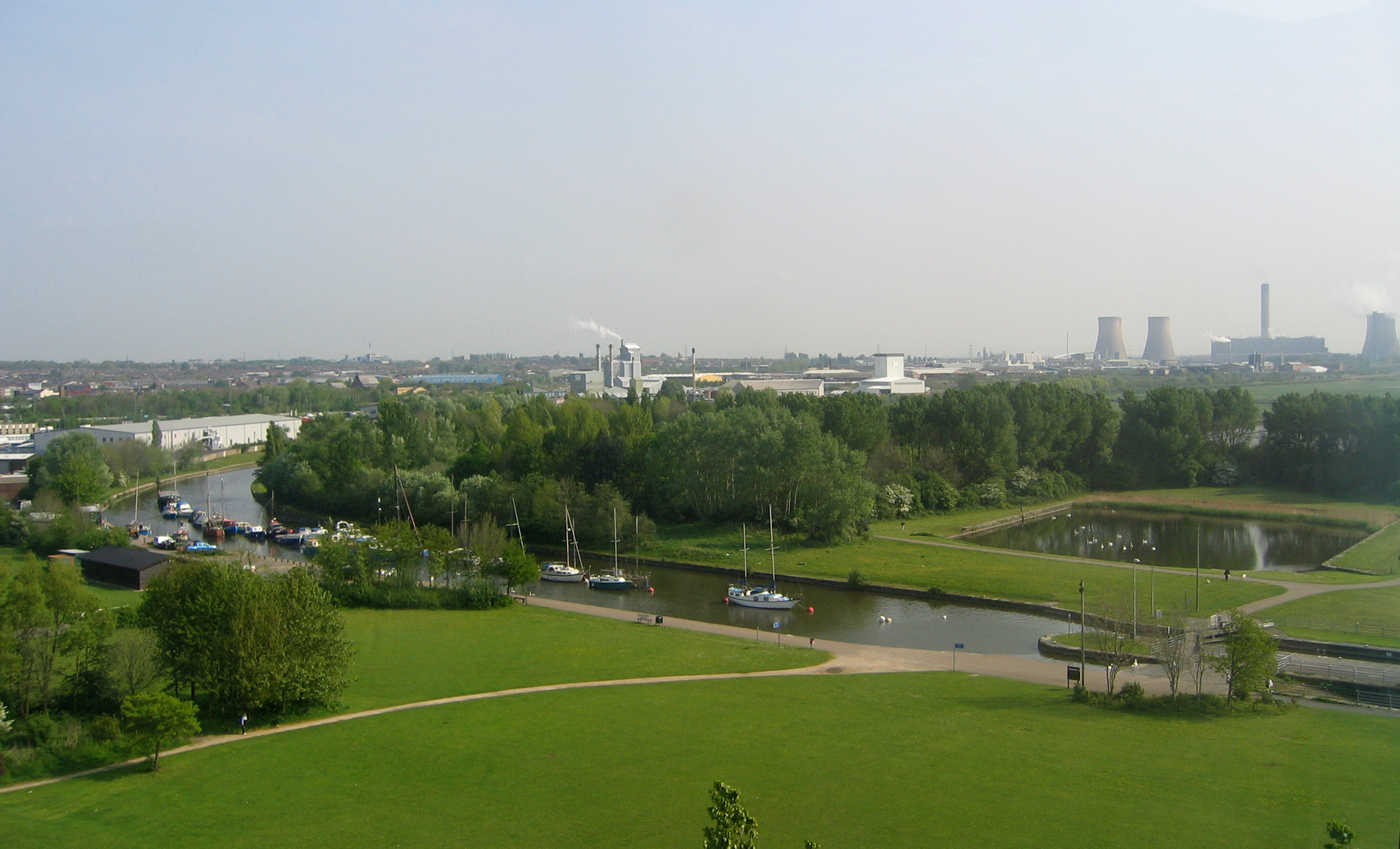
Spike Island was the location of the first chemical factory and is now a greenspace

During the early decades of the 20th century, there was a revival in the local economy, particularly as the United Alkali Company began to manufacture new products. Improvements were being made to the structure of the town, in particular the opening of the Widnes–Runcorn Transporter Bridge in 1905 which gave the first direct link over the Mersey for road traffic. In 1909 the town became the first in Britain to have a regular covered-top double-decker bus service.

By 1919 the health of the residents of the town was improving. In the 1920s, and 1930s there was further diversification of the chemical industry and the products it manufactured. Slums were being replaced by more and better homes. After World War II more slums were cleared and there was ongoing growth and variation in the chemical industry. By the 1950s the town had 45 major chemical factories.

In 1961 the Silver Jubilee Bridge opened as free crossing, replacing the outdated Transporter Bridge. In 2017 a further crossing, the Mersey Gateway Bridge, opened to relieve congestion. This crossing was tolled. When the Mersey Gateway Bridge was opened, the Silver Jubilee Bridge was closed for maintenance. Now both bridges are operating, but as tolled crossings.

In recent years many of the old heavy chemical factories have closed to be replaced by more modern factories. Much of the land previously polluted by the old dirty chemical processes has been reclaimed, and there have been improvements in the cleanliness and environment of the town.

== Governance ==
=== Local government ===
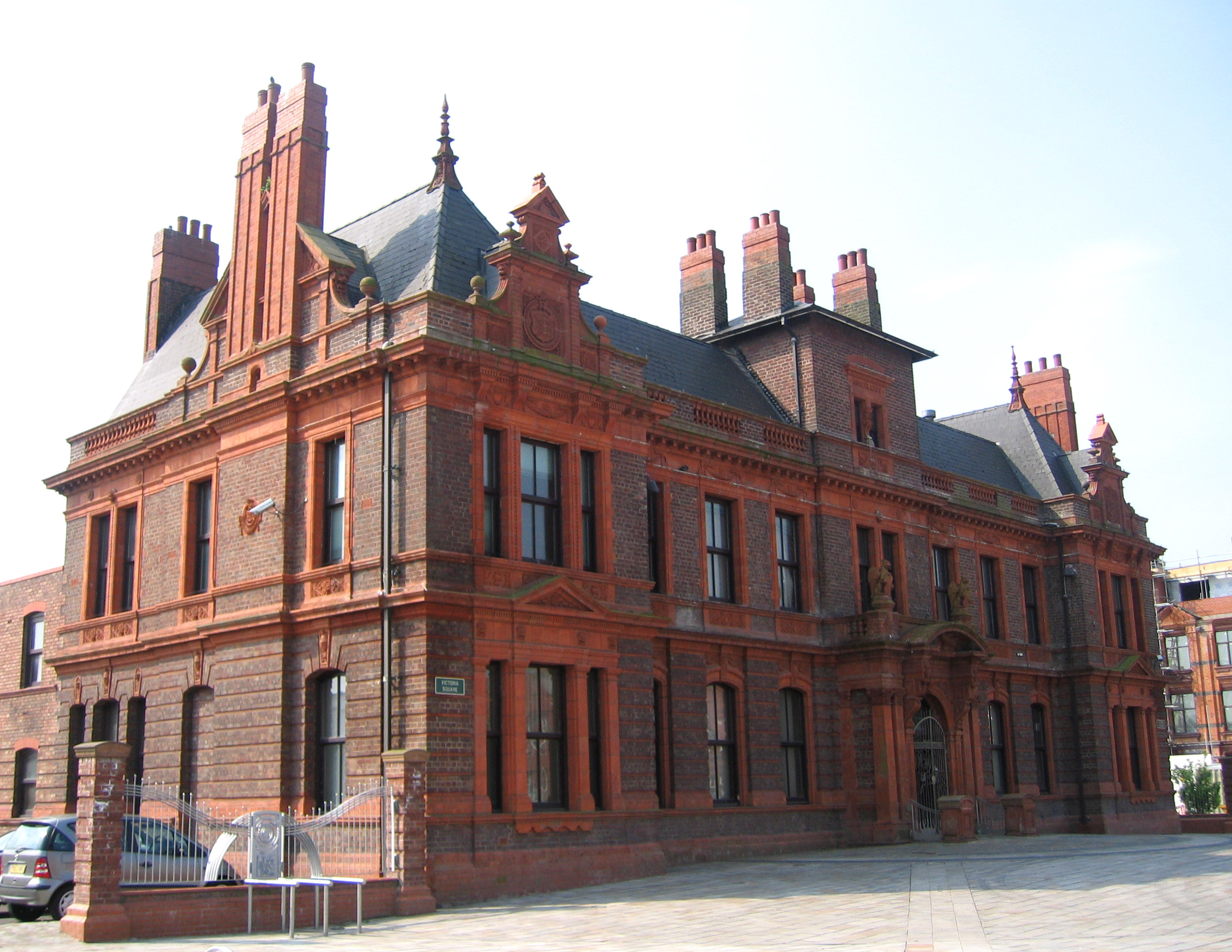
Widnes Town Hall, now a listed building, was once the political centre of the town

Widnes is unparished with the exception of Halebank. The local authority is Halton Borough Council for which the town is divided into nine electoral wards, each electing three councillors.

From Saxon times Widnes was part of the hundred of West Derby in Lancashire. Modern local government in the town of Widnes began with the creation of the Widnes Local Board in 1865, prior to which the town had been part of the administrative district of Prescot. In 1892, the town received a charter of incorporation forming the Municipal Borough of Widnes. In 1974, as part of the Local Government Act 1972, Widnes Borough Council was abolished and its territory amalgamated with Runcorn to form the borough of Halton within the county of Cheshire. In 1998 the borough of Halton became a unitary authority. In 2009, the council entered into an agreement with the five metropolitan district councils of Merseyside to form the Liverpool City Region.

=== Westminster representation ===
Widnes is in the Widnes and Halewood constituency for representation in the House of Commons. The seat has been held by Derek Twigg of the Labour Party since its creation for the 2024 general election.

Between 1983 and 2024, Widnes was in the Halton constituency which was held by the Labour Party since its creation. Widnes first became a parliamentary constituency and elected its first Member of Parliament in 1885.

== Geography ==
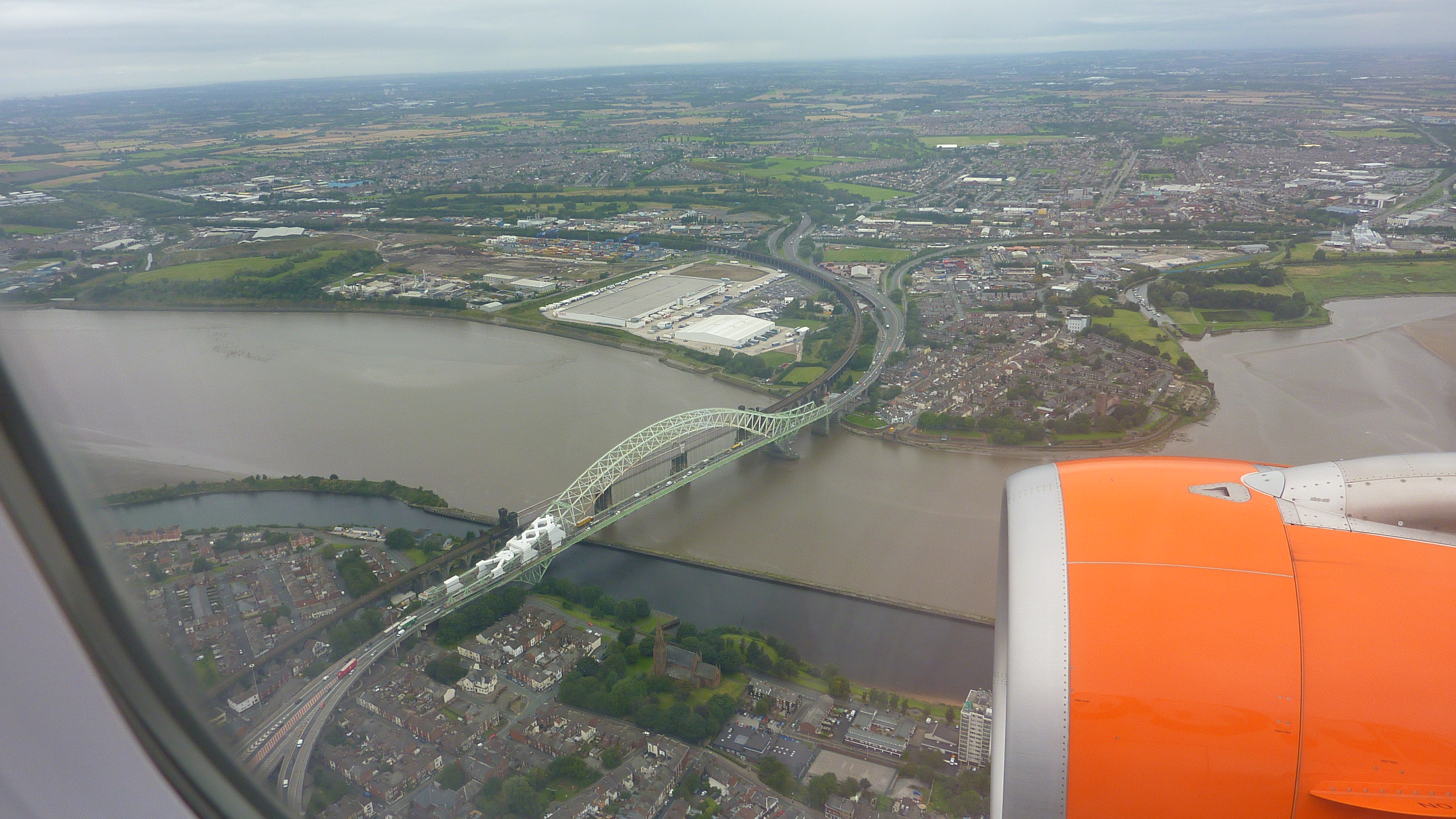
Aerial view of Widnes from the Runcorn Gap

Widnes is situated on the north bank of the River Mersey. The whole town is low-lying with some slightly higher areas in Farnworth and Appleton. To the south of the town a spur projecting into the river forms the West Bank area of Widnes; together with a spur projecting northwards from Runcorn these form Runcorn Gap, a narrowing of the River Mersey. Runcorn Gap is crossed by Runcorn Railway Bridge, carrying the Liverpool branch of the West Coast Main Line, and the Silver Jubilee Bridge, carrying the A533 road which then curves in a westerly direction towards Liverpool becoming the A562. The density of housing is generally high but there are some open green areas, including Victoria Park in Appleton and two golf courses which are geographically near the centre of the urban development. Most of the chemical and other factories are close to the north bank of the River Mersey. A second road bridge, the Mersey Gateway, opened in October 2017, carrying a six-lane road connecting Runcorn's Central Expressway with Speke Road and Queensway in Widnes.

Drainage of the Widnes area is into the Mersey via Ditton, Steward's and Bower's Brooks. The bedrock of the area is rock from the Sherwood sandstone group. There are a few outcrops of sandstone but elsewhere the bedrock is covered by drift. Most of this consists of till except near the bank of the Mersey where it is recent alluvium.

When borings were made in the 1870s prior to the building of chemical works a deep gorge measuring around 100 feet (30 m) was found in the bedrock which was filled with glacial deposits. From this it was concluded that before the Ice Age the Mersey had flowed in a more northerly course, and when it was blocked by glacial deposits it had made a new channel through Runcorn Gap.

Being close to the west coast and the Irish Sea, the climate is generally temperate with few extremes of temperature or weather. The mean average temperature in the years 1971 to 2000 was 9.4 to 9.7 °C, which was slightly above the average for the United Kingdom as was the average amount of annual sunshine at 1391 to 1470 hours. The average annual rainfall was 741 to 870 mm, which was slightly below the average for the UK. The average number of days in the year when snow is on the ground is 0 to 6, which is low for the United Kingdom. The average number of days of air frost is 2 to 39, which is also low.

== Demography ==
=== Population growth ===
Widnes was a small settlement until industrialisation in the nineteenth century which led to significant population growth.

Population growth of Widnes since 1801
Year	Population	Change as %
1801	1,063	—
1811	1,204	+13.3%
1821	1,439	+19.5%
1831	2,209	+53.5%
1841	3,211	+45.4%
1851	3,211	
1861	6,905	+115.0%
1871	14,359	+108.0%
1881	24,935	+73.7%
1891	30,011	+20.4%
1901	28,580	−4.8%
1911	34,541	+20.9%
1921	38,860	+12.5%
1931	40,619	+4.5%
1939	40,347	−0.6%
1951	48,795	+20.9%
1961	52,168	+6.9%
1971	56,953	+9.2%
1981	54,478	−4.3%
1991	55,708	+2.3%
2001	55,686	−0.0%
2011	61,464	+10.4%
2021	62,400	+1.5%

=== Religion ===
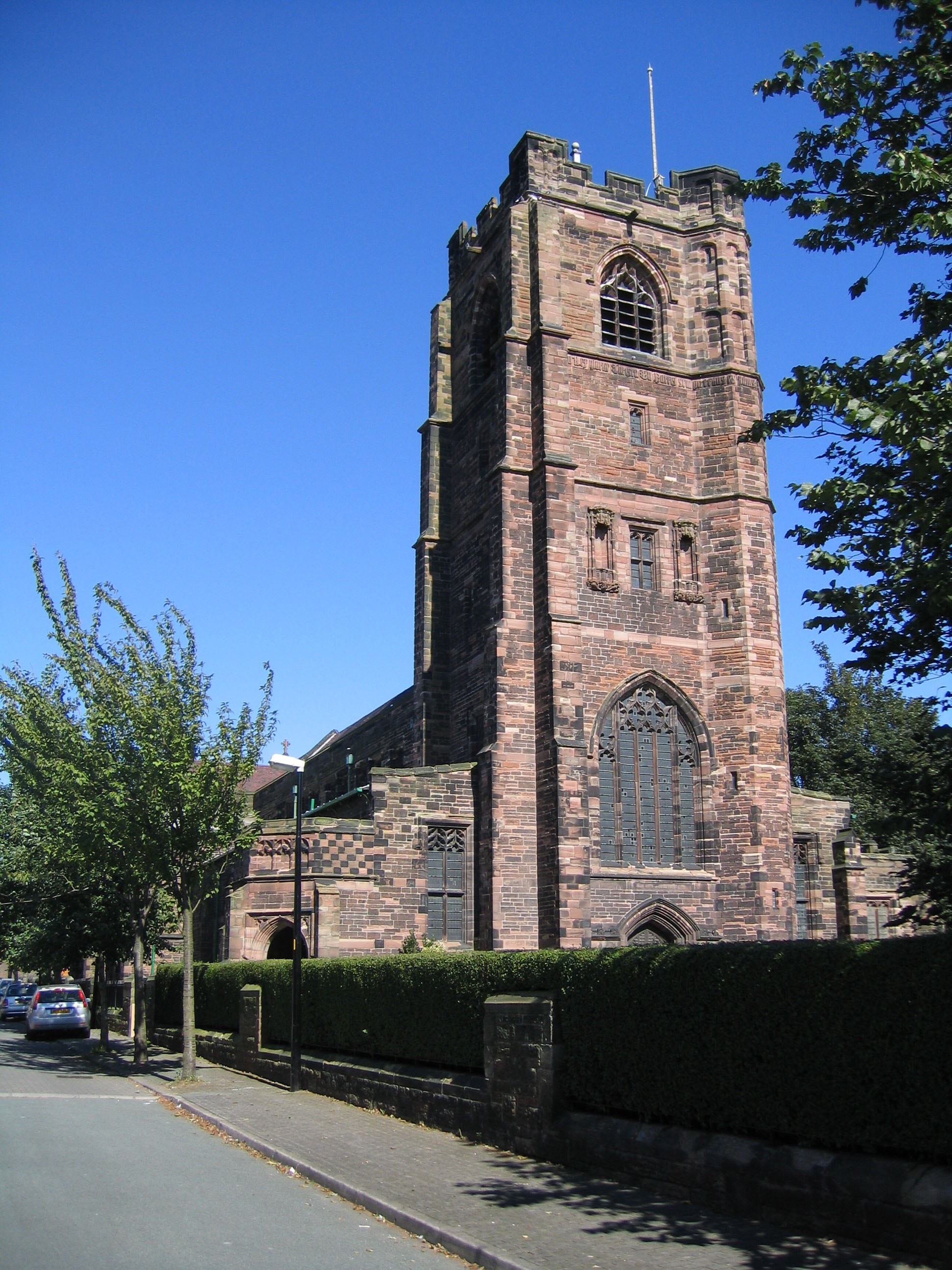
St Mary's Church, West Bank

In the 2021 census, of the people living in Widnes, 64.3% declared themselves to be Christian, higher than the national average in England of 46.3% but down from 79.9% in 2011. 29.5% stated that they had "no religion" and 4.7% made no religious claims. Those stating their religions as Buddhist, Hindu, Jewish, Islam, Sikh or other amounted to 1.5%.

The Anglican churches are administered by the Diocese of Liverpool. The longest established church is St Luke's Church, Farnworth. The other Anglican churches are St Mary's in West Bank, St Paul's in Victoria Square, St John's in Greenway Road and St Ambrose in Halton View Road. The Anglicans share the building of St Michael's in Ditchfield Road with Hough Green Methodist Church. The Anglicans also share the building of All Saints' in Hough Green Road with the Catholic Church of St Basil's.

The Roman Catholic churches in Widnes are part of the Archdiocese of Liverpool. There are four churches in Widnes, namely St Bede's in Appleton, St John Fisher in Moorfield Road, St Michael's in St Michael's Road, and St Basils in Hough Green Road. Owing to a shortage of Catholic Priests and the "Leaving Safe Harbours" project in effect throughout the Archdiocese St Marie's was closed, the last Mass was celebrated on 6 January 2007. The church is a listed building, but it has been placed on the Buildings at Risk list by the campaign group Save Britain's Heritage and was identified by the Victorian Society on their 2008 annual list as being one of the ten most endangered Victorian buildings in Britain. Our Lady of Perpetual Succour in Mayfield Avenue, St Marie's in Lugsdale Road, St Pius X in Sefton Avenue and St Raphael's in Liverpool Road all closed and were deconsecrated by 2013.

Trinity Methodist Church is in Peelhouse Lane and there are Methodist churches in Farnworth and Halebank. There is a Baptist church in Deacon Road and an Evangelical Christian church in Ditton. The Foundry in Lugsdale Road is a Pentecostal church and the Jehovah's Witnesses have a Kingdom Hall in Moorfield Road. The Widnes National Spiritualist Church is in Lacey Street.

=== Ethnicity ===
In the 2021 census, of Widnes's 62,400 residents, 96.5% were White. Mixed/multiple ethnic groups made up 1.3%; Asian/Asian British/Asian Welsh 1.2%; Black/Black British/Black Welsh/Caribbean/African 0.4%; and Other ethnic group 0.5%. 97.3% had English as a first language.

== Economy ==
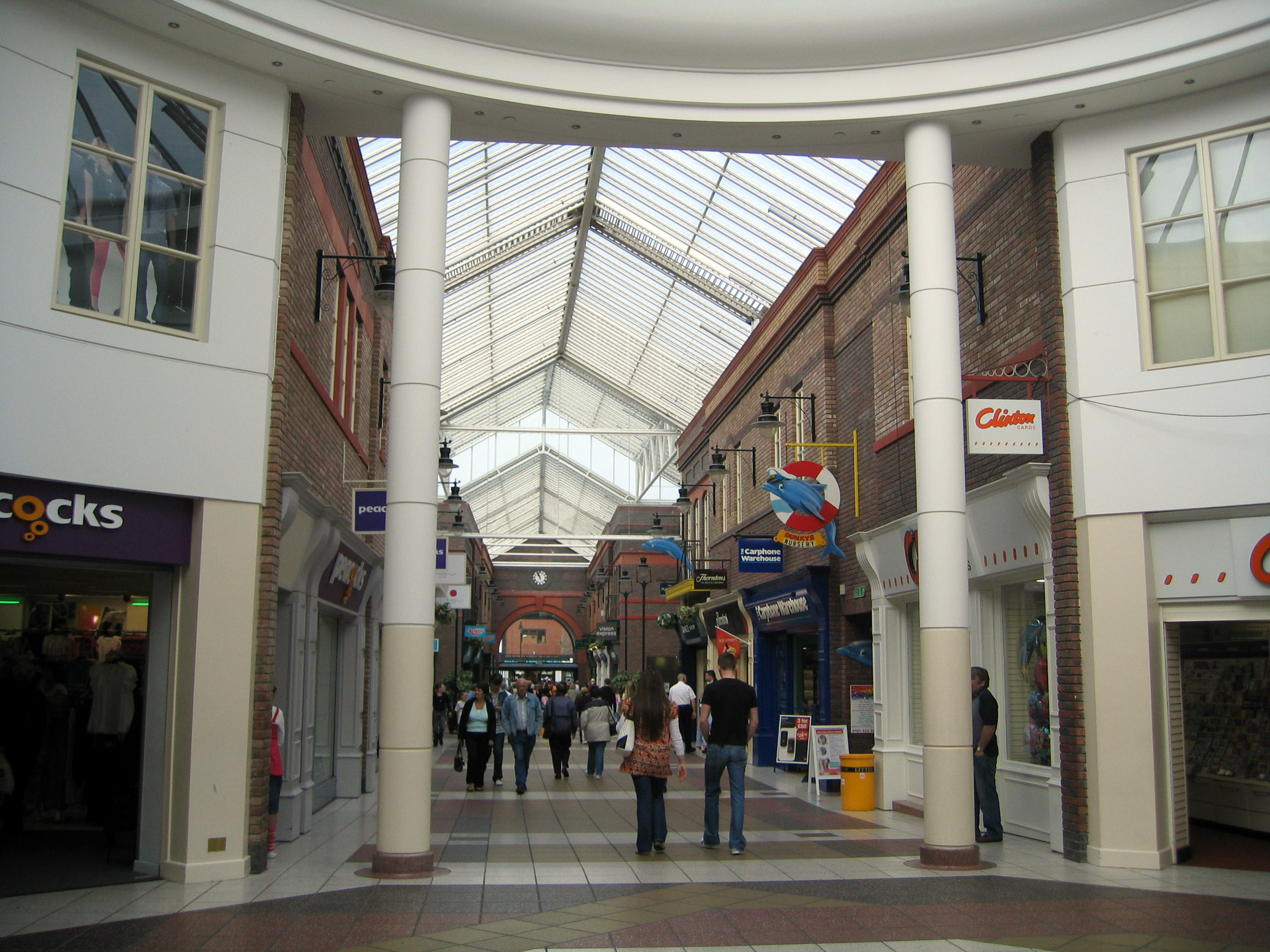
Greenoaks Centre

In 2020, the GVA for the Widnes Built-up Area was £1.18 billion.

Widnes is an industrial town and its major industry is still the manufacture of chemicals, although there has been diversification in recent years and the economy predominately relies on service industries. In 2006 a new freight park, known as the 3MG Mersey Multimodal Gateway, was opened in the West Bank area of the town. This provides a link for freight arriving by road, air or sea to be transferred to the rail network. In 2010 the first phase of Stobart Park, a "multimodal logistics service for warehousing and distribution", and part of the Stobart Group, was opened. This consists of a 520,000 square feet (48,000 m^{2}) refrigerated warehouse for Tesco.

In 2014 work began on the new Mersey Gateway bridge which was completed and open to the public in October 2017. A new six lane toll bridge over the River Mersey between the towns of Runcorn and Widnes was built to relieve the congested and ageing Silver Jubilee Bridge. The new bridge and access roads are a major strategic transport route linking the Liverpool city-region including Liverpool John Lennon Airport and the Port of Liverpool to North West England.

There has been considerable development of shopping areas in the town. The Greenoaks Centre, a mall which was opened in 1995 is adjacent to the long-established Widnes Market which has both a market hall and an open market. In Autumn 2011 construction began of a Tesco Extra 24-hour store. The glass fronted 120,000 sq ft store has been built on the old B&Q site next to Ashley Way and was opened in March 2012. The store was built on stilts allowing a car park to be built underneath the store for around 600 cars.

Employment by industry in 2011
Industry	Widnes (Resident Jobs)	Widnes (%)	Halton (%)	England (%)	Widnes - England Difference
G Wholesale and retail trade; repair of motor vehicles and motor cycles	5,549	19.3	18.7	15.9	3.4
C Manufacturing	3,311	11.5	12.5	8.8	2.7
H Transport and storage	1,835	6.4	6.9	5.0	1.4
E Water supply; sewerage, waste management and remediation activities	580	2.0	1.6	0.7	1.3
O Public administration and defence; compulsory social security	1,949	6.8	6.5	5.9	0.9
F Construction	2,331	8.1	7.4	7.7	0.4
D Electricity, gas, steam and air conditioning supply	269	0.9	0.8	0.6	0.3
N Administrative and support service activities	1,437	5.0	5.3	4.9	0.1
B Mining and quarrying	50	0.2	0.2	0.2	0.0
L Real estate activities	334	1.2	1.2	1.5	-0.3
A Agriculture, forestry and fishing	33	0.1	0.2	0.8	-0.7
Q Human health and social work activities	3,353	11.7	12.0	12.4	-0.7
J Information and communication	943	3.3	3.9	4.1	-0.8
R, S, T, U Other	1,175	4.1	3.8	5.0	-0.9
I Accommodation and food service activities	1,241	4.3	4.6	5.6	-1.3
K Financial and insurance activities	767	2.7	2.4	4.4	-1.7
P Education	2,348	8.2	7.7	9.9	-1.7
M Professional, scientific and technical activities	1,232	4.3	4.5	6.7	-2.4

== Landmarks ==
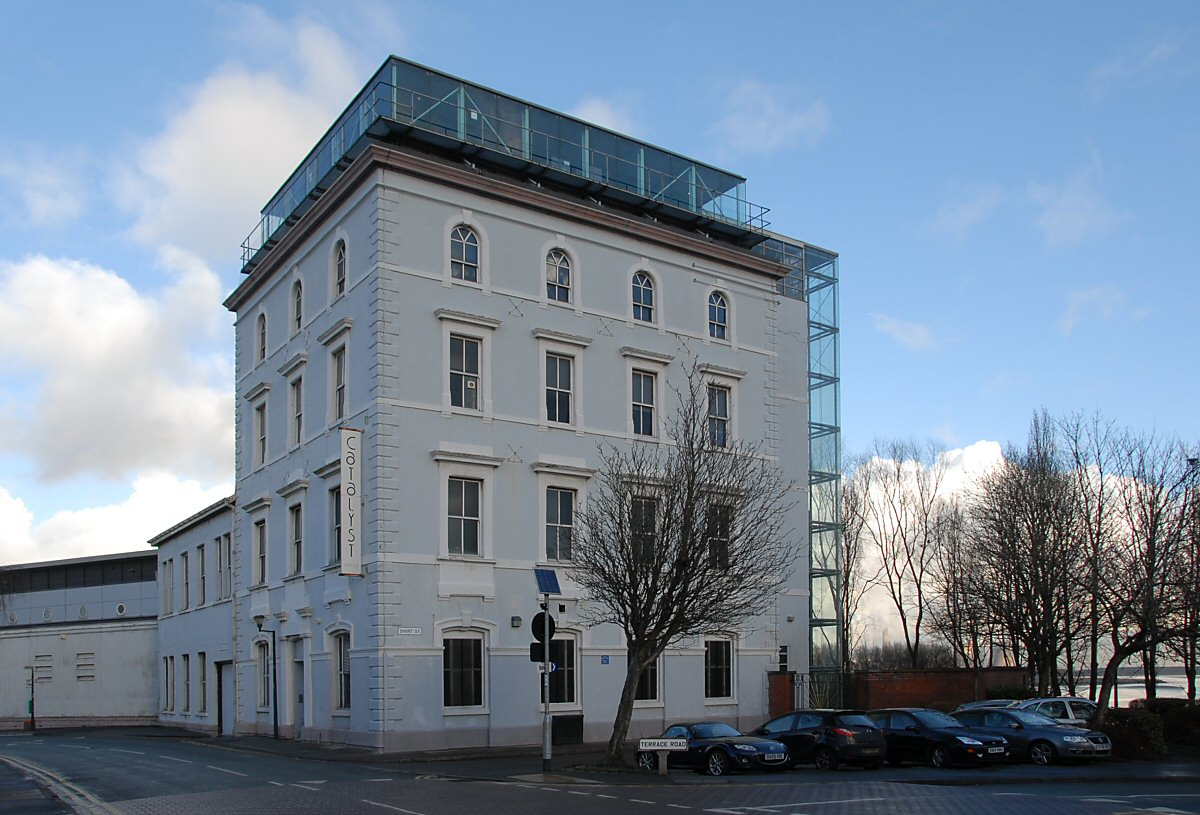
Catalyst Science Discovery Centre

The Silver Jubilee Bridge is a Grade II listed structure with Historic England. It was opened in 1961 and crosses to Runcorn. With a main arch spanning 330m, for many years it was the only crossing of the River Mersey West of Warrington. In 2017 the new Mersey Gateway bridge was opened to relieve congestion at the older bridge and allow easier road access to the Liverpool City region.

Reclamation of chemical factory sites and areas formerly polluted with chemical waste has given opportunities for developments. These include Victoria Promenade at West Bank, alongside the River Mersey, and Spike Island, now cleared of industry, which forms an open recreation area leading to footpaths along the former towpath of the Sankey Canal. Adjacent to Spike Island occupying John Hutchinson's former Tower Building is the Catalyst Science Discovery Centre.

There are a number of listed buildings, many of them in the more outlying areas but some are scattered throughout the town. The listed churches are the Anglican churches of St Luke's Church, Farnworth (and its adjacent bridewell), and St Mary's, West Bank, the Roman Catholic churches of St Michael's, St Marie's and St Bede's, and the two chapels in the cemetery. The railway stations of Widnes and Hough Green are listed, as are the former Widnes Town Hall and the former power house of the transporter bridge.

== Transport ==
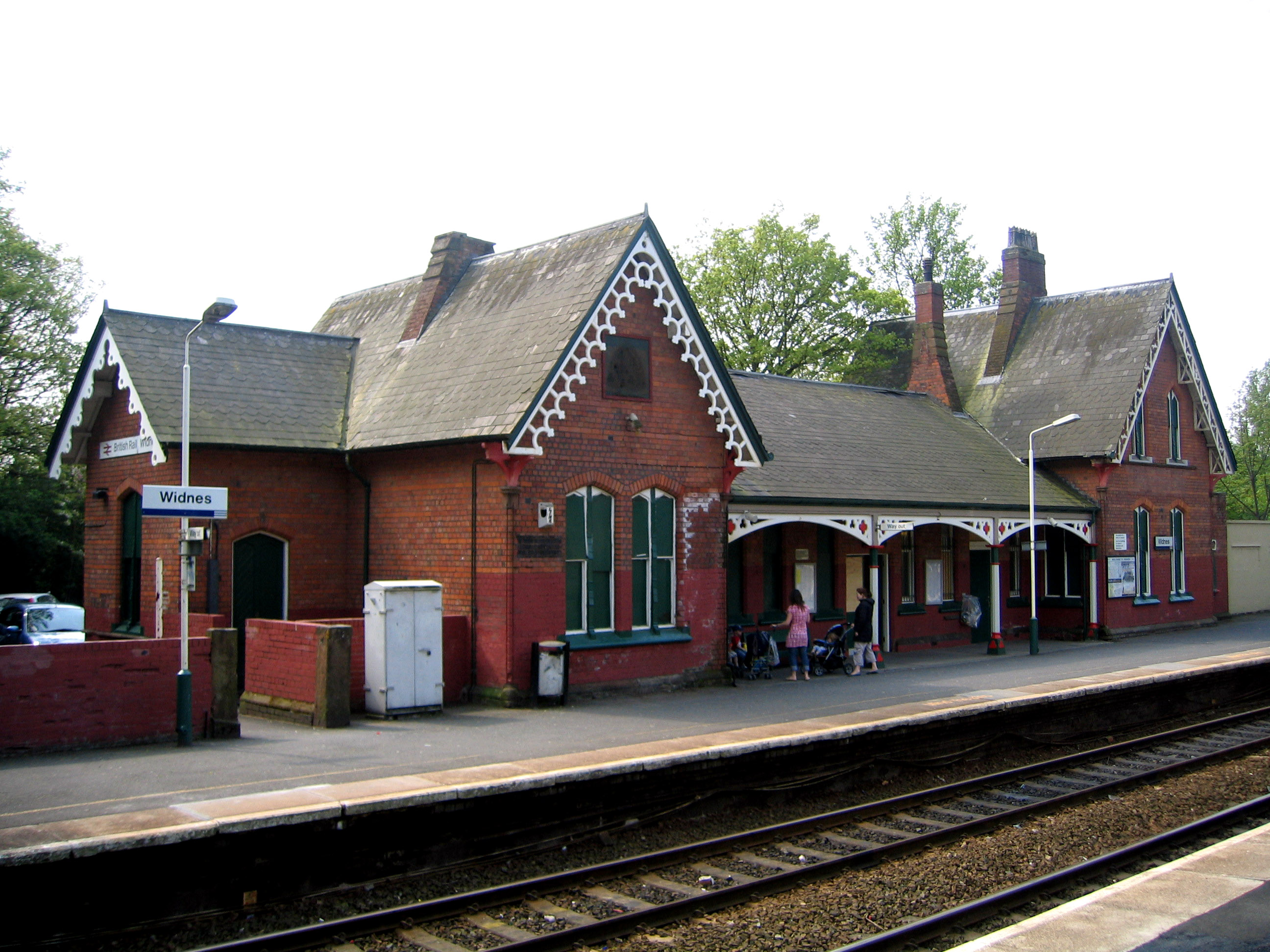
Widnes railway station

Widnes is on the southern route of the Liverpool to Manchester railway line. There are two stations in the town, Hough Green and Widnes from which services are operated by East Midlands Railway and Northern. Northern operate frequent services to Liverpool and Warrington from Hough Green and Widnes. East Midlands Railway link Widnes station at hourly intervals throughout the day to Liverpool, Manchester, Stockport, Sheffield, Nottingham and Norwich.

However passengers to and from London, the Midlands and the South are likely to use Runcorn station and make the short journey across the Mersey Gateway Bridge by bus or taxi.

Proposals for Merseyrail to be extended to Warrington have been set as Merseyrail are due some new Battery Electric Trains. This would open up new links as the trains would run on the pre-existing route via Widnes railway station.

The two main bus operators providing local services are Arriva North West and Warrington's Own Buses.

The A562 road passes through Widnes linking Liverpool to the west with Penketh to the east. The A557 road passes through the town linking Runcorn to the south, via the Silver Jubilee Bridge, with the M62 motorway, some 2.5 miles (4 km) to the north. The Mersey Gateway will replace the Silver Jubilee Bridge by mid-October 2017.

Widnes is 6 miles (10 km) from Liverpool John Lennon Airport and 25 miles (40 km) from Manchester Airport.

== Education ==
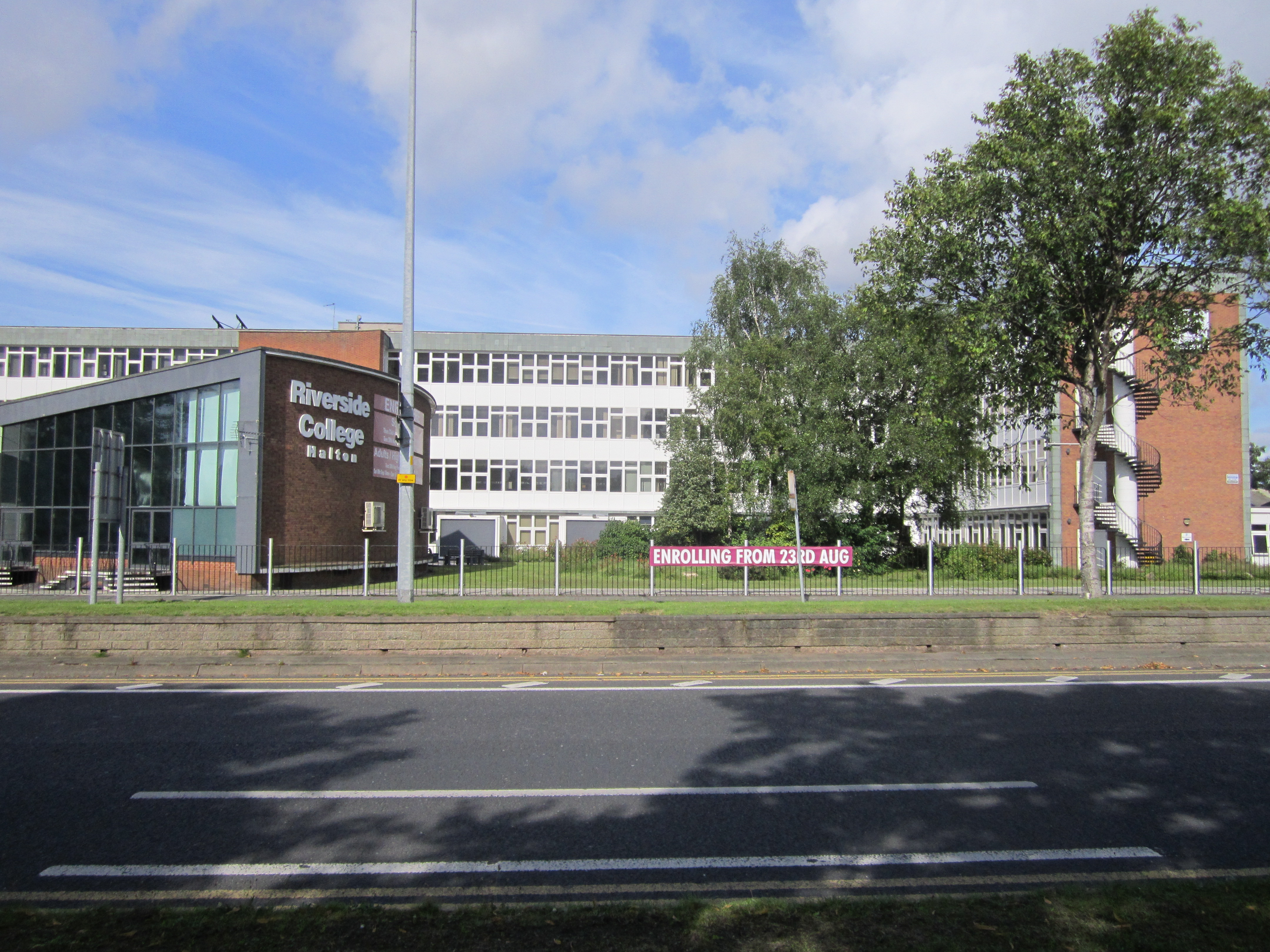
Riverside College in Widnes

There are nineteen primary schools in the town and three nursery schools. The three secondary schools are Saints Peter and Paul Catholic High School, Ormiston Chadwick Academy and Wade Deacon High School. The former colleges, Halton College and Widnes and Runcorn Sixth Form College, merged in 2006 to form Riverside College. There are three special schools. Also in Widnes is the Woodview Child Development Centre in Crow Wood Lane. Kingsway Learning Centre offers opportunities for Adult Learning, Basic Skills and Skills for Success.

As part of the Building Schools for the Future programme, Fairfield High School closed down in 2010 and merged with Wade Deacon High School. The school was founded in 1507 as Farnworth Grammar School by Bishop William Smyth and a school has been on the site since the 16th century. In the 1960s two separate-sex secondary schools amalgamated and the school took the title Fairfield High School from 1974 up until its closure. When it closed in August 2010, the schools pupils were transferred to Wade Deacon High School, though still operating from the same site. This continued until March 2013 when Wade Deacon High School's new build was completed; demolition of the old school began in August 2013 and was completed by the end of that year. The site is currently being developed into a housing estate and a cemetery.

== Sport ==
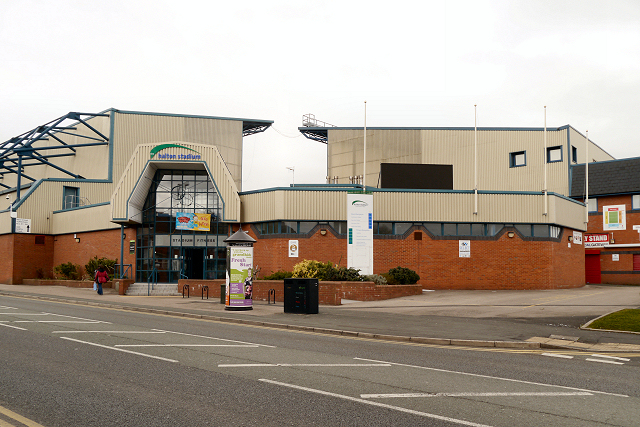
Halton Stadium, home of Widnes Vikings

The major sporting body in the town is Widnes Vikings Rugby League Football Club. Cup kings of the 1970s, and 1980s, they were World Club Champions in 1989, after defeating Australian side Canberra Raiders at Old Trafford. More recently, they were winners of the Northern Rail Cup in 2007 and 2009. Their home ground is DCBL Stadium in Lowerhouse Lane, which is owned and run by Halton Borough Council. In addition to being a sporting ground it has facilities for conferences and banqueting. In October 2007 the club was defeated in the National League One Grand Final. Following this, and because of the club's financial situation, its board decided to put it into administration. It was subsequently purchased by Steve O'Connor, a local businessman. The Widnes Vikings are in the Betfred Championship.

Widnes Rugby Union Football Club (otherwise known as "the wids"), are an amateur rugby union club based at Heath Rd and administered by volunteers. The players are all club members and pay subscriptions. The club welcomes and encourages the development of rugby within all sections of the local community by promoting links with local schools, local authorities and the Rugby Football Union constituency body.

Widnes Cricket Club was founded in 1865 and has its ground in Beaconsfield Road. Moorfield Sports & Social Club in Moorfield Road hosts sports including football, rugby league, cricket and bowls. At Highfield Road there is a private golf club.

Widnes Tennis Academy is located on Highfield Rd and shares an entrance with St Peter and Pauls School. This is a privately operated facility consisting of 3 in-door courts, six floodlit outside courts and a gym. It is a Beacon facility and has many links with schools, the local authority and the LTA to promote and develop tennis in the area. It is the home of Lane Tennis Club (established 1876) which has a number of men's, women's and junior teams playing competitively in the Warrington District League.

Widnes is home to a mixed martial arts (MMA) gym, the Wolfslair MMA Academy. This was established in 2004 by MMA fans and Anthony McGann and Lee Gwynn. Since then the academy has trained MMA fighters including former UFC middleweight champion Michael Bisping and former light heavyweight champion Quinton Jackson.

Widnes F.C. play their home matches at Halton Stadium. The club was founded in 2003 as The Dragons Amateur Football Club (The Dragons A.F.C.) and in 2012 it was acquired by the Rugby League team and became known as Widnes Vikings Football Club. In June 2014 the club became independent of the Rugby League team and changed its name to Widnes Football Club. After promotion to the North West Counties Premier Division at the end of the 2016–2017 season the team gained automatic promotion to the Evo-Stik Western Division at the end of the 2017–18 season, becoming the first side since AFC Fylde to achieve back-to-back promotions from the North West Counties Football League.

Since May 2013 there has been an ice hockey club Widnes Wild based at the Planet Ice ice rink which plays in the National Ice Hockey League Laidler Conference.

== Media ==
Local news and television programmes are provided by BBC North West and ITV Granada, the local television station TalkLiverpool also broadcasts to the area. Television signals are received from the Winter Hill TV transmitter.

Local radio stations are BBC Radio Merseyside, Heart North West, Capital Liverpool, Hits Radio Liverpool, Smooth North West, Greatest Hits Radio Liverpool & The North West, and Halton Community Radio, a community based station although has gone off air in 2025.

The town is served by the local newspapers, The Runcorn & Widnes Weekly News and Runcorn and Widnes World.

== Culture ==
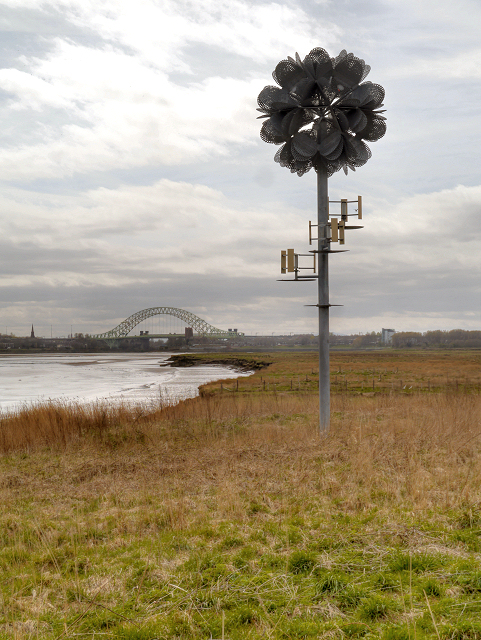
The Future Flower public art installation at Widnes Waterfront

The Queens Hall opened in 1957, it was originally Victoria Road Wesleyan Methodist Chapel. It was in use as a theatre and concert hall until the opening of The Brindley in Runcorn in 2004. The Queens Hall was demolished (December 2011 – February 2012). Adjacent to the hall, in Lacey Street, is the Queen's Hall Studio, originally built as a Sunday school in 1879. It was a venue for music and live performance but closed in 2004. After years of campaigning by the volunteer group Loose, and with the support of the Community Assets Fund/Big Lottery Fund and WREN and other donors, it re-opened on 17 April 2010.

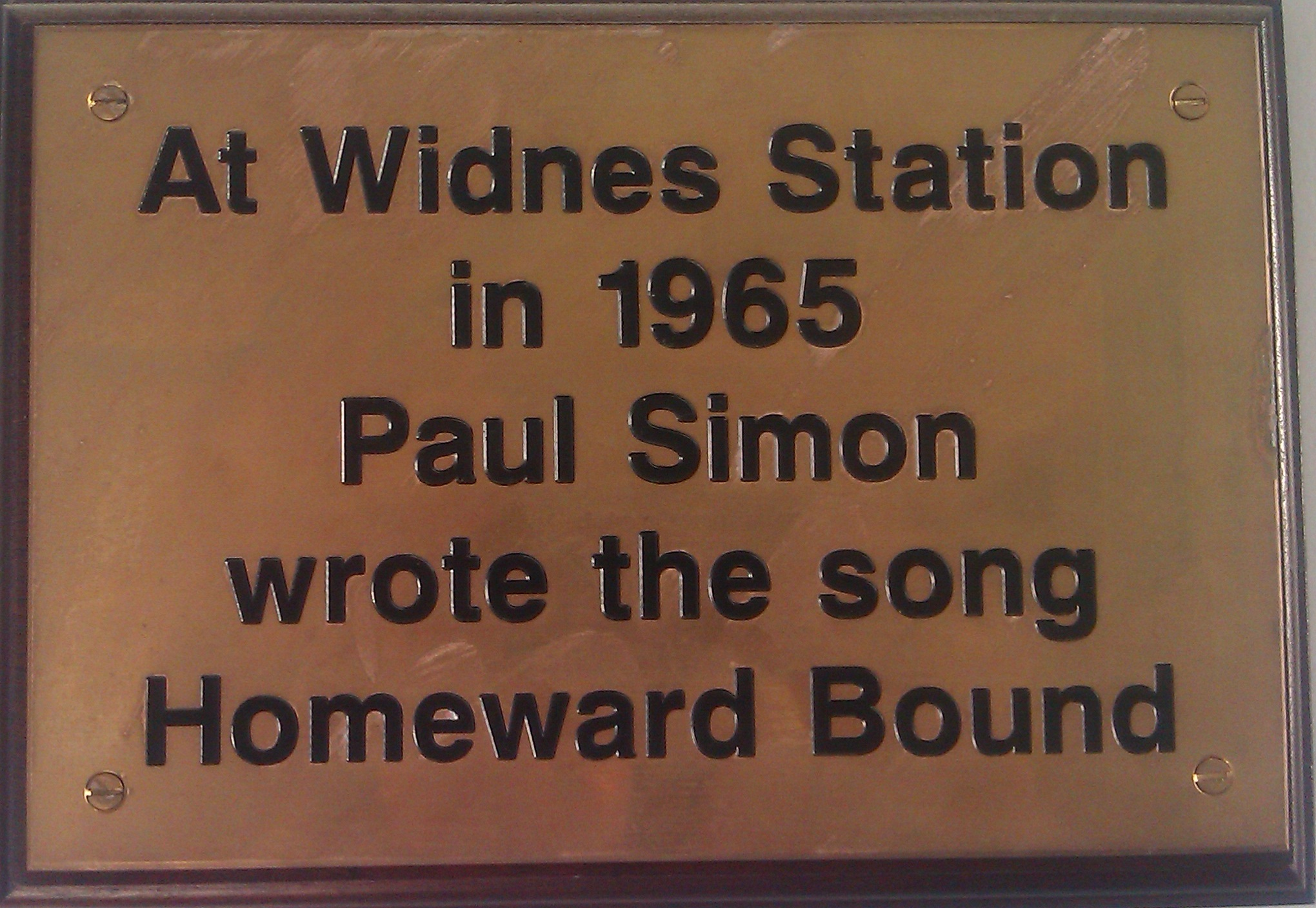
A plaque commemorating the song at the Widnes railway station

There is a tradition that the Simon & Garfunkel song "Homeward Bound" was written by American musician Paul Simon at a Widnes station. A quote from Paul Simon reads as follows: "If you know Widnes, then you'll understand how I was desperately trying to get back to London as quickly as possible. Homeward Bound came out of that feeling." Also, the song "The Stars of Track and Field" by Scottish indie rock band Belle and Sebastian, from the album If You're Feeling Sinister (1996) makes reference to the town of Widnes in the lyrics, as does the song "Watch Your Step" by Elvis Costello from his album Trust (1981).

== Community facilities ==
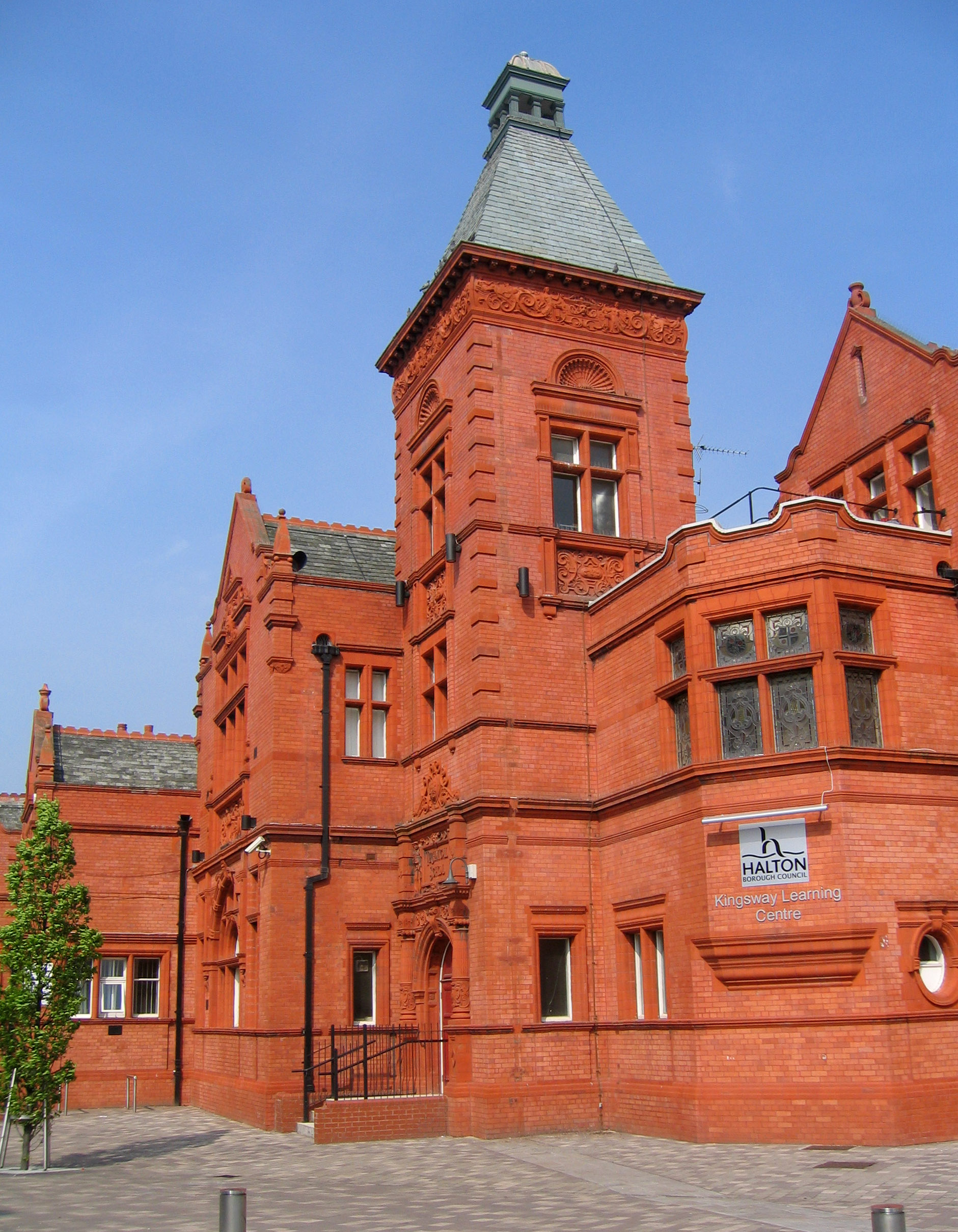
Widnes library and Kingsway Learning Centre

The main library in Victoria Square has been refurbished. In addition to the normal services provided by a library, this library holds a large collection of material relating to railways. There is a branch library in the Ditton area of the town.

The Queens Hall Studio, now known as the Studio, is in Lacey Street and is a community venue. Live music and theatre events take place, and the ACCESS ALL AREAS project is based there for young people interested in music and associated creative activities, funded by the Big Lottery Fund.

Victoria Park is in the Appleton area of the town and has a number of attractions, including a cafeteria and refreshment kiosk, a bandstand, model boating lake, tennis and basketball courts, bowling greens, a skateboarding facility, glasshouses with a pets' corner and a butterfly house. Hough Green Park is in the Ditton area of the town. Crow Wood Park is in the eastern part of Widnes and Sunnybank is a large area of open ground also in the eastern part of the town. There are a number of nature reserves. Pickerings Pasture is an area of wildflower meadows overlooking the River Mersey which was built on the site of a former household and industrial landfill. The other nature reserves in the town are Clincton Wood and Hale Road Woodlands.

Kingsway Leisure Centre, has a swimming pool and a gym in addition to a sports hall. There are a number of football, cricket and rugby league clubs in the town. St Michael's Golf Course was a municipal golf course which was built on reclaimed industrial waste land but high levels of arsenic have been found in the soil and at present it is closed. There is a private golf club in Highfield Road.

In October 2011 the Hive Leisure Park opened in a new development as part of the Widnes Waterfront. Its facilities include Reel Cinema, a five-screen multiplex cinema, a Frankie & Benny's bar and restaurant, Super Bowl UK Widnes containing a 16-lane ten-pin bowling centre, a children's play area, licensed bar, a Nando's restaurant, a Premier Inn, Brewers Fayre pub opened in February 2012 and also a brand new Ice Rink operated by Silverblades opened on 21 December 2012

=== Health ===
There is no hospital in Widnes. For acute medical care, patients ordinarily go to Whiston Hospital which is run by St Helens and Knowsley Teaching Hospitals NHS Trust or, alternatively, to Warrington Hospital which is run by Warrington and Halton Teaching Hospitals NHS Foundation Trust . Halton Clinical Commissioning Group is responsible for NHS services in the area. They established the Widnes Urgent Care Centre in 2015 to ease pressure on local accident and emergency units. General practitioner services are provided in health centres and in separate medical practices. There are dental practices providing a mixture of National Health Service and private dental care.

== Notable people ==
=== Science, business and industry ===
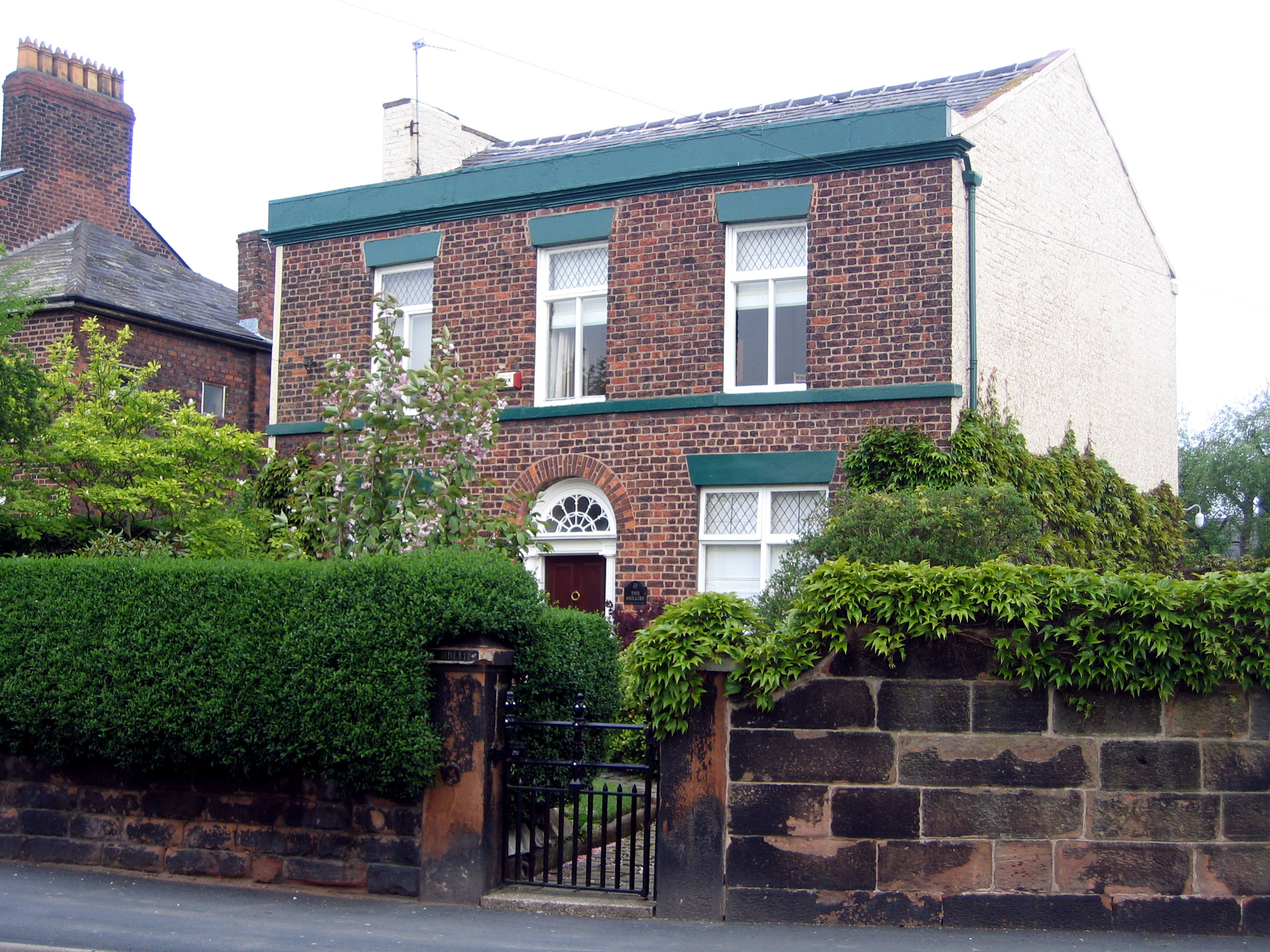
The Hollies, home of Ludwig Mond from 1867 to 1873

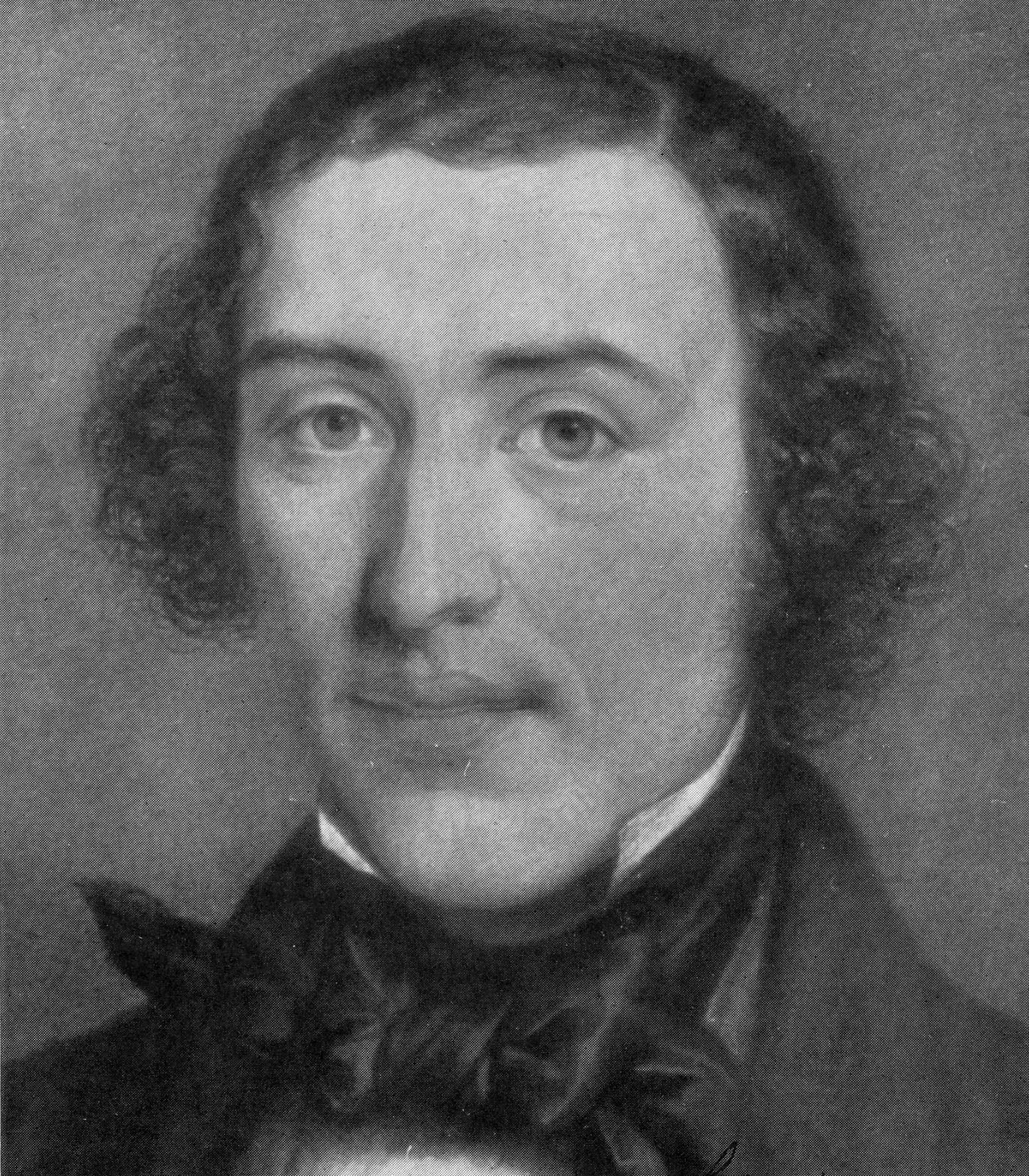
John Hutchinson, 1853

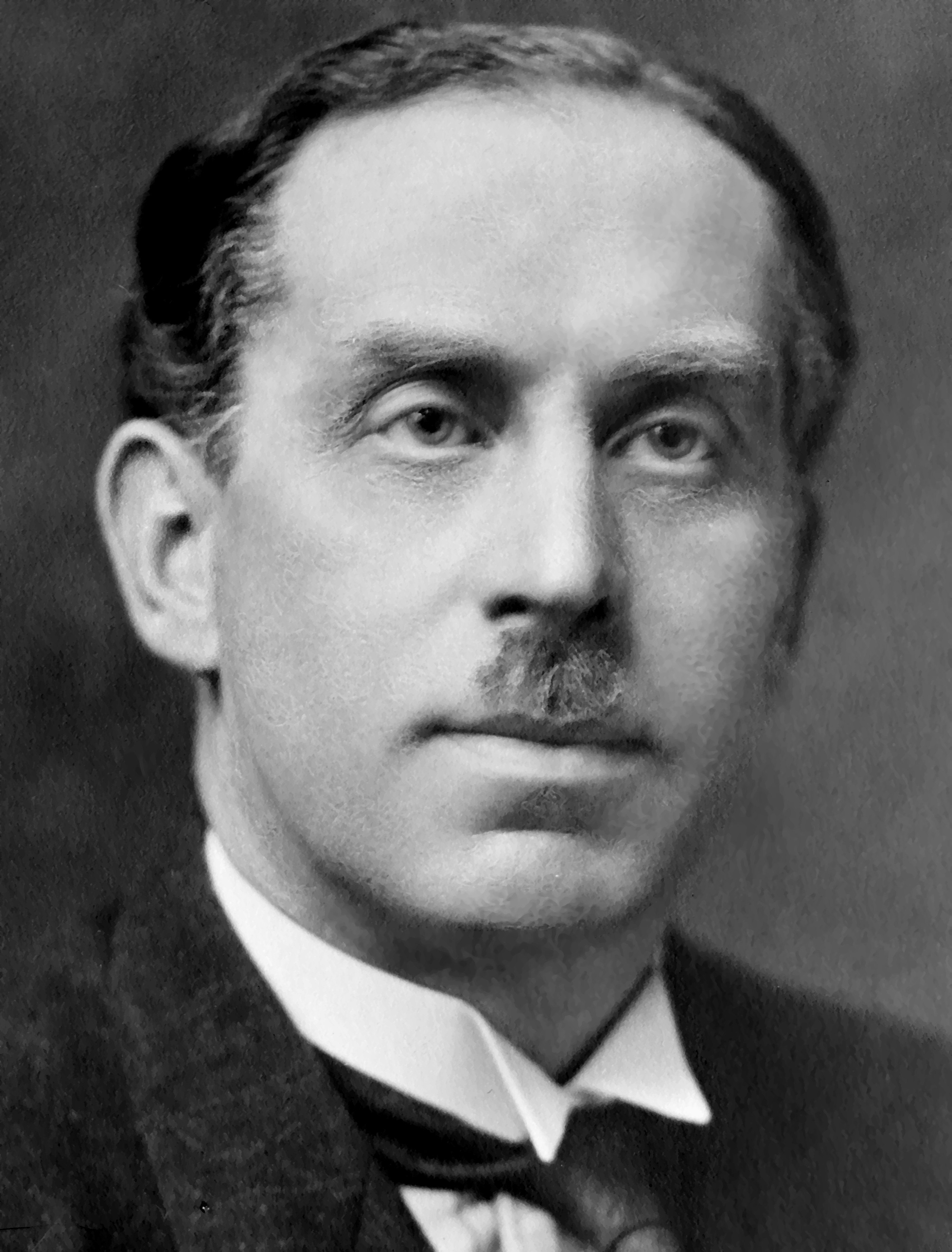
Charles Glover Barkla

James Atherton (1770–1838) was a Liverpool merchant and real estate developer. He played a significant role in transforming Everton into an affluent residential district in the early nineteenth century, and in association with his son-in-law, William Rowson, founded the seaside resort of New Brighton in 1830. He was born in Ditton in 1770, the son of William Atherton (1732–1807), a Yeoman, and his wife Margaret, née Houghton.

William Gossage (1799–1877) was a chemical manufacturer who established a soap making business in Widnes. During the late 19th century a number of prominent chemists and industrialists lived in Widnes. John McClellan (1810–1881) was a chemist and industrialist who established one of the first chemical factories in Widnes. Another was Ludwig Mond (1839–1909), co-founder of Brunner Mond. He lived in The Hollies, Farnworth and there his two sons were born, both of whom became notable. There were three generations of Holbrook Gaskells who were chemical industrialists. The first (1813–1909) was also an art and plant collector. The second (1846–1919) became a director of United Alkali Company and the third (1878–1951) was chief engineer of the United Alkali Company and was knighted.

Henry Deacon (1822–1876) was a chemist and industrialist who established a chemical factory in Widnes. Frederic Muspratt (1825–1872) was also a chemist and industrialist who established a chemical factory in Widnes. John Hutchinson (1825–1865) was a chemist and industrialist who established the first chemical factory in Widnes in 1847, it manufactured alkali by the Leblanc process. Henry Brunner (1838–1916) was an English chemist employed in 1861 by Hutchinson in his chemical business. Ferdinand Hurter (1844–1898) was a Swiss industrial chemist who joined Henry Deacon and Holbrook Gaskell at their alkali manufacturing business, Gaskell, Deacon & Co., in Widnes in 1867. Neil Mathieson (1823-–1906) was a Scottish chemist, he set up his own business, Matheison and Company in 1870 with Frederick Herbert Gossage, son of William Gossage. Sir John Brunner, 1st Baronet, (1842–1919) was also a British chemical industrialist at Hutchinson's alkali works in Widnes where he rose to the position of general manager.

Vero Charles Driffield (1848–1915) was a chemical engineer, he became an engineer at the Gaskell–Deacon Works in 1871. Sir Robert Mond (1867 in Farnworth – 1938) became a chemist and archaeologist and his younger brother Alfred Mond, 1st Baron Melchett (1868 in Farnworth – 1930) became an industrialist, financier and politician serving as a Liberal MP for Chester 1906–1910, for Swansea 1910 to 1918 and for Swansea West from 1918 to 1923.

Sydney Young, (1857 in Farnworth – 1937) was an academic English chemist. Charles Glover Barkla (1877 in Widnes – 1944) was the winner of the 1917 Nobel Prize in Physics for his work in X-ray spectroscopy. Charles Suckling (1920–2013) was a British chemist who first synthesised halothane, a volatile inhalational anesthetic in 1951, while working at the ICI Central Laboratory in Widnes. Gordon Rintoul (born 1955) was Director of the Catalyst Science Discovery Centre in Widnes between 1987 and 1998.

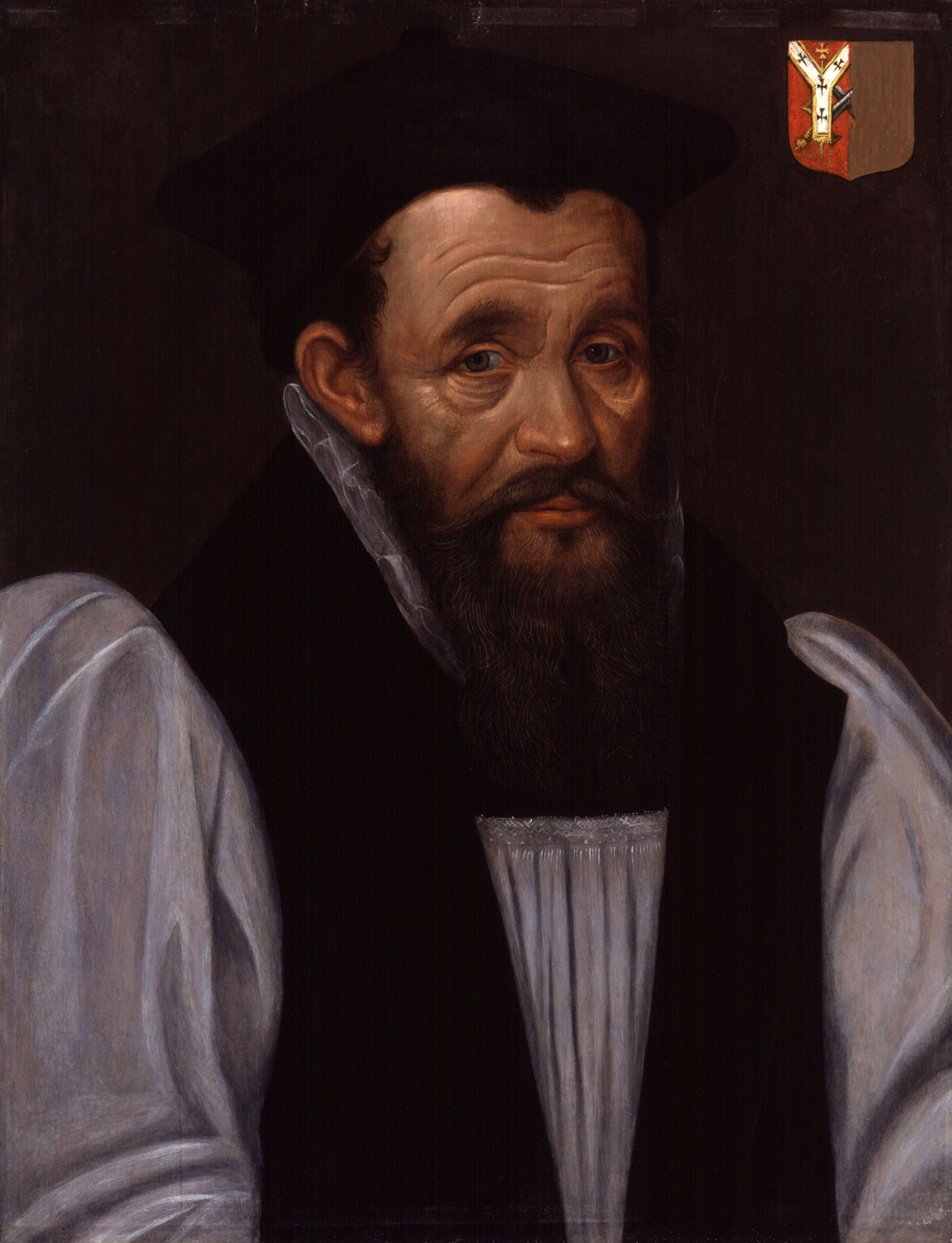
Richard Bancroft, Archbishop of Canterbury

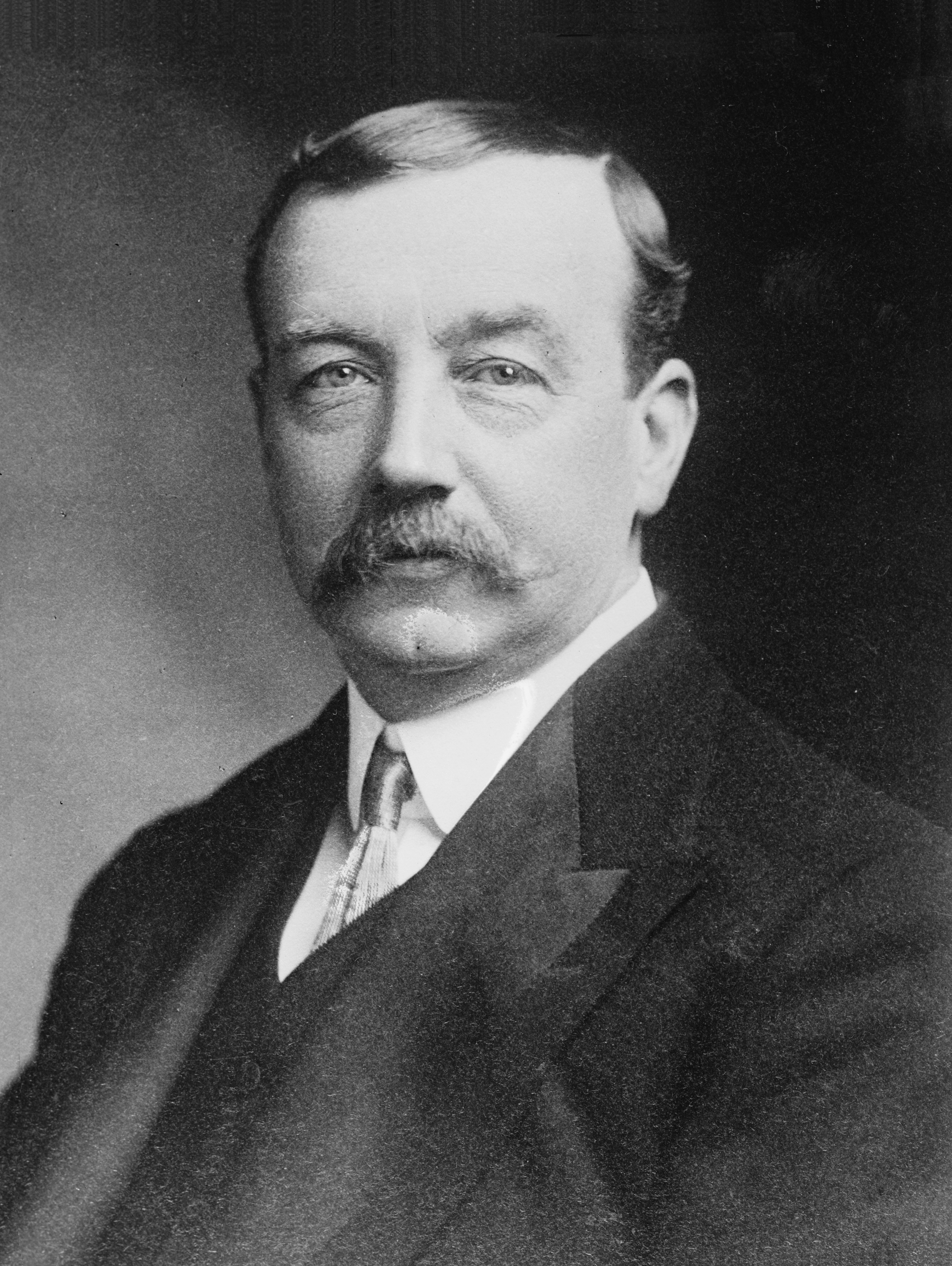
Arthur Henderson, 1910

=== Public service ===
- William Smyth (c. 1460 in Farnworth – 1514) Bishop of Coventry and Lichfield, then Bishop of Lincoln
- Richard Barnes (1532 in Farnworth – 1587) who became Bishop of Carlisle then Bishop of Durham
- Richard Bancroft (1544 in Farnworth – 1610) was Bishop of London and then Archbishop of Canterbury.
- Mary Dennett (1730 in Widnes – 1781) prioress of the Canonesses Regular of the Holy Sepulchre in Liège
- Arthur Henderson (1863–1935) iron moulder and Labour MP; in 1919 he won a by-election in Widnes and in 1934 won the Nobel Peace Prize; he served three separate terms as Leader of the Labour Party (UK).
- Roy Chadwick (1893 in Farnworth – 1947) designed the Avro Lancaster bomber.
- Thomas Mottershead (1892 in Widnes - 1917), joined the Royal Flying Corps during WW1; awarded the Victoria Cross and the Distinguished Conduct Medal posthumously for his gallantry.
- Thomas Wilkinson (1898 in Widnes – 1942) Royal Naval Reserve, awarded the Victoria Cross posthumously during WW2.
- Air Marshal Sir Tap Jones (1914 in Widnes – 2007) Royal Air Force officer for 34 years; commanded a squadron of obsolescent biplane Gladiator fighters during the Battle of Greece
- Jack Ashley (1922 in Widnes – 2012), MP for Stoke-on-Trent South for 26 years
- Gordon Oakes (1931 in Widnes – 2005) MP for Bolton West, for Widnes and for Halton.
- Derek Twigg (born 1959 in Widnes) the Labour MP for Halton and Widnes and Halewood
- John Tiarks (1903–1974) vicar in Widnes in the early 1930s and later became Bishop of Chelmsford.
- David France (born 1948 in Widnes) an author, Everton football historian and philanthropist.

=== The Arts ===
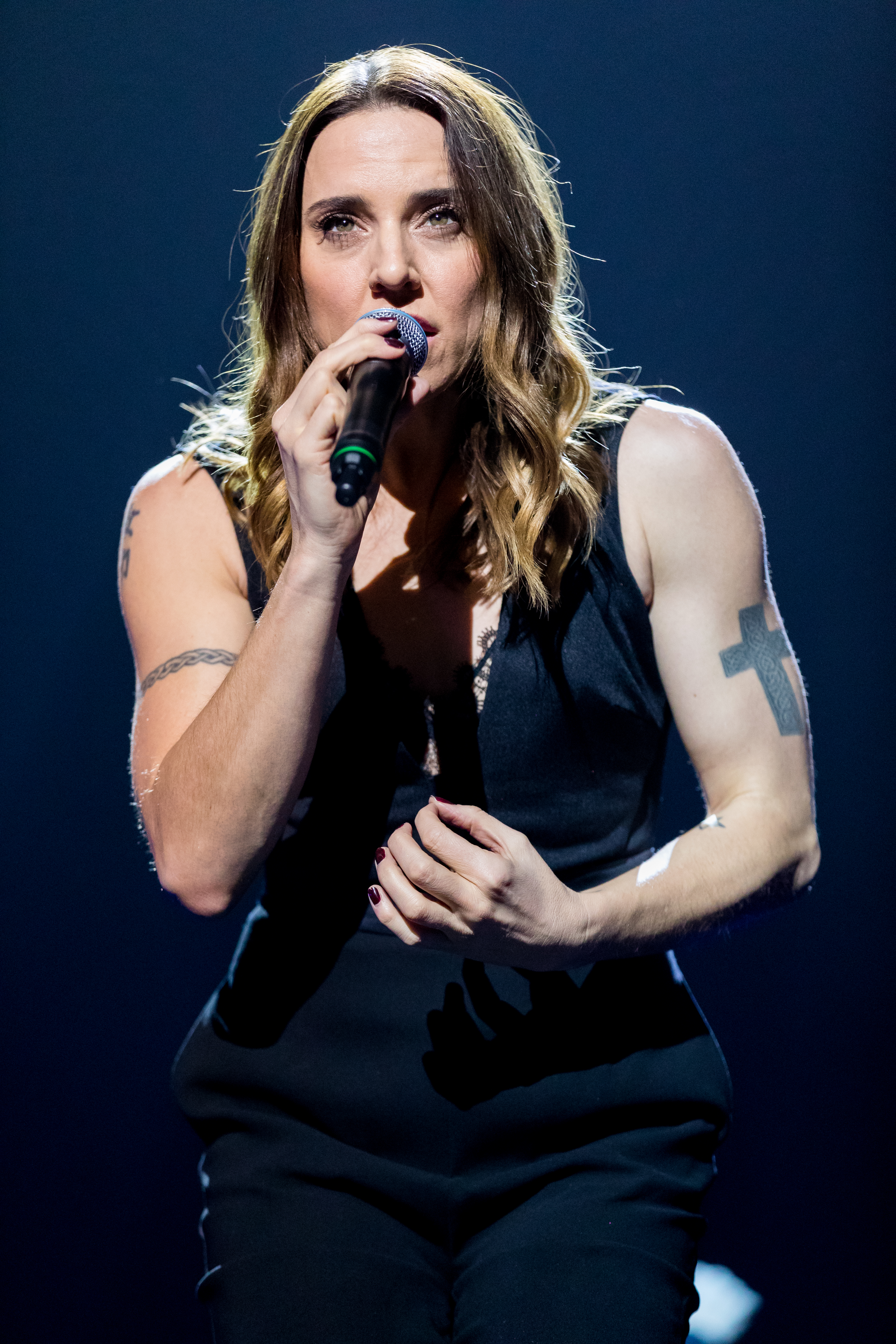
Melanie C, 2017

- Nor Kiddie (born 1897 in Widnes) the stage name of Norman Chilton Kiddie, comedian, actor and juggler
- T. H. Robsjohn-Gibbings (1903 in Widnes – 1976), architect and furniture designer.
- Alan Bleasdale (born 1946) an screenwriter of social realist drama, went to school in Widnes 1957–64
- Michael Kenna (born 1953 in Widnes) photographer best known for his black & white landscapes
- Angela Topping (born 1954 in Widnes) a British poet, literary critic and author
- Ian Finney (born 1966) guitarist, multi-instrumentalist and songwriter, brought up in Widnes
- Jane Weaver (born 1972) singer, songwriter and guitarist, was brought up in Widnes
- Melanie C (born 1974) singer, Spice Girl known as Mel C or Sporty Spice, grew up in Widnes.
- David Dawson (born 1982 in Widnes) film, TV and stage actor

=== Sport ===
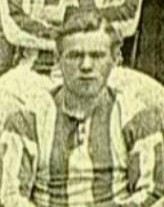
Tommy Magee, 1920

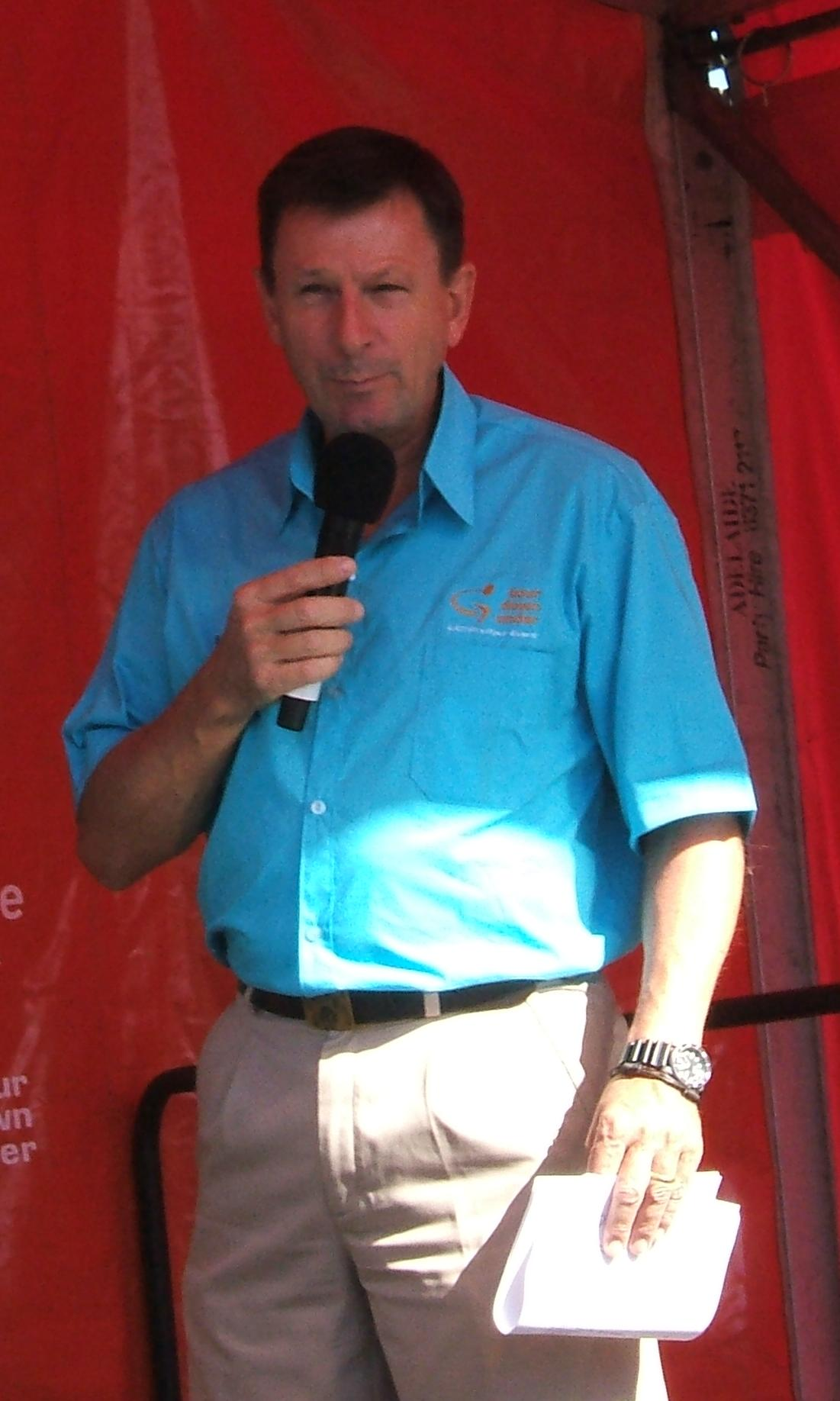
Paul Sherwen, 2009

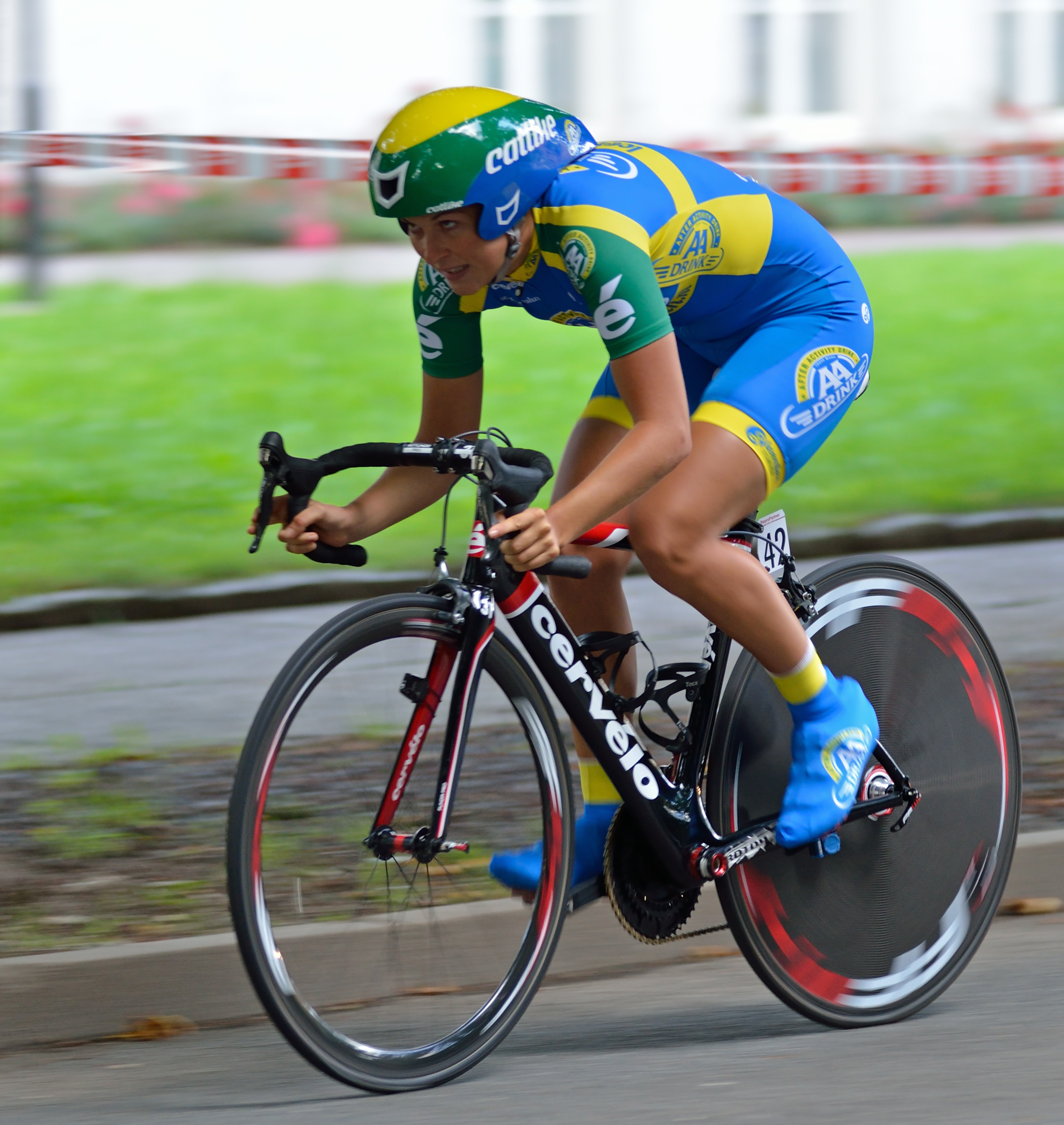
Lucy Martin, 2012

- Johnny Briggs (1862–1902) a distinguished Victorian cricketer, the only man to have scored a hat trick and a century in Ashes cricket, lived in the town 1877-1890s
- Tommy Magee (1899 – 1974 in Widnes) association footballer, played over 400 games for West Bromwich Albion F.C.
- Tommy McCue (1913 in Widnes – 1994) rugby league player, 339 games for Widnes Vikings
- Nat Silcock Jr. (1927 in Widnes – 1992) rugby league footballer, 458 games
- Alan Prescott (1927 in Widnes – 1998) rugby league footballer, 404 matches for St. Helens
- Vince Karalius (1932 in Widnes – 2008) rugby league footballer and coach, played 380 games
- Frank Myler (1938 in Widnes – 2020), rugby league footballer, played 561 games, 367 for Widnes Vikings
- Tony Karalius (1943 in Widnes – 2019) rugby league footballer, 479 games including 355 for St. Helens
- Doug Laughton (born 1944 in Widnes - 2025) rugby league footballer, 450 games
- George Nicholls (born 1944 in Widnes) rugby league player, 484 club games and 40 for GB and England
- John Stephens (born 1945 in Widnes) rugby league footballer, 393 games, including 234 for Wigan Warriors
- Eric Prescott (born 1948 in Widnes – 2023) rugby union and rugby league footballer, played 513 games
- Reg Bowden (born 1949 in Widnes), rugby league footballer, played 504 games mainly for Widnes Vikings
- Keith Elwell (born 1950 in Widnes), rugby league footballer, played 591 games for Widnes Vikings
- Eric Hughes, (born 1950 in Widnes) rugby league footballer, played 481 games for Widnes Vikings
- Mick Adams (1951 in Widnes – 2017) rugby league footballer, 438 games mainly for Widnes Vikings
- Peter Glynn (born 1954 in Widnes – 2024) rugby league footballer, 402 games mainly for St. Helens
- Paul Sherwen (born 1956 in Widnes – 2018) former Tour de France rider
- Mike O'Neill (born 1960 in Widnes) rugby league footballer, 481 games including 388 for Widnes Vikings
- David Hulme (born 1964 in Widnes), rugby league player, played 465 games for Widnes Vikings
- Timothy Bostock (born 1966 in Widnes) former cricketer
- Andy Currier (born 1966 in Widnes) rugby league player 327 games, including 247 for Widnes Vikings
- John Bowles (born 1967 in Widnes) darts player with the Professional Darts Corporation
- Terry O'Connor (born 1971 in Widnes), rugby league footballer, played 398 games, 306 for Wigan Warriors
- Steve Soley (born 1971 in Widnes), association footballer, over 390 games incl. 283 for Carlisle United F.C.
- Andrew Higginson (born 1977) a professional snooker player, lives in Widnes
- Martin Hewitt (born 1980 in Widnes) a mountaineer and former Captain in the Parachute Regiment
- Gary Taylor-Fletcher (born 1981 in Widnes) association footballer, 562 games, 215 for Blackpool F.C.
- Stephen Myler (born 1984 in Widnes), rugby union player and part of the Myler rugby family
- Lucy Martin (born 1990 in Whiston) retired professional road and track cyclist, grew up in Widnes
- Matt Tootle (born 1990 in Widnes), association footballer, over 400 games, 199 for Crewe Alexandra F.C.

== See also ==
- Listed buildings in Widnes

== Further bibliography ==
- The Bridging of Runcorn Gap, Halton: Halton Borough Council, 1978
- Cowan, C. A. (1990), Crossing the Runcorn Gap, Vol. 1: Runcorn Ferry and Hale Ford, Halton: Halton Borough Council
- Cowan, C. A. (1992), Crossing the Runcorn Gap, Vol. 2: Early Bridging Proposals, Halton: Halton Borough Council
- Cowan, C. A. (1990), Crossing the Runcorn Gap, Vol. 3: Runcorn Railway Bridge, Halton: Halton Borough Council
- Morris, Jean M. (2007), Where Spring Never Came, Bury St Edmunds: arima, ISBN 978-1-84549-255-7
