= William Gossage =

British chemist and businessman; established Gossage soap company (1799–1877)

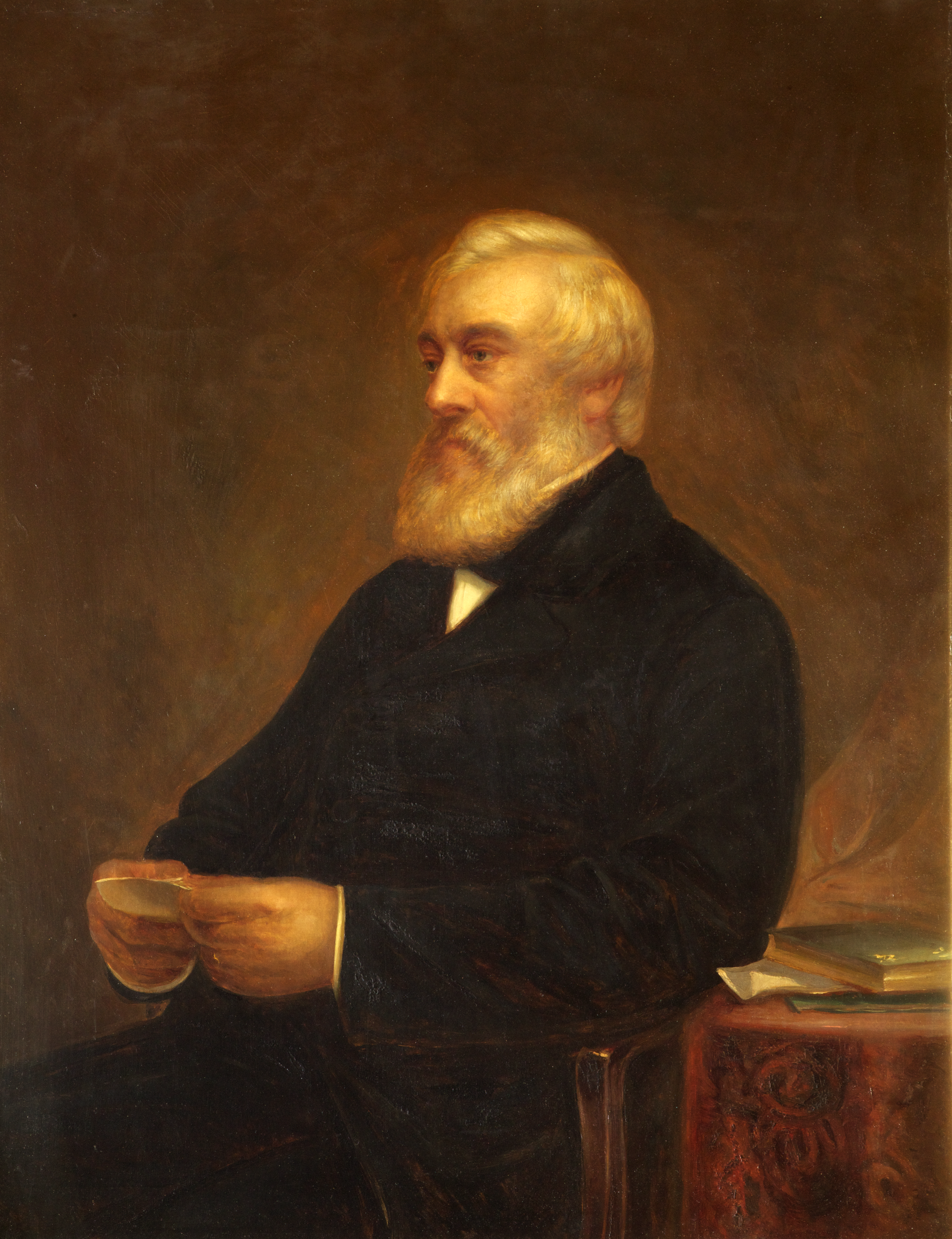
- William Gossage
- Born: 12 May 1799; Burgh-le-Marsh, Lincolnshire, England
- Died: 9 April 1877 (aged 77); Dunham Massey, Cheshire, England
- Known for: Soap, Gossage tower
- Scientific career
- Fields: Chemist and engineer

William Gossage (12 May 1799 – 9 April 1877) was a chemical manufacturer who established a soap making business in Widnes, Lancashire, England.

== Early life ==
William Gossage was born in the village of Burgh-le-Marsh, Lincolnshire to Thomas and Eleanor Gossage, the youngest of 13 children. At the age of 12 he went to work as an apprentice to his uncle, a chemist and druggist in Chesterfield, Derbyshire. During his time there he studied chemistry and French.

== Business career ==
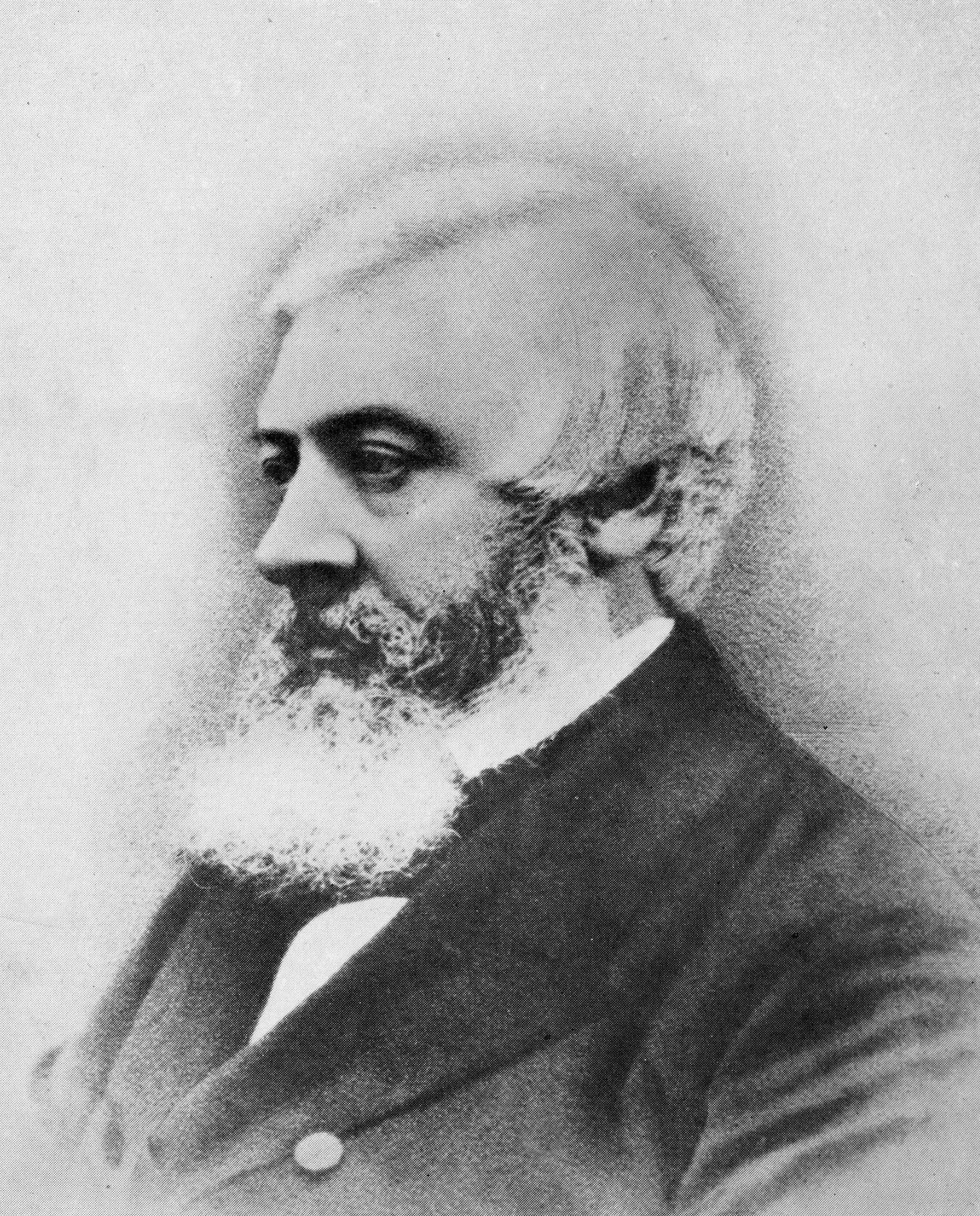
Photograph of William Gossage, date unknown

At the age of 24 he took out his first patent which was a portable alarm to attach to clocks and watches. The purpose of this was to wake his French tutor to begin his lessons early. After working for a time as manager at Ardwick Bridge in a factory owned by the Tennant Company, he set up his own business in Leamington trading in medicinal salts. In about 1830 he went into partnership with a Mr. Farndon making alkali at The British Alkali Works, Stoke Prior, Worcestershire. During this time Gossage experimented with a method of absorbing the hydrochloric acid gas released as a result of the Leblanc process of manufacturing alkali. He filled a derelict windmill with gorse and brushwood, introduced the gas at the bottom, and water at the top, and found that little or no fumes remained at the top. He developed this technique into the Gossage tower, using a deep bed of coke in a high tower to absorb the gas. The Gossage condensing towers were eventually used almost universally by the Leblanc factories.

From 1841 to 1844 Gossage was in Birmingham manufacturing white lead and from 1844 to 1848 he was in Neath, Wales, experimenting with copper smelting. In 1843 and 1845 he took out patents in the field of metallurgy. He returned to Stoke Prior in 1848 and in 1850 he moved to Widnes. Here he established an alkali works on the opposite side of the Sankey Canal from Hutchinson's No 1 factory near to Widnes Dock. Gossage's alkali production was on a small scale and he spent time in various experiments, including extracting sulphur from copper ores, extracting copper from iron pyrites, concentrating sulphuric acid and manufacturing caustic soda from the black ash liquor resulting from the Leblanc process. Following another experiment, consisting of adding sodium silicate to soda ash, he discovered he could produce soap at a much lower cost than by the methods existing at the time and in 1855 he gave up making alkali to set up his soap works. Two years later he started to add pigments to his soap, producing mottled soap, his 'blue mottled' soap being famous both in the UK and abroad. This became extremely successful commercially under the brand name of Gossage. The soap was exhibited at the International Exhibition of 1862 in London where it won a prize medal for "excellence in quality". Gossage continued to experiment throughout the rest of his career and his patents totalled over 50. One of his patents was an attempt to make alkali by the ammonia-soda process and another to recover sulphur from alkali waste.

== Personal and political ==
William Gossage married Mary Herbert of Leamington in 1824 with whom he had seven children. Two of their sons, Alfred and Frederick continued in the family business after Wiliam's death. Gossage's Widnes home was Marsh Hall, near to his works. He was the first chairman of the Widnes Local Board set up in 1865. He was a signatory to an appeal for donations to build an Anglican church at West Bank. He died in 1877 at his home in Dunham Massey, which was then in the county of Cheshire. He is buried in Smithdown Lane cemetery, Liverpool. His estate amounted to under £160,000 (£16126734 in 2016).
