= John Hutchinson (industrialist) =

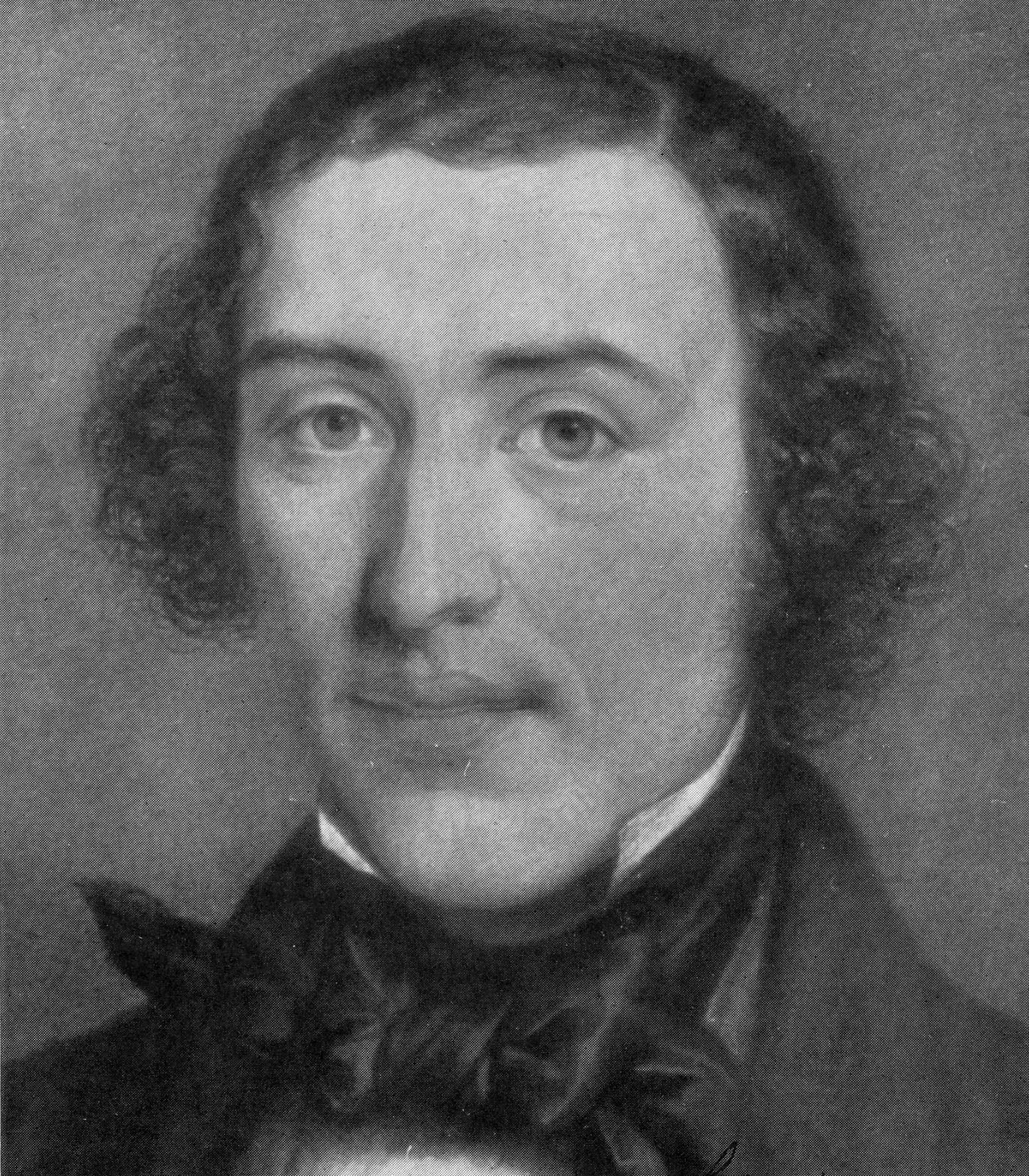
- Hutchinson aged 28
- Born: 1825; Liverpool, England
- Died: 14 March 1865 (aged 40); Widnes (district formally known as Lancashire), England
- Known for: Alkali manufacture
- Scientific career
- Fields: Chemist

Notes
- Opened the first alkali factory in Widnes

John Hutchinson (1825 – 24 March 1865) was a chemist and industrialist who established the first chemical factory in Widnes, then Lancashire, now Cheshire (from April 1998), England. (Note: At that time Widnes was in the historical county of Lancashire; it is now in the ceremonial county of Cheshire.) He initially worked in a chemical factory in St Helens before building his factory in 1847 in the Woodend area of Widnes, near to Widnes Dock. Here he manufactured alkali using the Leblanc process.

He later opened a second alkali factory nearby and developed a number of other business interests. He died at the age of 40 in 1865, by which time a number of other chemical factories had opened in the town.

== Early life ==
The Hutchinson family originally came from Durham but moved to Liverpool, where John was born. His father, John, had held a commission in the Royal Navy and served under Nelson during the Napoleonic Wars. In Liverpool he was a shipbroker and he acted as a Lloyd's agent. Nothing is known of the younger John's early education, but he became a student in Paris. There he met Andrew George Kurtz, the son of Andrew Kurtz who owned an alkali factory in St Helens. Hutchinson was subsequently given a post at this factory.

== Chemical business ==
In 1848, at the age of 22, Hutchinson obtained a lease of land in Widnes, where he established his first factory. Hutchinson's No 1 Works was built between the terminus of the Sankey Canal where it entered the River Mersey, and the terminus of the St Helens and Runcorn Gap Railway, where Widnes Dock, the first railway dock in the world, had been established. This area was to form part of what was later known as Spike Island. By 1851 Hutchinson was employing 100 men. His first works manager was Henry Deacon, but Deacon left to found his own alkali factory nearby in 1853. When Hutchinson arrived in Widnes there was plenty of available labour, partly because of the immigration of Irish unskilled men due to the Great Famine.

In 1859 Hutchinson built his No 2 Works on land he acquired from William Gossage, between Gossage's factory on the other side of the Sankey Canal, and Waterloo Road where he also built the Tower Building to house his office. (Note: The Tower Building now houses the Catalyst Science Discovery Centre.) In 1861 John Brunner came to work at Hutchinson's, joining his older brother Henry, and he was soon appointed office manager. In 1862 the German chemist Ludwig Mond also joined Hutchinson's and a friendship developed between the Brunners and Mond. The association between John Brunner and Ludwig Mond would later develop into the chemical business of Brunner Mond and Company in Northwich.

Around 1853 Hutchinson entered into partnership with Oswald Earle, who had interests in the lime business, and they traded as "Hutchinson and Earle". It is likely that Earle was the selling agent for this business. In addition to his alkali factories, Hutchinson had interests in quarrying, building and farming. He eventually owned more than 350 acres (1.4 km^{2}) of land. He had his own private gasworks near his home in Appleton, from which he supplied to gas to local customers. He developed land to the west of his factories on Widnes Marsh and Moor, where other industrialists built their factories and where another dock, West Bank Dock was built. This area was connected to the Warrington-Widnes-Garston railway by lines owned privately by Hutchinson. He was also the owner of the first privately owned locomotive in the town. By the time of his death in 1865, Hutchinson was employing 600 men.

== Politics and religion ==
Hutchinson was politically a Liberal but he played no part in local government. He had intended to stand as a candidate for Parliament but he died before achieving this. He stated that in religion he was a Protestant but he rarely attended a place of worship. However, he formed good relations with priests from both the Roman Catholic and Anglican churches.

== Personal life ==
In 1850 Hutchinson married Mary Elizabeth Kinsey, who had been born in Ireland but whose family came from Cheshire and Shropshire. They lived throughout their marriage in Appleton Lodge, Widnes, and had five children: three daughters and two sons, including John, Arthur, Mary and Gertrude.

In 1865, at the age of 40, Hutchinson died at his home. The cause of his death was certified as consumption (tuberculosis) and his estate was valued at under £50,000. During his life, the population of Widnes had increased almost fivefold. His contemporaries called him "the father of Widnes".

== References and notes ==
Notes

Citations

Sources

- Hardie, D. W. F. (1950), A History of the Chemical Industry of Widnes, London: Imperial Chemical Industries, OCLC 7503517
- Diggle, Rev. G. E. (1961), A History of Widnes, Corporation of Widnes, OCLC 450270
