= Listed buildings in Widnes =

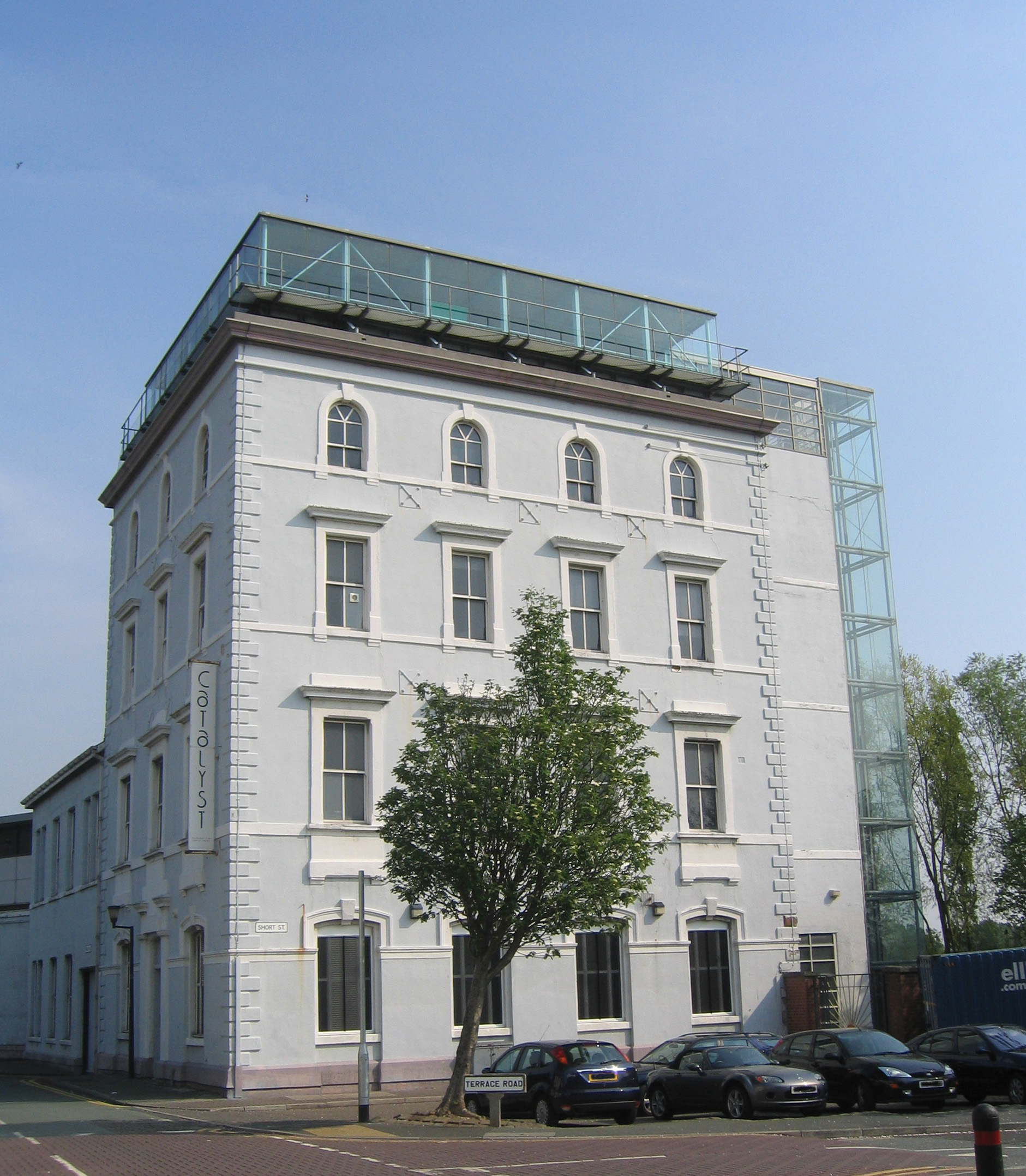
Tower Building, originally the office of Hutchinson & Co, now part of the Catalyst Science Discovery Centre

Widnes is an industrial town in the Borough of Halton, Cheshire, England, on the north bank of the River Mersey where it narrows at Runcorn Gap. The town contains 24 buildings that are recorded in the National Heritage List for England as designated listed buildings. Of these, 5 are classified at Grade II*, and the rest are at Grade II; Widnes has no Grade I listed buildings. In the United Kingdom, the term "listed building" refers to a building or other structure officially designated as being of special architectural, historical, or cultural significance. Listed buildings are categorised in three grades: Grade I consists of buildings of outstanding architectural or historical interest; Grade II* includes particularly significant buildings of more than local interest; Grade II consists of buildings of special architectural or historical interest. Buildings in England are listed by the Secretary of State for Culture, Media and Sport on recommendations provided by English Heritage, which also determines the grading.

Before 1847, the area now occupied by the town of Widnes consisted of the hamlets of Farnworth, Cronton, Appleton, and Upton; a few scattered houses; and areas of mostly marshy farmland. In 1833 a canal and a railway reached the area; the Sankey Canal was extended to a point on the River Mersey to the east of Runcorn Gap and the St Helens and Runcorn Gap Railway established a terminus adjacent to the canal. Widnes Dock, the world's first railway dock, was established at the new terminal, and in 1847 John Hutchinson established the first chemical factory nearby. During the second half of the 19th century, more chemical factories were built and the town grew, absorbing the previously separated hamlets. The town became overcrowded and highly polluted with smoke, chemical fumes, and waste.

The town's listed buildings reflect its history. The oldest, St Luke's Church in the former village of Farnworth, dates from the 12th century. Also built before 1847 are three houses, a bridewell adjacent to St Luke's Church, and the lock at the terminus of the Sankey Canal. The buildings from after 1847—four churches and the cemetery chapels, one public building (the town hall), two railway stations, two bridges crossing the River Mersey, and the former power house of the now-demolished transporter bridge—largely reflect the growing population of the town and its increasing transport links. The Tower Building, formerly an office and now a museum, and a sewer vent, relate to the chemical industry. The latest structures to be listed are a war memorial in Victoria Park and the former Widnes Corporation bus depot. Other than the bridges and the lock, the building materials used are brick, local red sandstone, and terracotta.

== Key ==
Grade	Criteria
II*	Particularly important buildings of more than special interest
II	Buildings of national importance and special interest

Name and location	Photograph	Grade	Date	Description
St Luke's Church, Farnworth 53.3844°N 2.7273°W	A Gothic style sandstone church with a grey slate roof seen from the south; a crenellated tower to the left, a porch in the middle and a large chapel projecting on the right	II*	12th century with later additions	St Luke's is a parish church constructed in red sandstone dating from the late 12th century. Its tower was added in the 14th century. There were later additions and restorations, the final restoration being in 1894–95. The plan consists of a west tower, a five-bay nave with north and south aisles, a chancel, and north and south porches. At the east end of the north aisle is the Bold Chapel, which contains many family monuments, and the transept is known as the Cuerdley Chapel.
Runcorn Railway Bridge 53.3468°N 2.7383°W	A bridge consisting of four girders on sandstone piers crossing the River Mersey seen on a frosty morning; beyond the railway bridge is the arch of the road bridge and under the arches is a church	II*	1864–68	Spanning the River Mersey to provide a more direct rail connection between London and Liverpool, the bridge is constructed of three wrought iron girders carried on four sandstone piers. It is approached on each side by viaducts. The structure was designed by William Baker and now carries the Liverpool branch of the West Coast Main Line.
St Michael's Church, Ditton 53.3625°N 2.7610°W	A tall narrow tower with a small pointed spire surrounded by trees in leaf almost hiding the body of the church; to the left is a footpath with railings and a wall	II*	1876–79	St Michael's is a Catholic church built for a Jesuit community who had been expelled from Germany in 1872. It is constructed in red sandstone ashlar and has a cruciform plan. At the west end is a tall tower with a saddleback roof.
St Mary's Church, West Bank 53.3488°N 2.7329°W	The west end of a Gothic Revival style church built in different coloured sandstone, showing a tall tower with a flagpole; in front is a hedge and to the sides are trees	II*	1908–10	St Mary's parish church was built to replace an earlier church nearby which had been damaged by subsidence. It is constructed in red sandstone in Perpendicular style. It has a nave, aisles, transepts, chancel and a tower at the west end.
Former power house of the Widnes-Runcorn transporter bridge 53.34774°N 2.73595°W	A red sandstone building seen from the rear, in two storeys, with an arch over a footpath on the left in the lower storey, and a plain wall in the upper storey; two chimneys and two hipped roofs; on the left are parts of the bridges and on right is the edge of the approach to the road bridge	II*	1901	This is a small red sandstone rectangular building in three storeys which originally contained the power house to drive the transporter bridge. It has been converted into use as an electrical sub-station.
Norland's House 53.39415°N 2.74312°W	A pathway with a wall on the right leads to a white-painted two-storey house with attic and black-painted dressings; a lower two-storey wing extends to the left and on the right is a lean-to extension	II	Early 18th century	Norland's House is a farmhouse dating from the early 18th century with later alterations and additions. The house is built in brick on a stone plinth. It has two storeys and has been painted white. At the corners are rusticated quoins which have been painted black.
The Hollies 53.38107°N 2.72874°W	A sandstone wall with a hedge and a gate in front of a plain brick house in two storeys with three bays and an arched central doorway; the right side of the house is painted white and the edge of a larger house is to the left	II	Late 18th century	The Hollies is a brick house with two storeys which was built in the 18th century. At the sides of its doorway are Doric fluted columns and over it are a moulded frieze and a fanlight. From 1867 to 1873 it was the home of Ludwig Mond.
103, 105, 107 and 109 Highfield Road 53.3739°N 2.7341°W	A row of two-storey brick cottages with grey slate roofs; the door frames, elaborate window frames and string course are painted white; short gardens are in front and a tree is on the right	II	Early 19th century	This is a terrace of four brick houses with slate roofs which were built in the early 19th century. They have two storeys with a string course between them.
Farnworth bridewell 53.38436°N 2.72699°W	A low plain building in red sandstone with a gently sloping gabled roof and a door to the right with flaking black paint and a notice reading "Bridewell" in Gothic script	II	1827	This was originally a bridewell situated adjacent to St Luke's churchyard. It is a plain rectangular building in red sandstone with a slate roof.
Mersey Lock, Sankey Canal 53.3525°N 2.7317°W	A canal lock with sandstone walls and wooden gates seen from its midpoint; the gates are closed and water is held at a higher level beyond them; railings run along the top of the gates and on the wall to the right	II	1833	The lock is at Spike Island, the terminus of the Sankey Canal where it joins the River Mersey. There is a difference of 12 feet (4 m) between the water level in the canal and the river.
St Bede's Church 53.3711°N 2.7308°W	A Gothic Revival sandstone church seen from the side with a crenellated tower on the left and the body of the church with a clerestory to the right; in the foreground on the right is a path with shrubs and a tree that partly obstruct the view of the church	II	1847	St Bede's is a Catholic church built in red sandstone. The west tower is broad and has angle buttresses and gargoyles. The plan of the church consists of a nave with aisles, and a chancel with a tripartite east end.
Tower Building, now part of Catalyst Science Discovery Centre 53.35184°N 2.73364°W	A four-storey building with four bays painted pale grey, with an extra glass storey on the roof and a glass lift on the right side	II	c. 1860	Tower Building was constructed for the chemical firm of Hutchinson & Co and was later used by Gossage's. In 1989 it was converted into a museum; a glass-surrounded observation deck was built on the roof and a glass external lift was added to the east.
St Marie's Church 53.3624°N 2.7271°W	A plain brick church seen mainly from the end, with a steeply pitched roof, a doorway and buttresses on the left side, and a small bellcote with one bell on the gable end	II	1864	This was a Catholic church which was designed by E. W. Pugin and has been little altered since. It is built in red brick with sandstone dressings. Its plan consists of a nave and apse with lean-to aisles. The church became redundant in 2006 and was listed the same year.
Hough Green railway station 53.37245°N 2.77507°W	Two sets of rails between platforms beyond which is a brick building with two gables and a canopied area between them; a sign to the left says "Hough Green"	II	1872	The station was built in brick for the Cheshire Lines Committee. It has an H-shaped plan with gables at each end and a canopy between.
Widnes railway station 53.37856°N 2.73361°W	Two sets of rails between platforms beyond which is a brick building with two gables and a canopied area between them; a sign to the left says "Widnes"	II	1872	Widnes station was built in brick for the Cheshire Lines Committee. It has an H-shaped plan with gables at each end and a canopy between. It was originally called Farnworth station.
Former town hall 53.36195°N 2.73183°W	A two-storey brick building with extensive terracotta dressings and decoration; a steep grey slate hipped roof with a central attic and chimneys; each lateral bay protrudes slightly forward and is topped by a complex irregular gable end	II	1885	The former Widnes Town Hall is built in brick with terra cotta dressings. It is a symmetrical building in nine bays with an ornate central bay and Dutch gables over the outer bays.
Sewer vent 53.372410°N 2.718569°W	A chimney-like brick structure in two stages with some brick decoration and a corbelled top	II	c. 1893	This chimney-like structure is a sewer ventilation shaft, built in decorated brickwork and approximately 30 feet (9 m) high. It is the last survivor of a system of seven vents whose purpose was to remove the effluent from chemical manufacture.
Cemetery chapels 53.3809°N 2.7358°W	Two joined gabled sandstone chapels with a tower between in Gothic Revival style; the tower is truncated and has the metal skeleton of a spire on its top, the whole acting as a chimney	II	1897	This is a pair of joined gabled chapels that are built in red sandstone. Between the chapels is a tower with an octagonal steeple. Part of the structure has been converted into a crematorium with the steeple used as a chimney.
Wayside pulpit, St Mary's Church 53.348433°N 2.732975°W	A sandstone structure in the shape of an inverted T with an inscription in Gothic script along the top; behind is part of the church to the right and a row of houses to the left	II	c. 1910	This sandstone structure is a pulpit which forms part of the boundary wall of the churchyard of St Mary's Church. It incorporates a religious text which reads, "Go out into the highways and compel them to come in that my house may be filled".
War memorial, Victoria Park 53.37454°N 2.73039°W	A curved area of grass with a floral border beyond which is a cream-coloured obelisk on a large plinth; in the distance are leafless trees and houses	II	1921	Listed in 2007, the memorial is built in York and Portland stone. It comprises an obelisk surmounted by a flaming urn which stands on a plinth on a platform. The sculptor was Herbert Tyson Smith.
Former Widnes Corporation Bus Depot 53.36214°N 2.73695°W		II	1923	The bus depot was built for Widnes Corporation, and is in orange brick with decoration in orange terracotta, and roofs of steel with sheeting in corrugated metal, asbestos and plastic. It consists of a long rectangular building with a full-height covered garage to the rear, and a lower office and a workshop range. On the front are three vehicle entrances, each under a triangular pediment containing a triangular panel, two with finials. Between them are two-storey office buildings containing windows with terracotta surrounds. At the rear of the yards is a workshop range.
Kingsway Health Centre 53.3633°N 2.7330°W		II	1938–39	This a rare example of a 1930s comprehensive health centre outside London. It is designed in Moderne style and incorporates Art Deco elements. It was listed in 2009, and the associated walls, gates and railings are included in the listing.
Silver Jubilee Bridge 53.3463°N 2.7379°W	In the foreground is the Manchester Ship Canal with a portion of shore and its wall beyond; behind this is a grey-coloured arch carrying a roadway with the piers of the railway bridge beneath; under the arch are factories on the far side of the river	II	1956–61	This road bridge crosses the River Mersey and links Runcorn with Widnes, replacing the former Widnes–Runcorn Transporter Bridge. It is a through arch bridge which carries a four-lane carriageway and a cantilevered footway to the east. Its span is 1,082 feet (330 m) and its total length is 1,628 feet (496 m).
Former Church of St Pius X and attached campanile 53.3811°N 2.7319°W		II	1960	The former Roman Catholic church and the campanile are built in yellow brick with dressings in stone and concrete, and the church has a tile roof. The church has a rectangular plan and consists of a nave and a chancel, with the campanile attached to the southwest. Along the sides of the church are tall pointed windows in bays divided by buttresses. The campanile is 21 metres (69 ft) tall, it has a square plan, and contains tall, narrow bell openings.
