= Widnes Town Hall =

Municipal building in Widnes, Cheshire, England

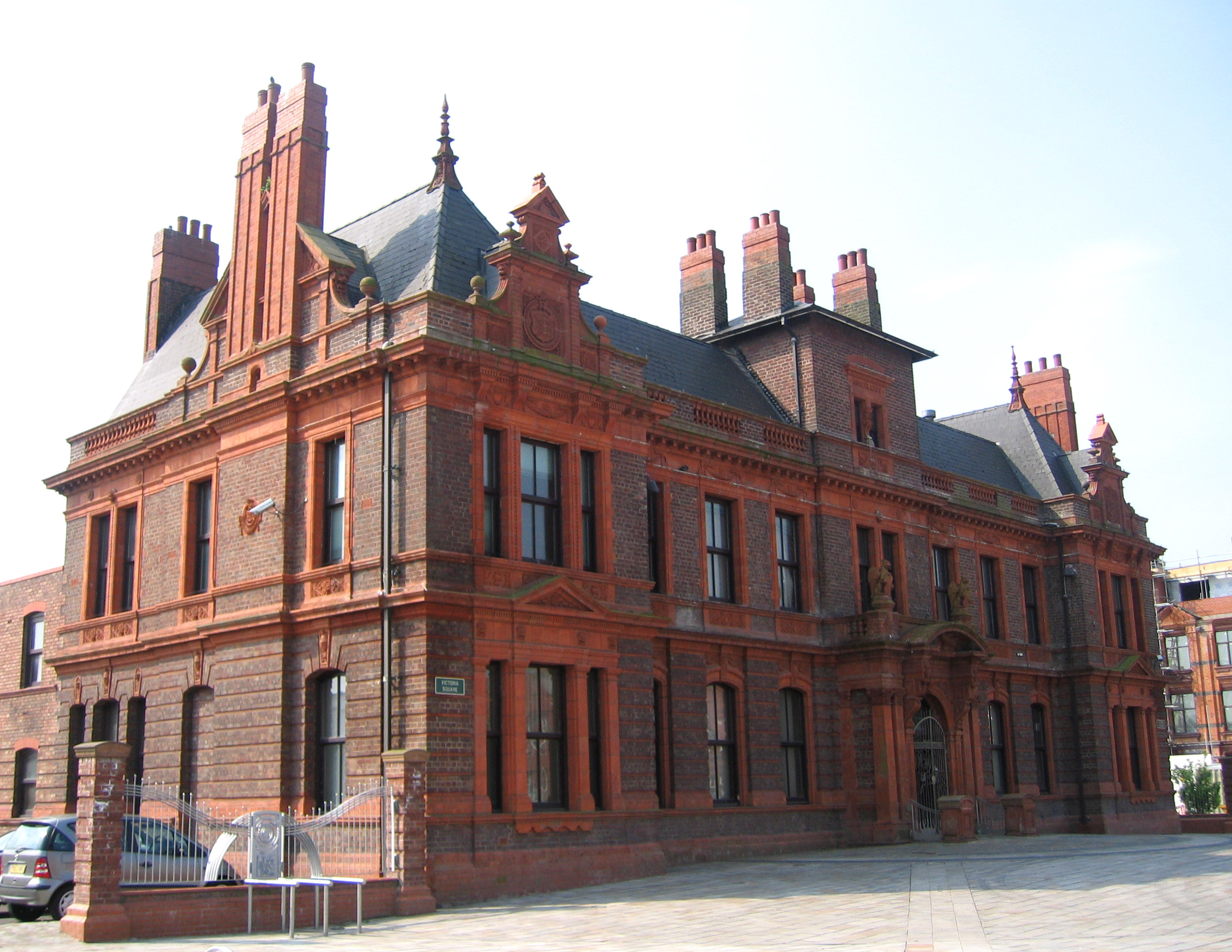
- Widnes Town Hall

- Shown in Cheshire
- 53.3619°N 2.7318°W
- Location: Widnes

History
- Built: 1885

Site notes
- Architect(s): F. and G. Holme
- Architectural style: Renaissance style

Listed Building – Grade II
- Official name: Widnes Town Hall
- Designated: 31 October 1983
- Reference no.: 1330355

Widnes Town Hall is a municipal building in Victoria Road in Widnes, Cheshire, England. The town hall, which was the headquarters of Widnes Borough Council, is a Grade II listed building.

== History ==
After significant industrial growth in the second half of the 19th century, particularly in relation to the chemical industry, members of the local board of health decided to procure a town hall: the site they selected had been open land in what was then little more than a village established close to the Gossage chemical works.

The new building, which was designed by F. and G. Holme in the Renaissance style and built with terracotta dressings, was completed in 1885. After the building became the headquarters of the new municipal borough of Widnes in 1892, King George V visited the building and met with civic leaders on 7 July 1913. The building ceased to be the seat of local government in 1967, when the council moved to the new Municipal Building on Kingsway.

In 1982 the building became the home of the Halton Chemical Industry Museum, a temporary exhibition funded by the Manpower Services Commission to celebrate the centenary of the Society of Chemical Industry. As well as chemical industry exhibits, there were also displays dealing with other aspects of local history. The success of the exhibition led to the formation of the Museum of the Chemical Industry (subsequently renamed the Catalyst Science Discovery Centre) at Gossage House in Widnes in 1989. The town hall then became the home of the Halton Business Forum, a provider of support to local businesses. The forum also relocated, in around 2004, to the new Forum Building at Widnes Waterfront, which had been established as the Borough's economic development zone.

The town hall was then left empty and deteriorating, until a developer, Stephen Lawler, acquired the building, and carried out some limited restoration works. Although the rear of the ground floor and the whole of the first floor were left undeveloped and unoccupied, the front part of the ground floor re-opened as a bar and night club known as "The Establishment".

== Description ==
The building is in the Renaissance style, with terracotta dressings. The design involves a symmetrical main frontage with nine bays facing onto Victoria Square with the end bays slightly projecting forward; the central bay, which also slightly projects forward, features a doorway with brackets supporting an open pediment containing a carved tympanum. The doorway is flanked by twin pilasters supporting griffins bearing shields; there is a central sash window on the first floor and a smaller sash window on the attic floor, above which there is an inscription "MDCCCLXXXV" (1885).

== See also ==
- Listed buildings in Widnes
