= St Bede's Church, Widnes =

Coordinates: 53.3711°N 2.7308°W

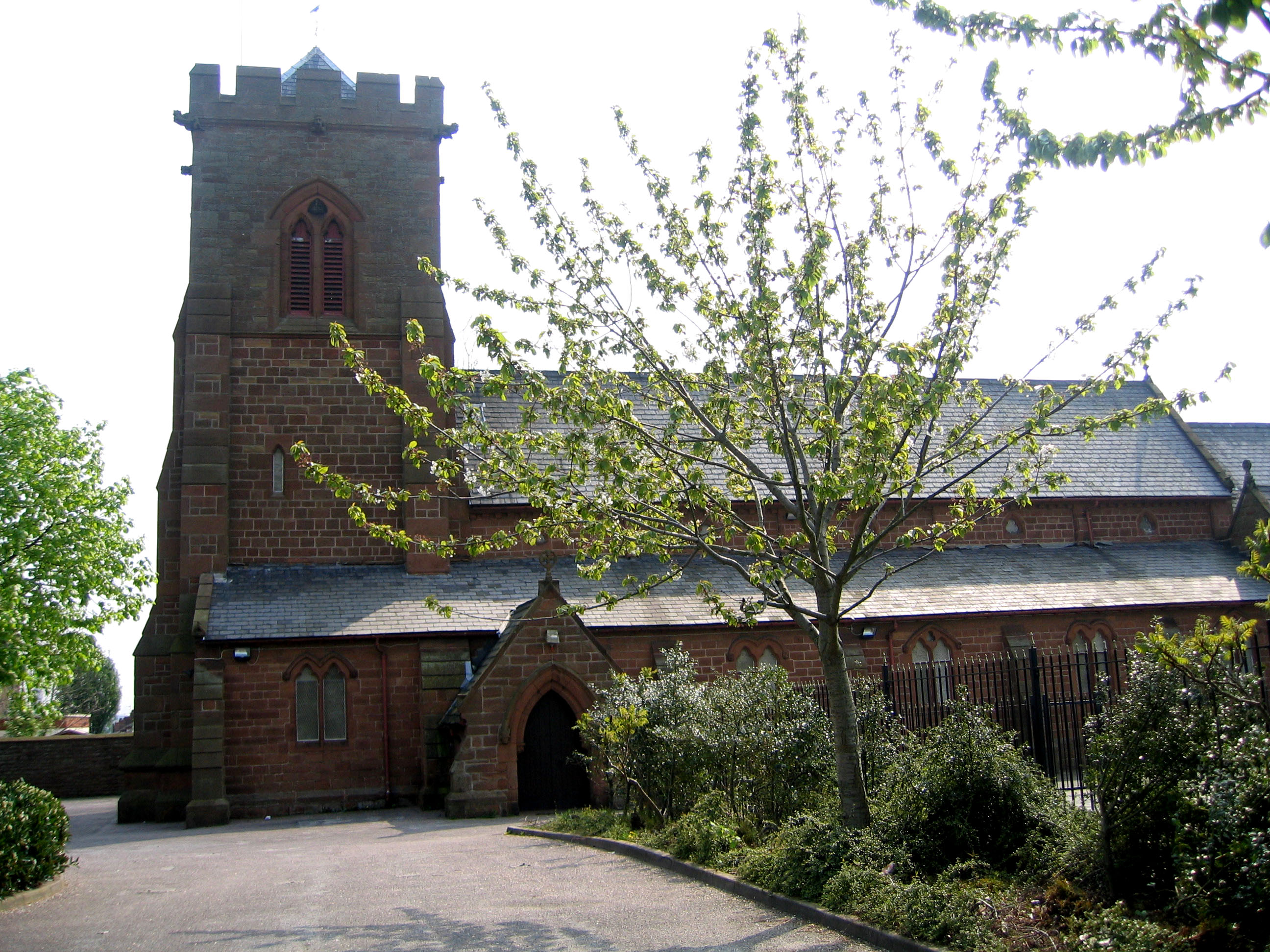
- St Bede's Church, Widnes, from the south

- Location in Cheshire
- OS grid reference: SJ 514 863
- Location: Widnes, Cheshire
- Country: England
- Denomination: Roman Catholic

History
- Status: Parish church
- Dedication: Saint Bede

Architecture
- Functional status: Active
- Heritage designation: Grade II
- Designated: 31 October 1983
- Architect(s): Weightman and Hadfield
- Architectural type: Church
- Style: Gothic Revival
- Completed: 1847

Specifications
- Materials: Red sandstone, slate roof

Administration
- Diocese: Liverpool
- Parish: St Wilfrid, Widnes

St Bede's Church is in Appleton Village, Widnes, Cheshire, England. It is an active Roman Catholic parish church in the Archdiocese of Liverpool. The church is recorded in the National Heritage List for England as a designated Grade II listed building.

== History ==
The church was completed in 1847 and had been designed by Weightman and Hadfield. The land was donated by members of the local Dennett family, who also paid towards the cost of the building, which came to £3,000 (equivalent to £270,000 in 2025). The church was consecrated on 22 September 1847. In May 1856 the original church bell was consecrated by Revd Alexander Goss, bishop of Liverpool. This was replaced in 1879 by the present bell, which was blessed by the then bishop of Liverpool, Revd Bernard O'Reilly. In 1922 the church was renovated, and the roof was replaced. The church is currently undergoing considerable restoration (2024)

== Architecture ==
St Bede's is built in red sandstone with a slate roof. Its plan consists of a north tower, a nave with a clerestory, east and west aisles, a chancel and a north porch. The tower has angle buttresses and gargoyles, and is crenellated. The windows in the nave are paired lancets, those in the clerestory have trefoil heads, and the tracery in the chancel windows is curvilinear. The entrance to the church is in the tower, and is in Decorated style.

Inside the church the arcades are carried on alternate round and octagonal columns. The altar dated 1850 is said to be by A. W. N. Pugin. The large organ is sited under the tower. There is stained glass in the south window, and on the east and west sides of the chancel.

== Organ ==
The original pipe organ was installed by Gray and Davison in 1848 at a cost of £200. It was overhauled and electrified in the 1930s. This organ was replaced in 1979 by a two-manual organ made by George Benson in 1904 for the Independent Methodist Church in Oldham. It had been cleaned by Wadsworth in 1937 and was moved here, renovated and installed by J. A. Cundle and Sons of Liverpool at a cost of £3,850. The organ was renovated in the 2000s by Sydney Reeves, aided by a grant from the Heritage Lottery Fund.

== See also ==
- Listed buildings in Widnes
