= St Marie's Church, Widnes =

Coordinates: 53.3624°N 2.7271°W

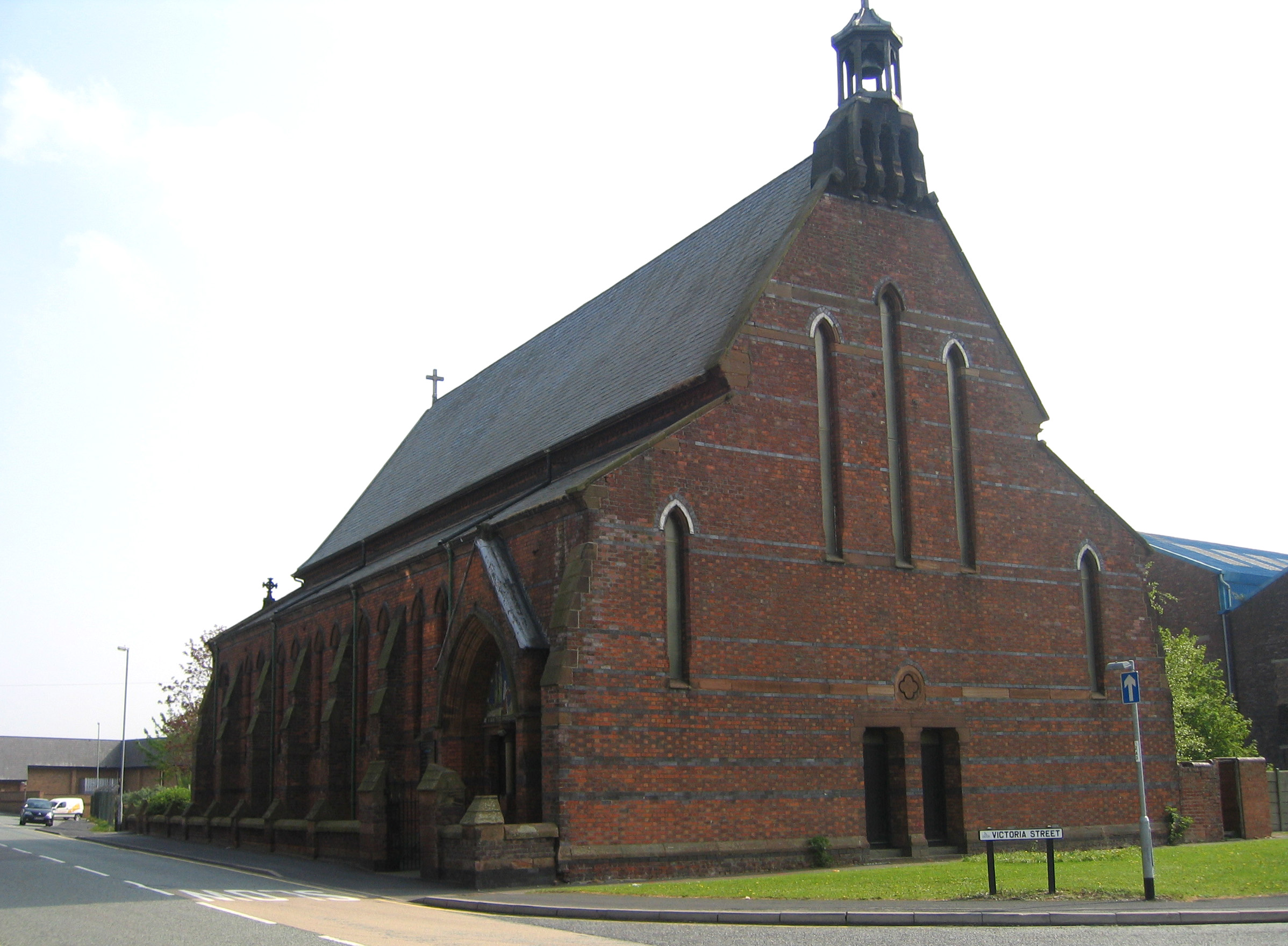
- St Marie's Church, Widnes
- St Marie's Church, Widnes
- OS grid reference: SJ 513 851
- Location: Widnes, Halton, Cheshire
- Country: England
- Denomination: Roman Catholic

Architecture
- Functional status: Redundant
- Heritage designation: Grade II
- Designated: December 2006
- Architect: E. W. Pugin
- Architectural type: Church
- Style: Gothic Revival
- Groundbreaking: 1862
- Completed: 1865

St Marie's Church is a redundant Roman Catholic church in Lugsdale Road, Widnes, Cheshire, England. It is recorded in the National Heritage List for England as a designated Grade II listed building.

== History ==
The church was built between 1862 and 1865 to accommodate the large numbers of Irish immigrants who had come to work in the local chemical factories. It was opened in 1865, and designed by E. W. Pugin. The church was listed at Grade II on 22 December 2006, but closed for worship early the following year. The church has been placed on the Buildings at Risk list by the campaign group Save Britain's Heritage, and has been identified by the Victorian Society as being one of the ten most endangered Victorian buildings in Britain. In 2012 a grant from the Heritage Lottery Fund was obtained to enable the church to be converted into premises for Halton and St Helens Voluntary action.

== Architecture ==
=== Exterior ===
St Marie's is constructed in red brick with sandstone dressings, and has blue brick banding. It is roofed with Welsh slate. The plan consists of a single cell. The nave has a polygonal apse at the east end, and there are seven-bay aisles under lean-to roofs at the sides. On the gable at the west end is a bellcote with a cross finial. At the west end are three stepped lancet windows over a double doorway. The bays of the aisles are separated by stepped buttresses, and each bay contains a pair of lancet windows. On the north side of the church is an arched doorway under a gable, the tympanum of the arch containing a mosaic with the inscription "I am the Immaculate Conception". At the east end of the church the aisles terminate in gables, each gable containing a circular opening and surmounted by a cross finial. Each facet of the apse contains a pair of lancet windows.

=== Interior ===
The arcades between the nave and the aisles are carried on slender piers. At the west end of the church is a gallery carrying the organ. At the east end of both aisles is an altar. The ceiling of the apse has painted and stencilled decoration. The richly decorated alabaster reredos contains paintings with gold backgrounds depicting the Nativity, the Annunciation, and the Assumption. These have been attributed to J. A. Pippet of Hardman & Co. In front of the reredos is a richly-carved altar and benediction throne under an elaborate canopy. The two-manual pipe organ was made in about 1880 by Wadsworth of Manchester.

== See also ==
- Listed buildings in Widnes
