= Municipal Borough of Widnes =

Former local government area in the UK

Coordinates: 53.363°N 2.728°W

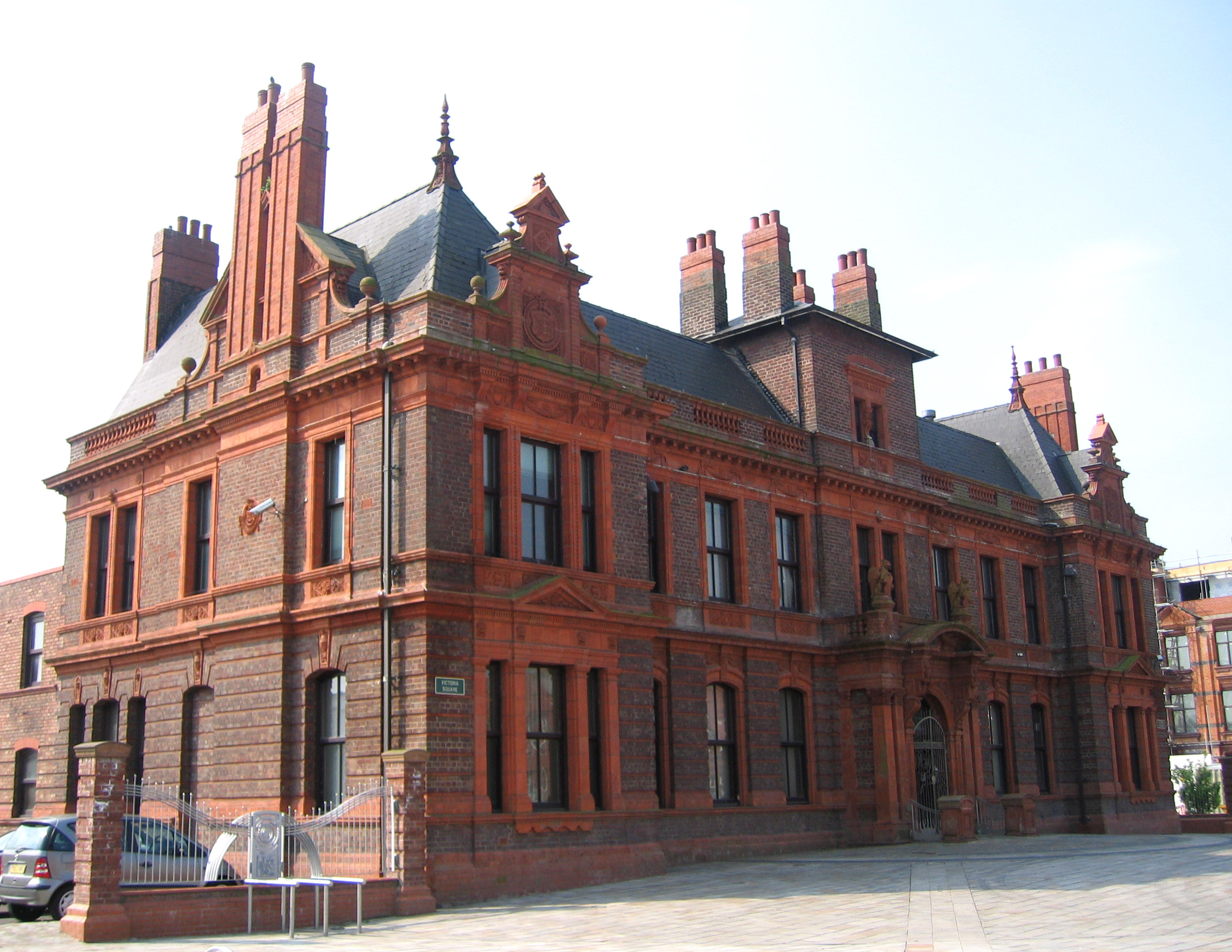
- Widnes Town Hall
- Area
  - 1911: 3,093 acres (12.5 km^{2})
  - 1961: 5,746 acres (23.3 km^{2})
- Population
  - 1901: 28,580
  - 1971: 56,953
- History
  - Created: 1892
  - Abolished: 1974
  - Succeeded by: Borough of Halton
- Status: Local board (1865–1892); Municipal borough (1892–1974)
- Government
  - HQ: Widnes Town Hall
  - Motto: Latin: Industria Ditat, lit. 'Industry Enriches'

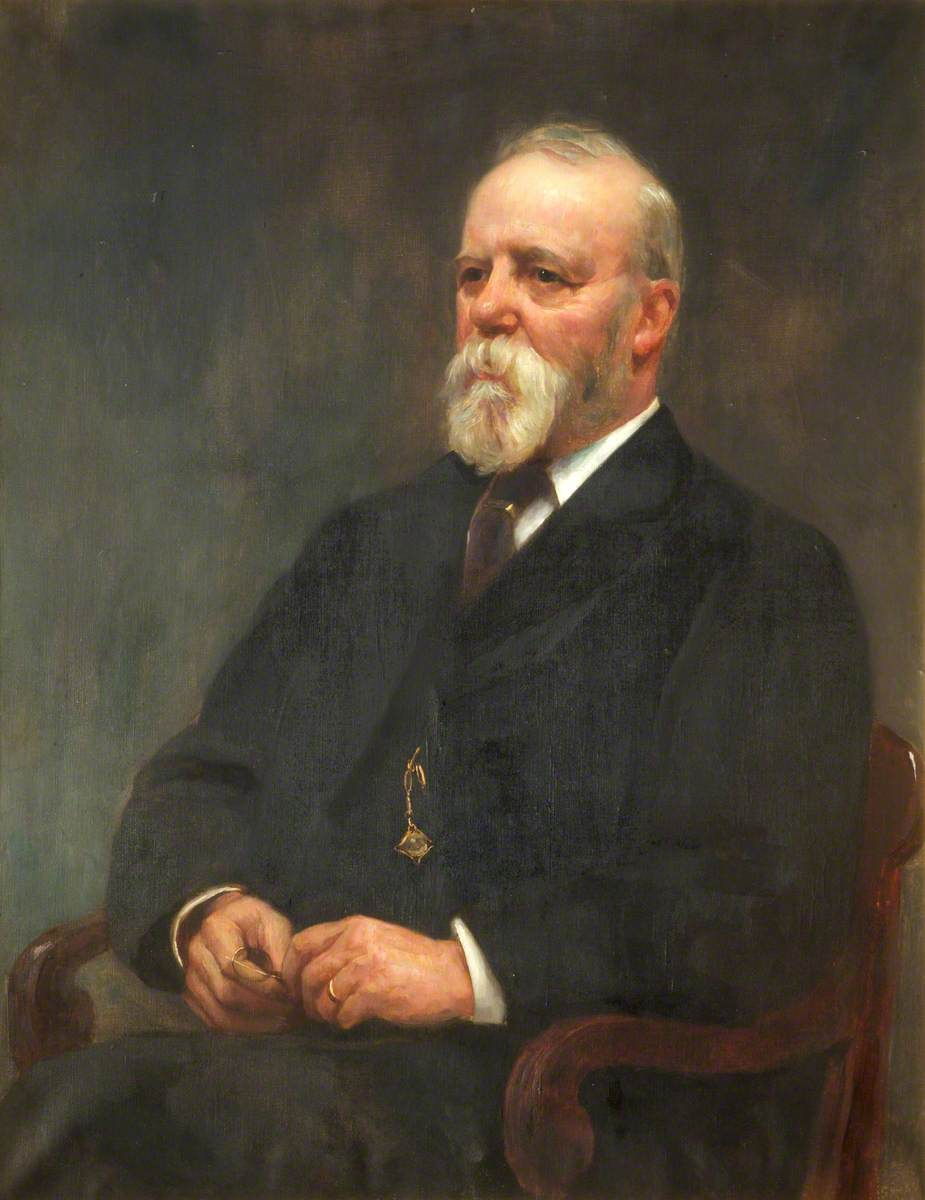
Frederick Herbert Gossage (1831–1907), Mayor of Widnes (1892–1893)

The Municipal Borough of Widnes was a municipal borough centred around the town of Widnes in Lancashire, England from 1892 until 1974.

The district was abolished in 1974 under the Local Government Act 1972 when it merged with Runcorn Urban District and parts of Runcorn Rural District and Whiston Rural District to form the Borough of Halton in Cheshire.
