= Catalyst Science Discovery Centre =

Museum in Widnes, Cheshire, England

Catalyst Science Discovery Centre and Museum
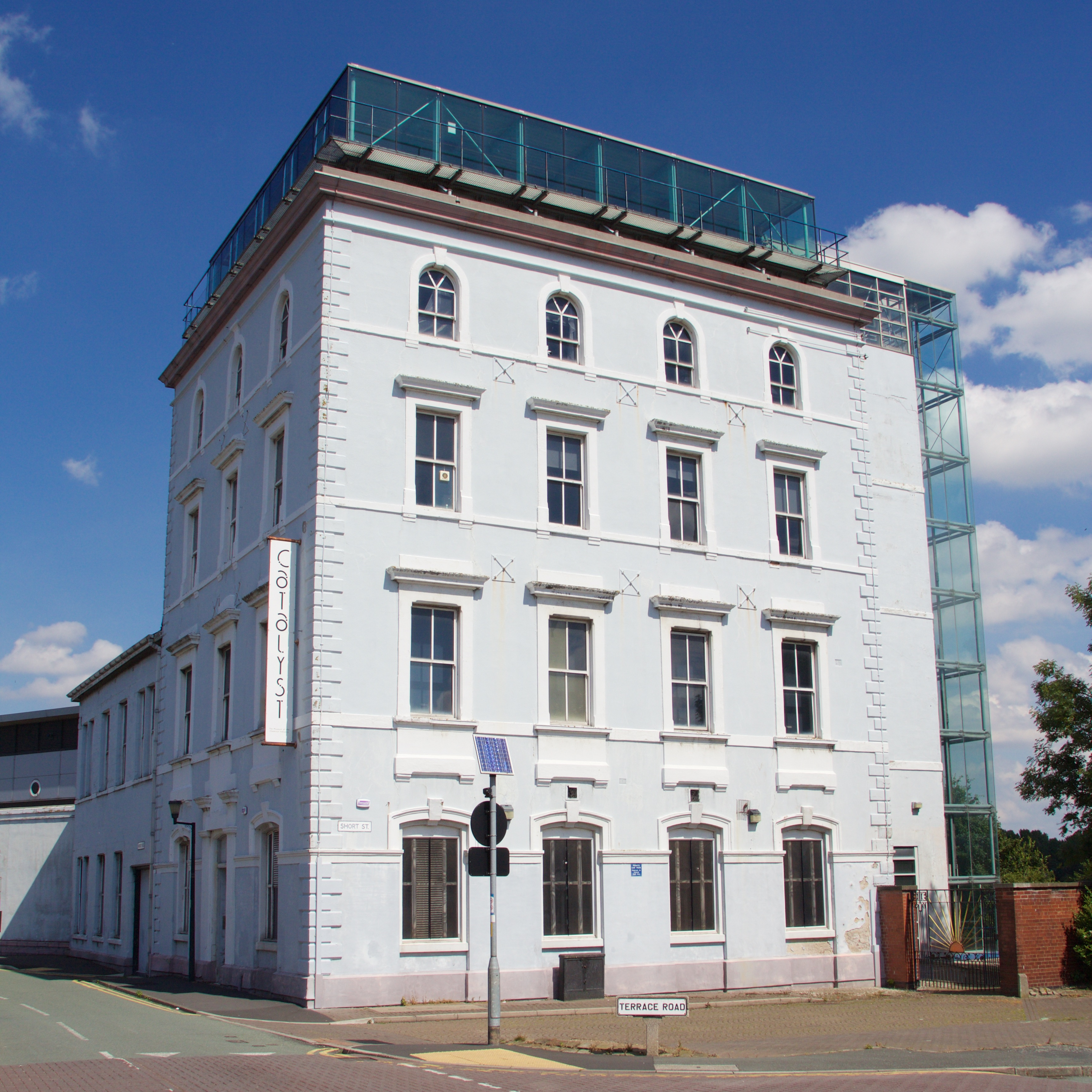
- Catalyst Science Discovery Centre and Museum.
- Former name: Museum of the Chemical Industry
- Established: 1987
- Location: Widnes, Halton, England
- Coordinates: 53.35184°N 2.73364°W
- Type: Science museum
- Accreditation: Arts Council England
- Visitors: 30,000
- Website: catalyst.org.uk

The Catalyst Science Discovery Centre and Museum is a science and technology museum in Widnes, Halton, North-West England. The centre has interactive exhibits, reconstructed historical scenes, an observatory, a live-science theatre and family workshops. It is next to Spike Island, a public park, located between the River Mersey and the Sankey Canal that has woodlands, wetlands, footpaths and industrial archaeological history.

The centre is housed in Tower Building, constructed around 1860 by John Hutchinson as the administrative centre for his chemical business. The centre holds a collection of archives relating to the chemical industry, these include documents, photographs and the entire research archive of the ICI General Chemical Division.

== History ==
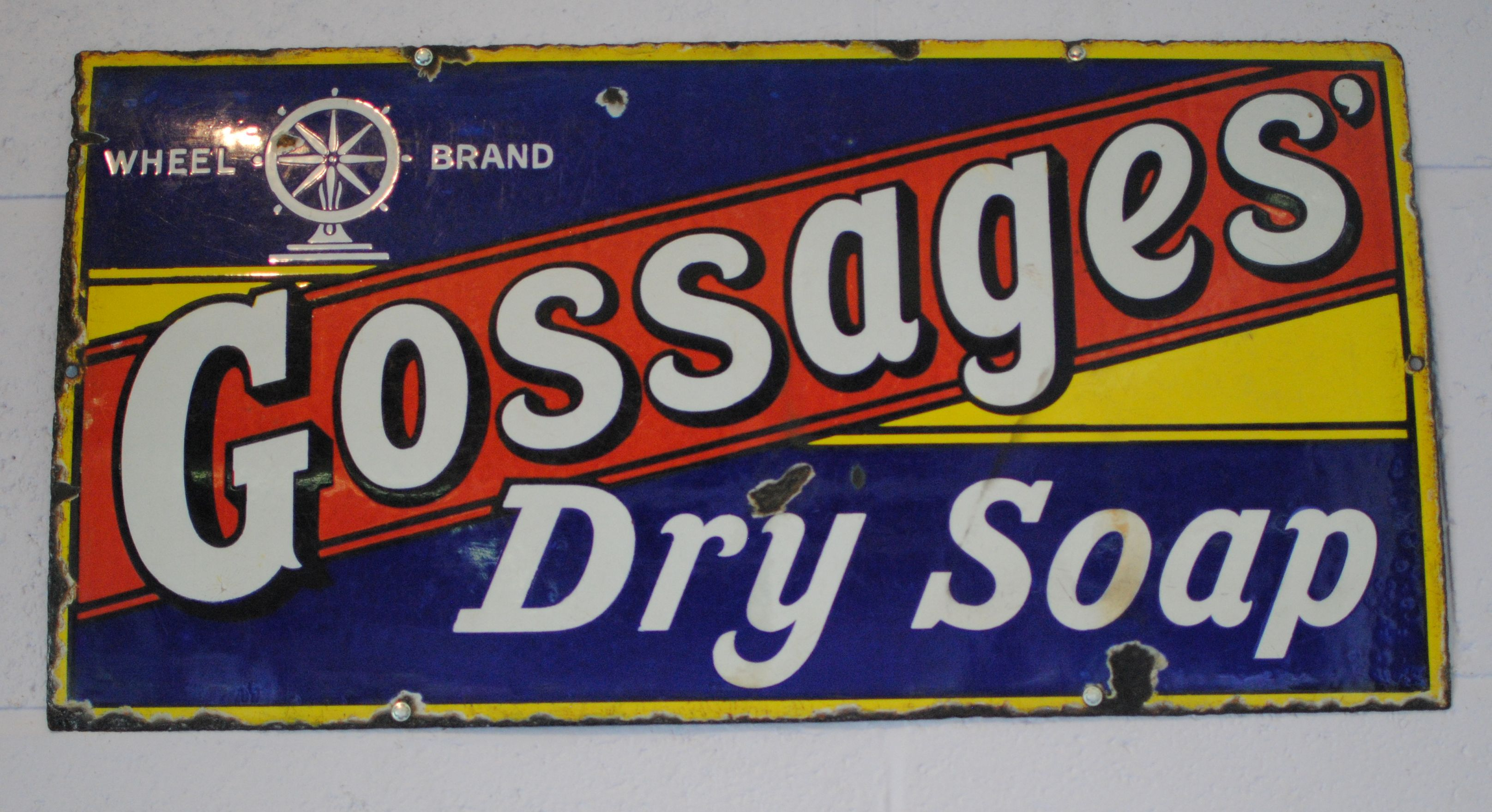
The Catalyst building was formerly the head offices of the Gossage soap company

Catalyst is next to Spike Island, in Widnes, Halton. The museum is housed in an old four-storey building with modern extensions. The building was originally known as the Tower Building and was constructed around 1860 by John Hutchinson as the administrative centre for his alkali business. It later became the head office of the Gossage soap company, which at one time was the largest of its kind in the world and handled half of the UK's soap exports. The town of Widnes was once the centre of the North West chemical manufacturing industry and has been heavily influenced by it for the last 170 years.

The museum originated as a temporary exhibition to celebrate the centenary of the Society of Chemical Industry in 1982. Halton Borough Council, in collaboration with a number of chemical companies, decided to make the exhibition permanent. In 1982, they conducted a study to find out whether sufficient material and an appropriate location were available to set up a museum devoted to the chemical industry, and a temporary display area was set up in the old Widnes Town Hall. It was a traditional exhibit-based display that dealt in equal parts with the local chemical industry and other local history.

The museum opened in 1987 and was called "The Museum of the Chemical Industry". It claimed to be the world's first museum dedicated to the chemical industry. A glass lift and an enclosed glazed roof-top observation deck, designed by Austin-Smith:Lord, were added to the building in 1989. In 1991, Gordon Rintoul introduced a new gallery with interactive exhibits and activities. In 1994–95, an extension was added to the north to provide an education centre and visitor services. Rintoul remarked that one of the main purposes of the museum was to forge closer links between industry and the public.

== Facilities ==
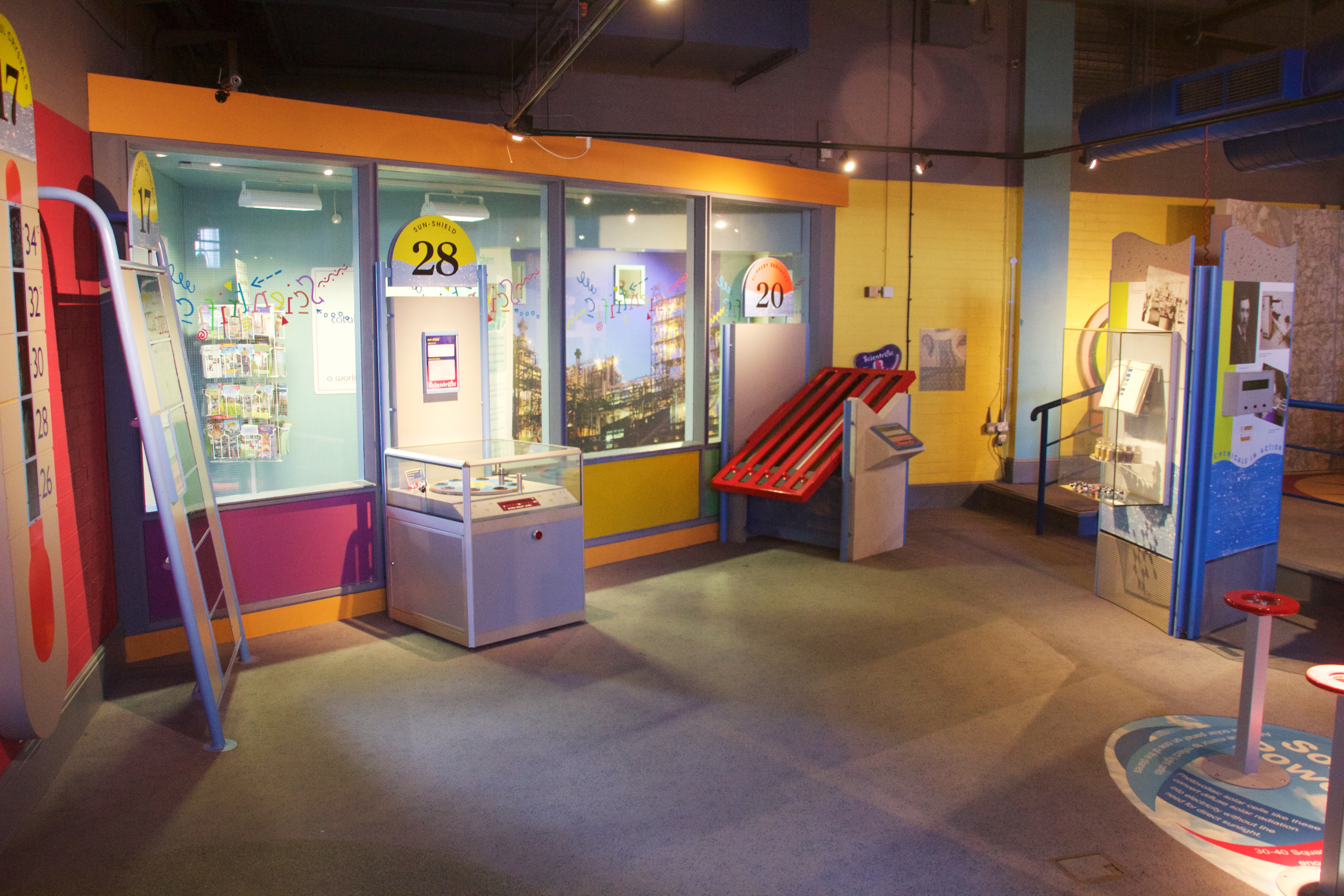
Interactive exhibits at the museum

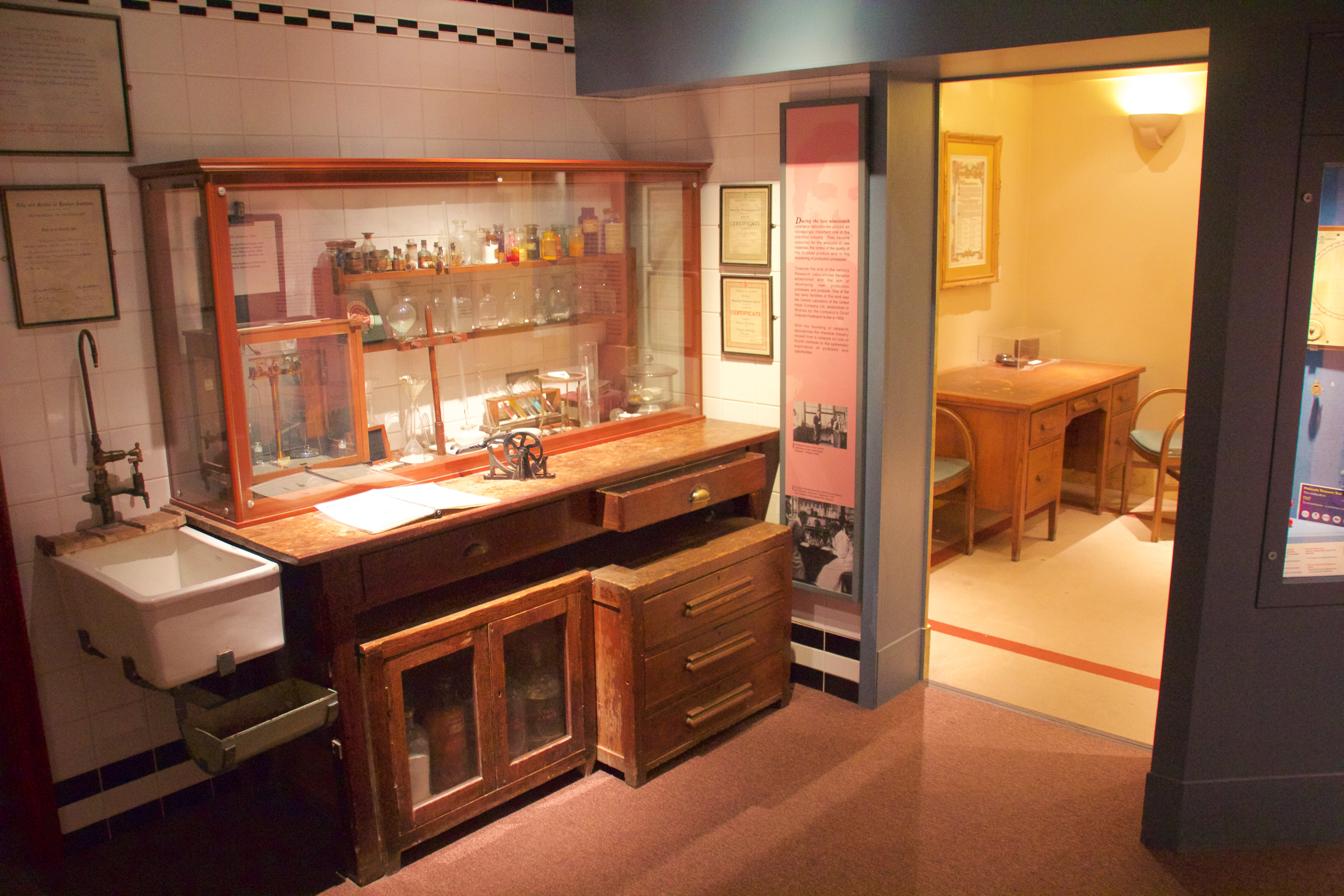
A reconstructed chemical laboratory from the 19th century

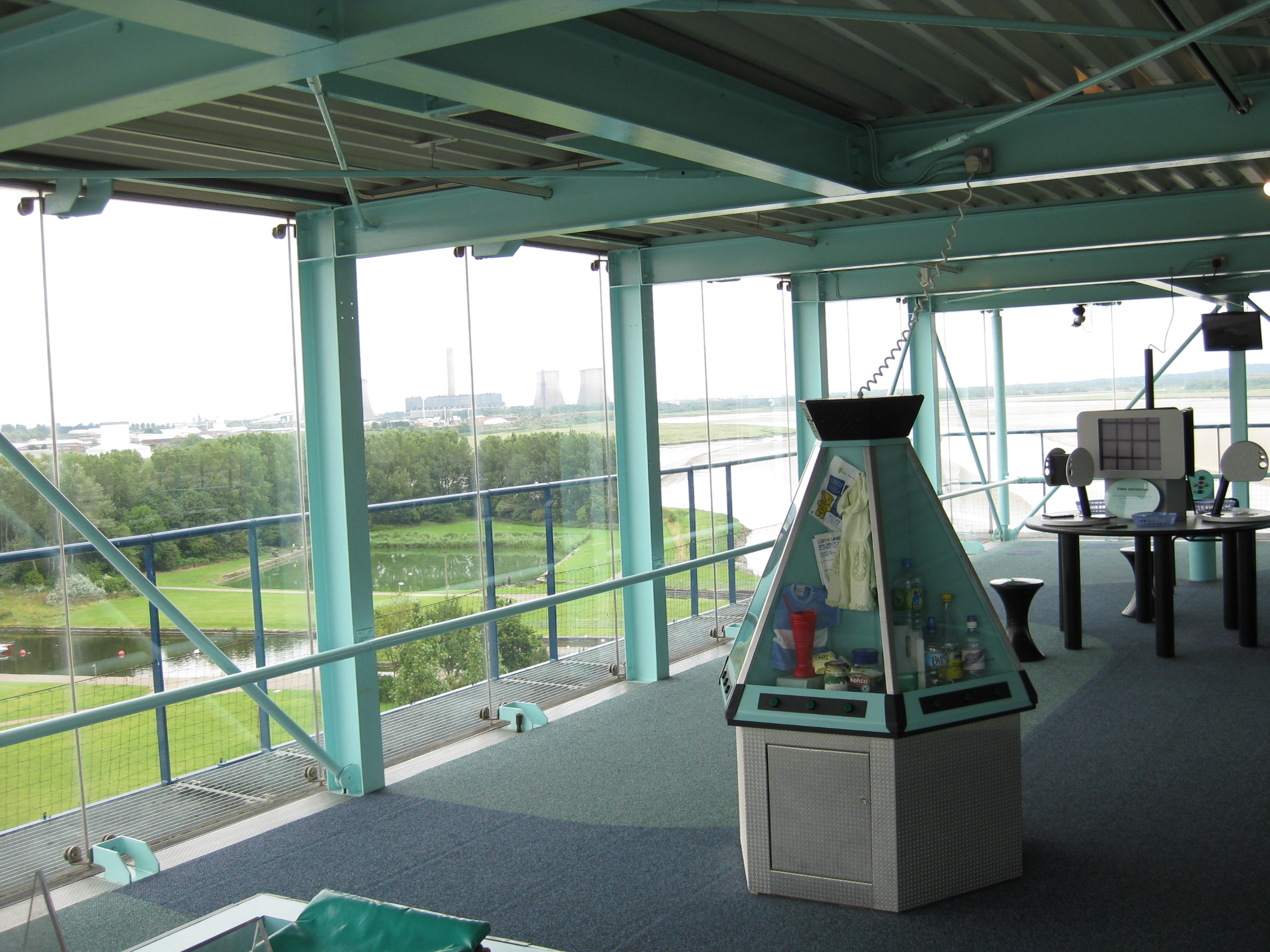
View from the observatory on the top floor of the museum

Catalyst is an interactive science and technology museum. There are over 80 interactive exhibits, plus multi-media programs and re-constructed historical scenes bringing science, technology and engineering to life. In addition to static exhibitions and hands-on experiments, it contains a theatre which gives live science and technology presentations. There is an observatory on the top floor of the museum offering panoramic views of the River Mersey, Spike Island and the Mersey Gateway Bridge. Family workshops are arranged during school and bank holidays and there is a cafe.

The exhibits range from test tubes to a 20-ton cast iron caustic soda finishing vessel, laboratory equipment, and chemical samples. The industrial focus of the collection is the salt-based chemical industries of Merseyside, South Lancashire, North Cheshire and Mid Cheshire, other chemical industries in these areas are also covered. Catalyst has collected local social history objects which has helped to give a human context to the collection. The social history collection has been confined to Widnes, Runcorn and its environs.

The centre is next to Spike Island, a park, with footpaths, cycle paths, the Sankey Canal, woodland, wetlands, views of the River Mersey, views of the Mersey Gateway Bridge, birdlife, fishing, industrial heritage, Widnes Dock, picnic tables, a multi-purpose sports pitch, a children's play area and the Trans Pennine Trail. Mersey riverboats are moored in the Sankey Canal. The canal, although in water, is not navigable past the island. The park is maintained by Halton Borough Council.

The museum attracts 30,000 visitors per annum. About 25% of the current annual total is accounted for by school classes for which Catalyst provides an education program that links directly to the National Curriculum. Catalyst holds the accreditation of 'Quality Assured Visitor Attraction' and to date, has won a number of major awards, including the prestigious Gulbenkian award.

== Archives ==
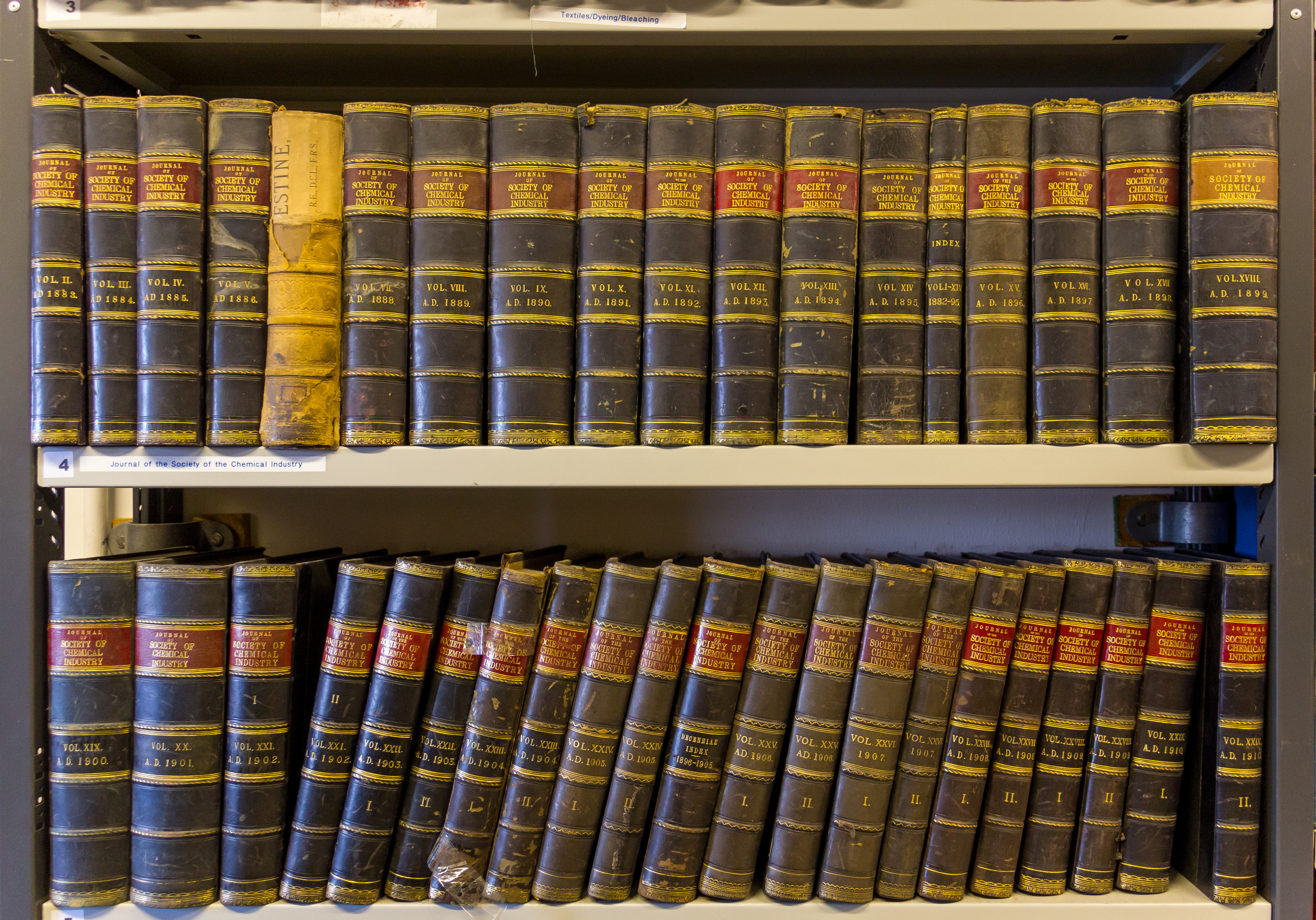
The centre contains an archive of historic texts relating to the chemical industry.

The museum holds a collection of archives relating to the chemical industry. The collection was started in 1982 with the setting up of the Halton Chemical Industry Museum Project as a project funded by the Manpower Services Commission and Halton Borough Council. The collection consists of nearly 8,000 individually numbered items and groups including objects, archive material and photographs. However, in terms of physical numbers of individual items and items within groups, the number of items approaches 10,000. If the individual research files from the ICI General Chemicals Group are also included then the collection would exceed 35,000 items. More information about the collections can be found on the Catalyst website.

The archives include company documents of all kinds, product brochures and general ephemera, consisting of documents, photographs and the entire research archive of the ICI General Chemical Division (including pre-war personal injury records), Peter Spence Archive, Hutchinson Dock Estate Papers, and the Clayton Aniline Company Archive, McKechnie Brothers ledgers, the Vine Chemicals/Barium Chemicals Limited documents, documents from J.W. Towers and Company (later Gallenkamps).

The photographic collection, consisting of 35mm negatives and photographs, documents products and processes, company history, social activity and local history from Merseyside, South Lancashire, and North and Mid Cheshire areas. The collection also houses photographic material from the Teesside Bridge & Engineering Company. They also hold on loan the Brunner Mond film collection. The library comprises several sets of bound volumes including the Journal for Society of Chemical Industry, and the Imperial Chemical Industries magazine and newspaper. There are also many individual volumes relating to aspects of chemistry and industry, and to local area.

The map collection consists of Ordnance Survey maps of Widnes and Runcorn, and includes various Halton Borough Council annotated maps such as the sewer system in Halton, two complete sets of Ropers 1875 survey, a bound set of plans of the proposed Lancashire Plateway relating to Widnes and a set of Widnes-Runcorn Transporter Bridge bound plans. The fine art collection ranges from portraits of local chemical manufacturers in oils and pastel, and depictions of local factories. The collection also includes bronze busts and plaques.

== See also ==
- List of museums in Cheshire
- Listed buildings in Widnes
- List of science centers in Europe
