= St Mary's Church, Widnes =

Coordinates: 53.3488°N 2.7329°W

- St. Mary's Church, West Bank, Widnes
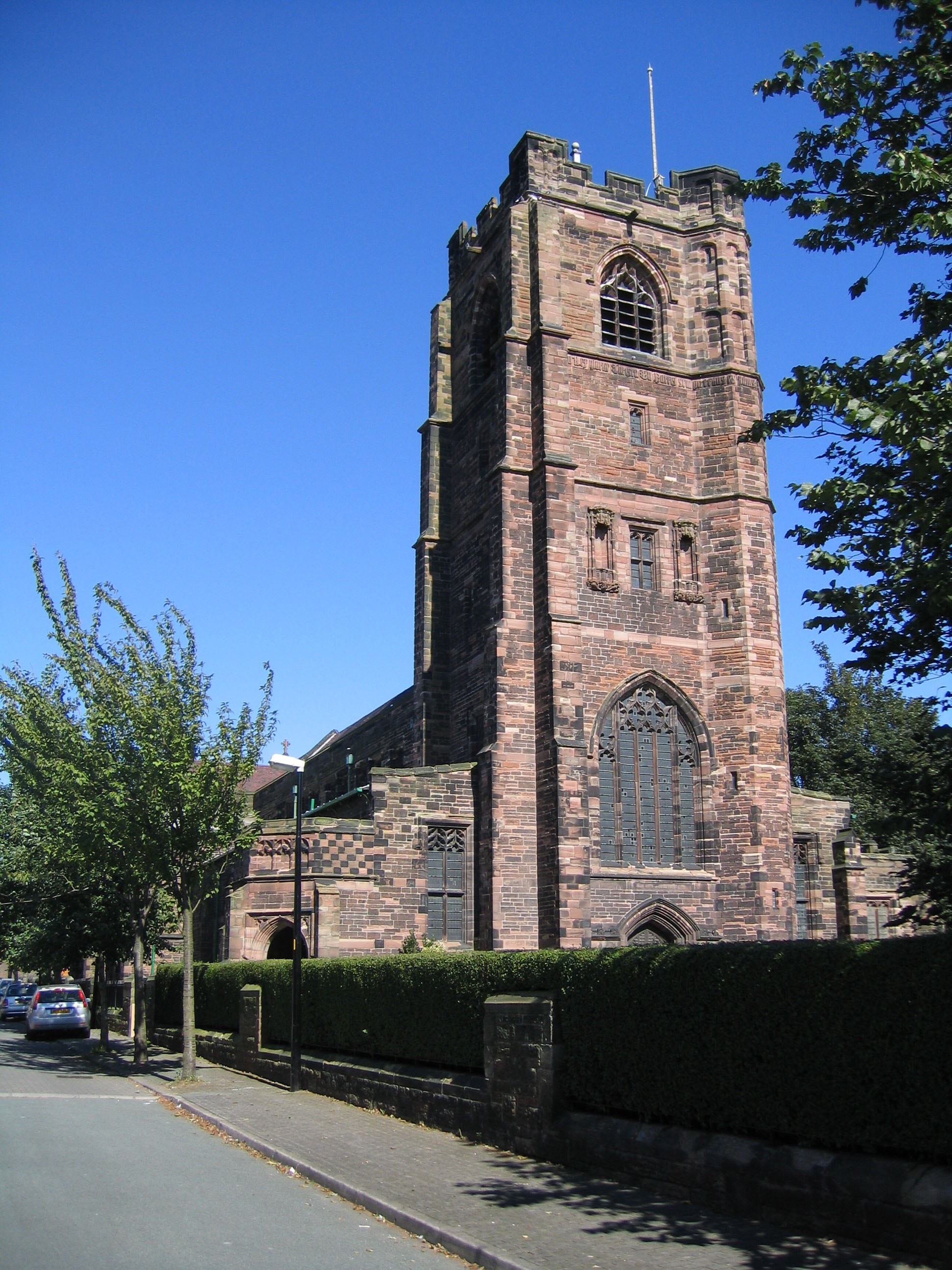
- St Mary's Church, Widnes, from the West

- Location in Cheshire
- OS grid reference: SJ 513,838
- Location: Widnes, Cheshire
- Country: England
- Denomination: Anglican
- Churchmanship: Evangelical
- Website: St Mary, Widnes

History
- Status: Parish church
- Consecrated: 1910

Architecture
- Functional status: Active
- Heritage designation: Grade II*
- Designated: 31 October 1983
- Architect: Austin and Paley
- Architectural type: Church
- Style: Gothic Revival
- Groundbreaking: 1908
- Completed: 1910
- Construction cost: £16,669

Specifications
- Capacity: 770
- Length: 1,785 feet (544 m)
- Width: 80 feet (24 m)
- Materials: Red sandstone Roofs of Ruabon tiles and lead

Administration
- Province: York
- Diocese: Liverpool
- Archdeaconry: Warrington
- Deanery: Widnes
- Parish: St Mary, Widnes

Clergy
- Rector: Revd Janice Collier
- Vicar: Revd Jeremy Duff

St Mary's Church is in the West Bank area of Widnes, Cheshire, England. The church is recorded in the National Heritage List for England as a designated Grade II* listed building. It is an active Anglican parish church in the diocese of Liverpool, the archdeaconry of Warrington and the deanery of Widnes. Together with the churches of St Paul, Widnes, and St Mary, Hale, it forms the South Widnes Team. It has been described as "the last great church masterpiece" created by the Lancaster architects Austin and Paley. (Note: The church is also described by Brandwood et al as "a magnificent essay in space and light, equal to, if very different from, the best churches of the time by masters such as Giles Gilbert Scott and Temple Moore".)

== History ==
The first church in West Bank, known as Widnes Dock Church and dedicated to St Mary, was opened in 1858. This church was never completed and consisted only of the nave. It had been built on chemical waste which subsided, leading to bulging of the walls and twisting of the roof. In the early 1900s a new site was obtained near the promenade, and money was raised for a new church. The foundation stone was laid on 14 May 1908 and the church was opened on 12 November 1910. The church was designed by Austin and Paley, cost £16,669 in total (equivalent to £1,700,000 in 2025), which included £5,400 for the site, and provided seating for 770 people.

== Architecture ==
=== Exterior ===
The church is built in red flecked sandstone, and the nave roof is in Ruabon tiles. The aisle roofs are in lead. Its plan consists of a five-bay nave with a clerestory, north and south aisles which embrace a west tower, and north and south transepts, a chancel. The northwest porch is set at an angle to the church and the south porch is perpendicular to it. The church is built in Perpendicular style. The north transept is in one bay and includes the organ. The south transept is in three bays and forms a Lady chapel. The tower has a projecting octagonal staircase on the southeast corner and buttresses on the southeast corner. An inscribed frieze of the Te Deum runs around the tower and below the parapet of the south and east sides of the church.

=== Interior ===
The furnishings are of oak and were designed by the architects. The font is made of Darley Dale stone. The stained glass in the east window depicts the Ascension and an Apocalyptic Vision and was designed by Shrigley and Hunt. The three-manual organ was built by Wm. Hill and Son in 1902 and restored and enlarged between 1936 and 1947 by Henry Willis & Sons.

== External features ==
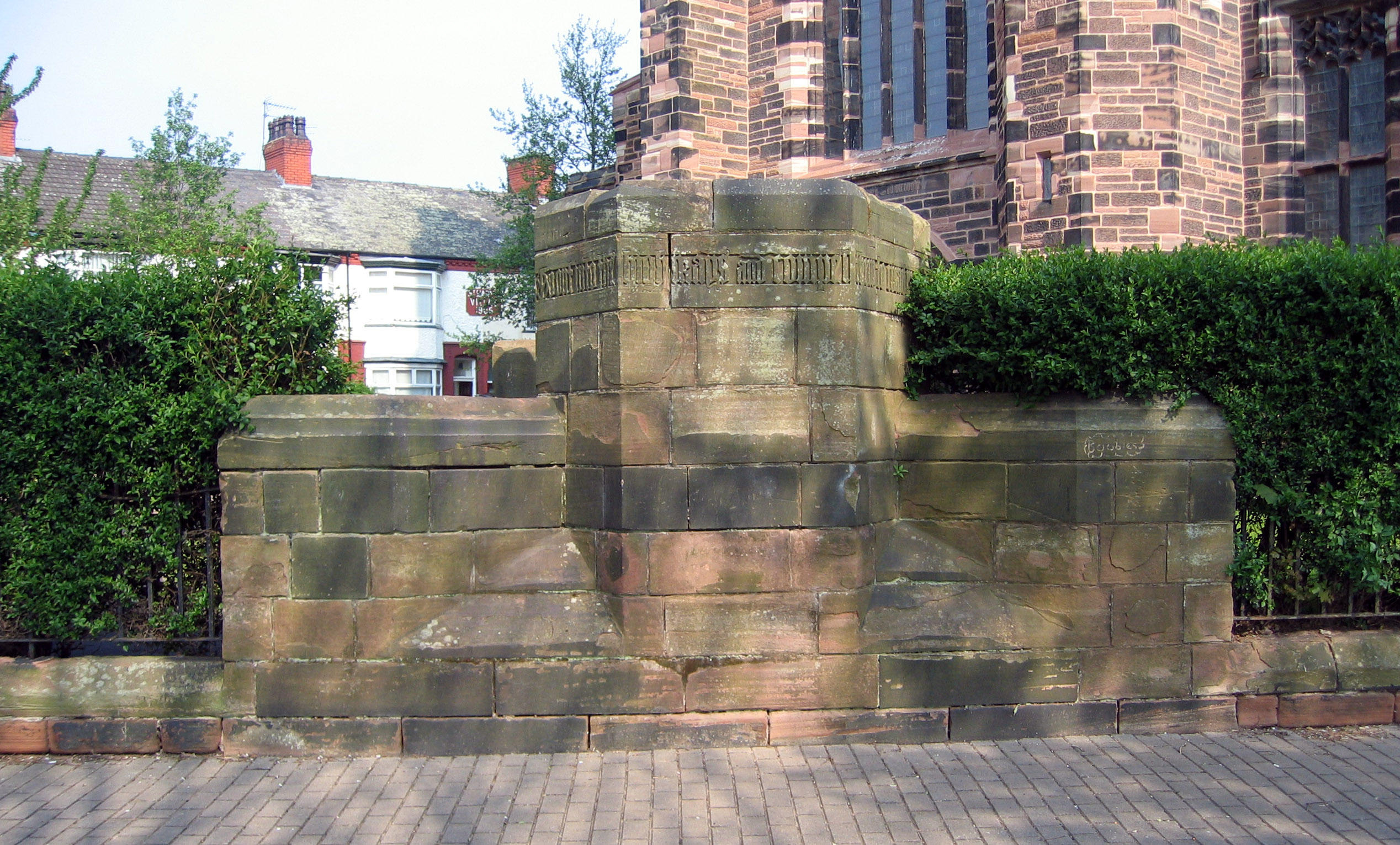
Wayside pulpit

An octagonal wayside pulpit is set into the boundary wall of the church. Also designed by Austin and Paley, it is constructed in red sandstone and approached by six steps. The text "Go out into the highways and compel them to come in that my house may be filled" (from Luke 14:23) is cut into its masonry. It is listed at Grade II.

== See also ==
- Grade I and II* listed buildings in Halton (borough)
- Listed buildings in Widnes
- List of ecclesiastical works by Austin and Paley (1895–1914)
