= Widnes War Memorial =

War memorial in Widnes, Cheshire, England

Coordinates: 53.37454°N 2.73039°W

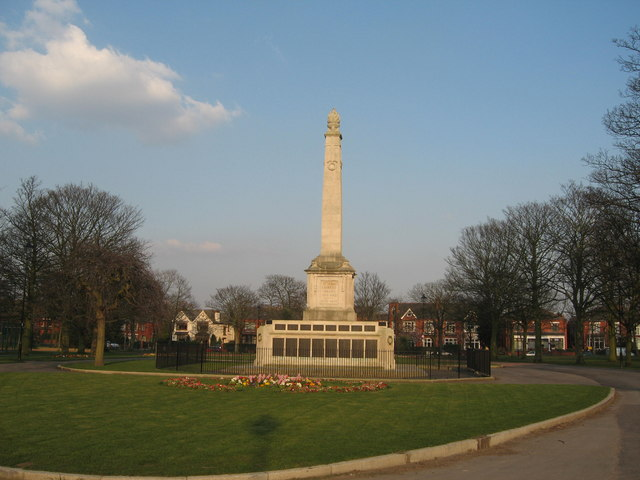
Widnes War Memorial

Widnes War Memorial stands in Victoria Park, Widnes, Cheshire, England. It commemorates the serving men who lost their lives in the two world wars. The memorial consists of an obelisk in Portland stone on a plinth of York stone. It was unveiled in 1921, and more names were added in 1950. The monument is recorded in the National Heritage List for England as a designated Grade II listed building.

== History ==
Widnes Borough Council commissioned a memorial in 1920 to commemorate the citizens of the town who fell in the First World War. Following a competition the design of Harold E. Davies was selected, and Herbert Tyson Smith was appointed as the sculptor. The building contractors were Messrs. Stewart Jones of Liverpool. The foundation stone was laid on 28 August 1920, and the memorial was unveiled on 28 September 1921. This ceremony included a procession from the Town Hall led by the mayor and the 17th Earl of Derby. The memorial was paid for by public subscription which raised £7,830, against a target of £10,000. However the memorial cost only £6,000, and the remainder was used as a social fund towards the poor of the town. An inscription and plaques were added to commemorate those lost in the Second World War, and these were unveiled in April 1950.

In February 2015 Engraved stones were unveiled to honour 62 "forgotten" men who died in World War One, but were not listed on the Cheshire town's cenotaph. The new memorial in Victoria Park, Widnes, follows researcher Michael McNicholas spotting the omissions as he worked on a book about the war.

== Description ==
The memorial consists of an obelisk in Portland stone standing on a stepped plinth in York stone. The obelisk is about 12.8 metres (42 ft) high on a plinth about 2.1 metres (7 ft) in height. Around the plinth are 30 bronze tablets inscribed with the names of the 818 men who died in the First World War. On the base of the obelisk is the coat of arms of Widnes. At the top of the obelisk is a flaming urn to symbolise immortality. The corners of the plinth are angled and contain carved laurel wreathes. Higher in the plinth are eight bronze tablets with the names of those lost in the Second World War. Towards the top of the obelisk on all four faces are crosses carved in relief. Below the crosses on the north and south sides are palm branches, and below those on the east and west sides are laurel wreathes.

In a panel on the front (south) side of the plinth is an inscription reading as follows.

ERECTED BY THE CITIZENS
OF THE BOROUGH OF WIDNES
IN COMMEMORATION OF THE
MEN OF THIS PLACE WHO MADE
THE SUPREME SACRIFICE IN
THE GREAT WAR OF 1914 – 1919
THIS FOUNDATION STONE WAS
LAID 28TH AUGUST 1920 BY
ALDERMAN EDWIN WOOD – MAYOR

On the same face, above the smaller plaques, is an inscription reading as follows.

IN MEMORY OF THE MEN OF WIDNES WHO GAVE THEIR LIVES
1939 – 1945
UNVEILED BY ALDERMAN T SWALE MAYOR 12TH APRIL 1950

On the front of the base of the obelisk is an inscription reading:

THIS MEMORIAL WAS UNVEILED
SEPTEMBER 28TH 1921 BY THE
RIGHT HON THE EARL OF DERBY KG

On the left (west) side the inscription reads:

TO OUR
GLORIOUS
DEAD
1914 – 1919
1939 – 1945

On the right side the inscription is:

THE BLOOD
OF HEROES
IS THE SEED
OF FREEDOM

And at the back is inscribed:

THEIR NAME
LIVETH FOR
EVERMORE

== Appraisal ==
The monument was designated as a Grade II listed building on 21 August 2007. Grade II is the lowest of the three grades of listing and is applied to "buildings of national importance and special interest". In the citation for listing it is described as being "intricately carved and highly imposing", it incorporates "symbolic imagery" and "richly detailed carvings", making it a "striking and prominent architectural feature". Pollard and Pevsner in the Buildings of England series describe it as being "impressive and dignified".

== See also ==
- Listed buildings in Widnes
