= Spike Island, Widnes =

Park in Widnes

Spike Island
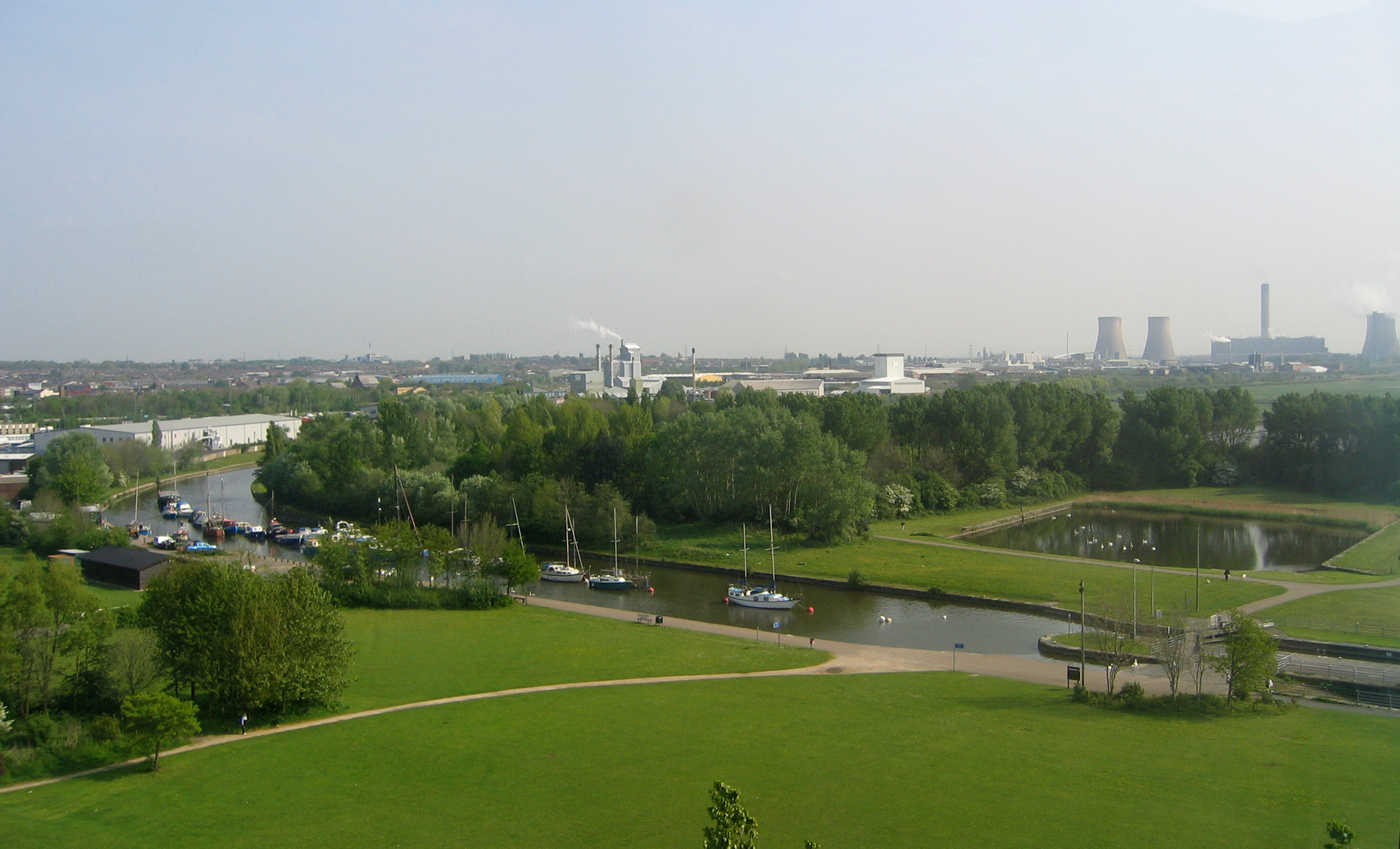
- Spike Island viewed from the Catalyst Science Discovery Centre in 2007
- Interactive map of Spike Island
- Type: Park and urban open space
- Location: Widnes, Cheshire, England
- Coordinates: 53°21′14″N 2°43′50″W
- Operator: Halton Borough Council

Spike Island is a park in Widnes, Halton, North West England. It is an artificial island between the Sankey Canal and the estuary of the River Mersey containing parkland, woodland, wetlands and footpaths. It is next to the Catalyst Science Discovery Centre, an interactive science and technology museum.

Spike Island was at the centre of the British chemical industry during the Industrial Revolution. In 1833, Widnes Dock, the world's first rail-to-ship dock, was built on the island. In 1848, John Hutchinson built the first chemical factory in Widnes on the island. The chemical industry in Widnes grew rapidly thereafter. By the 1970s no working chemical factories remained, and from 1975 onwards the island was cleaned up and turned over to public recreation.

A famous concert by the rock band the Stone Roses, subsequently the subject of an eponymous film (2012), took place on the island in May 1990. The pop band Pulp have released two singles using the concert as a theme: "Sorted for E's & Wizz" (1995) and "Spike Island" (2025).

== History ==
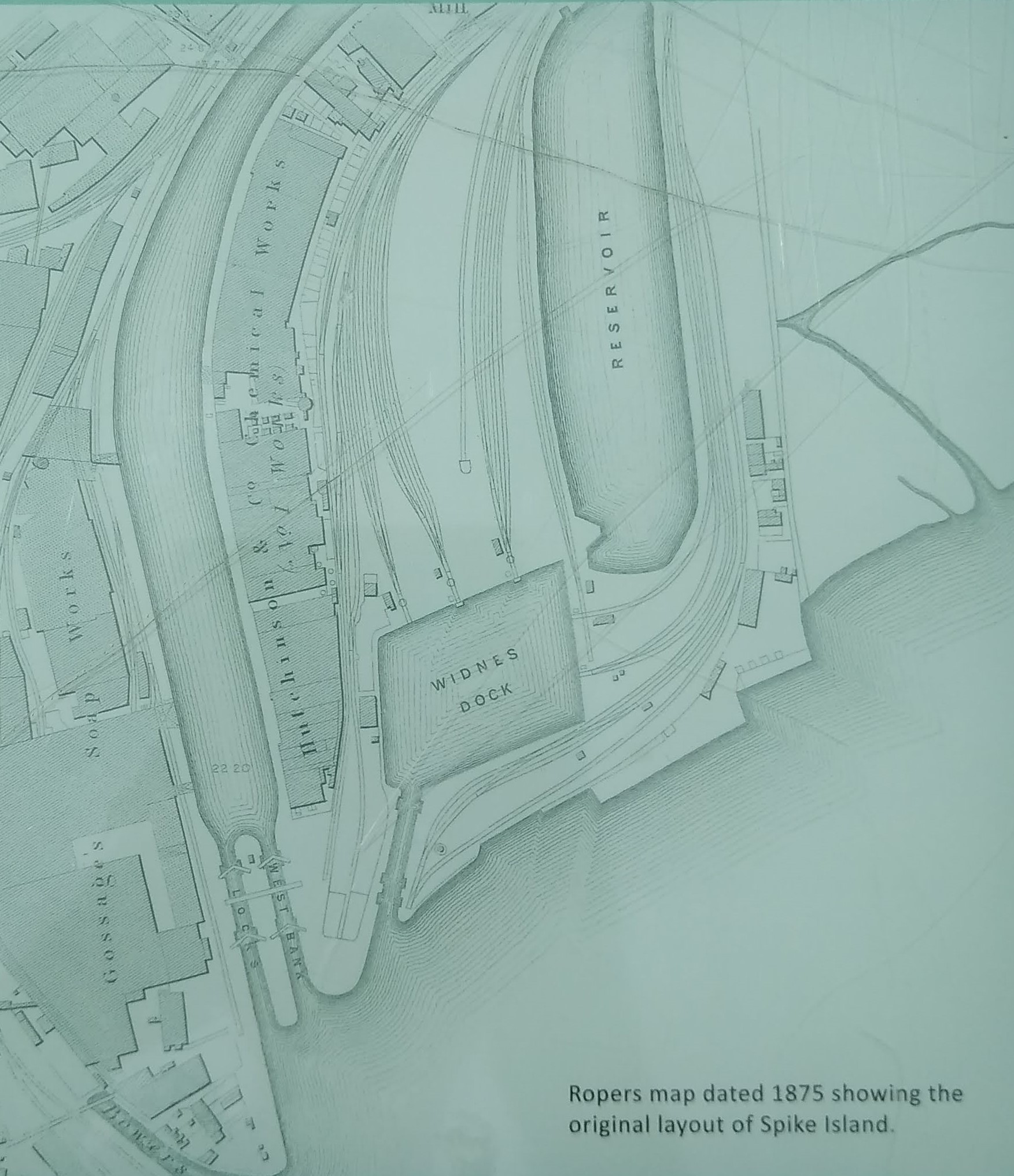
Drawing of the island in 1875

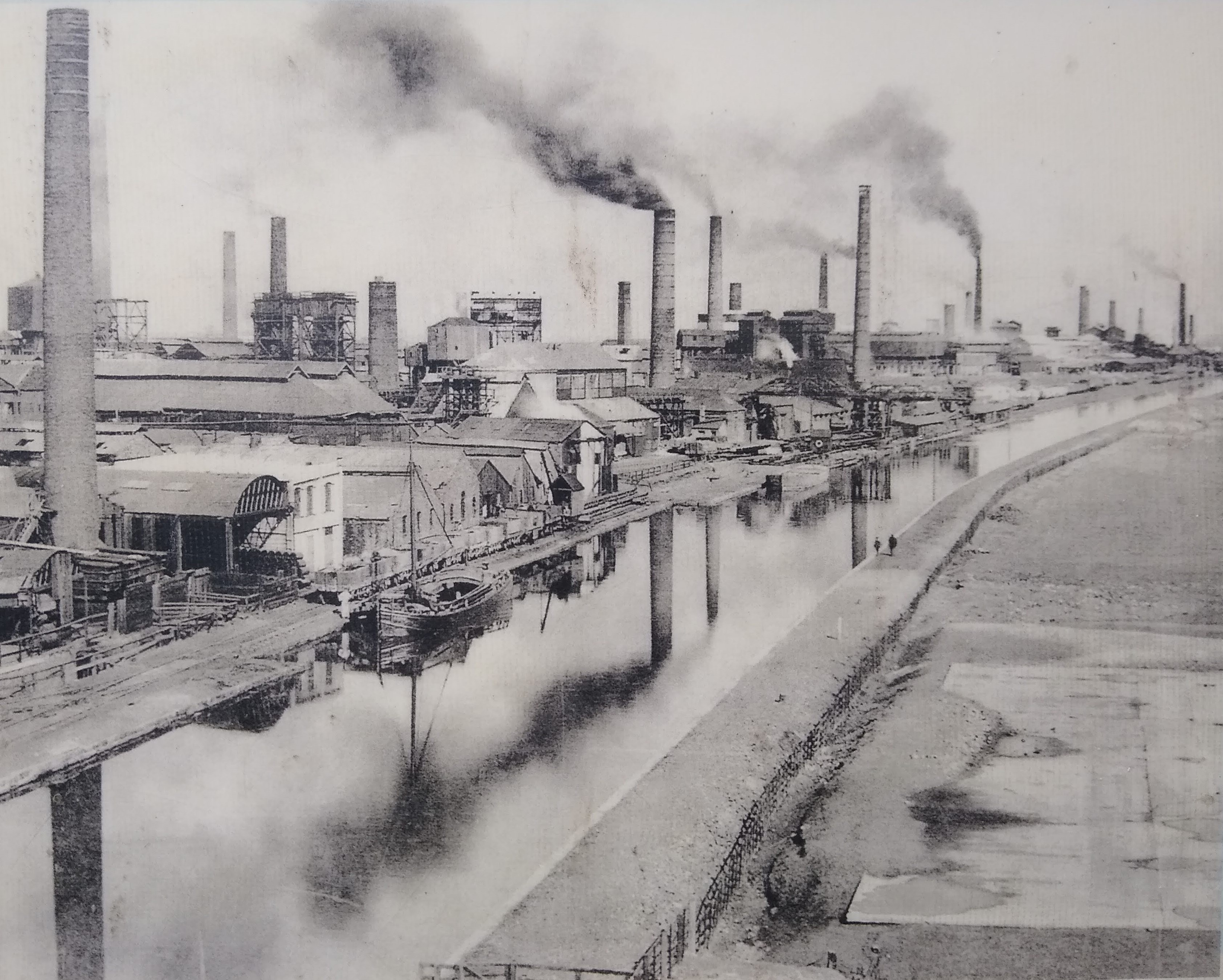
View of the Sankey Canal from Spike island, c. 1900

Spike Island is an artificial island created in 1833 when the Sankey Canal was extended from Fiddler's Ferry to the River Mersey at Widnes. The extension separated a section of Widnes previously called Woodend from the remainder of the town. The island takes its name from one meaning of the word "spike" - a cheap boarding house, used by transient factory workers and common on the island at this time.

Widnes Dock, built in 1833, was the first rail-to-ship dock in the world. Uniquely, the dock allowed goods, such as coal, to be taken off a train and deposited directly into a boat for transport along the River Mersey to other parts of the UK and abroad. Goods and raw materials could also be brought in by boat and deposited directly onto a train for onward travel to local factories. The dock was topped up with water from the nearby reservoir to prevent its level becoming too low when the River Mersey was at low tide. Widnes Dock was last used commercially in 1931 but the island remained in use as a railway sidings. The island had a network of interlinked railway lines which, being at the end of the line, were ideal for marshalling trains and freight storage. The railway lines became known as "Marsh Sidings". They were taken over by British Rail in 1948 and remained in use until 1968.

Large ships are unable to sail far up the River Mersey because the water level is too low. Consequently Widnes Dock was accessed by Mersey flat boats, which could transport goods downstream to the Port of Liverpool or along the canal network. The dock could hold up to 40 vessels, and have a single Mersey flat loaded with 70 tons of coal from a railway wagon, and en route to Liverpool in 40 minutes. The Mersey flats were small flat-bottomed sailing barges that originated on the Mersey but were later used on rivers elsewhere. They were a common sight in the 19th century. The wreck of a Mersey flat called the Eustace Carey can be seen at Spike Island at low tide.

Beginning in 1848, John Hutchinson built the first chemical factory in Widnes on Spike Island. It was called "Hutchinson's No 1 Works" and was constructed along the Sankey Canal near Widnes Dock. Thereafter chemical factories proliferated in the town. Around the year 1860 Hutchinson built Tower Building, which he used as the administrative headquarters of his chemical business. Later it became the head office of the Gossage soap company, which at one time was the largest soap company in the UK and handled half of the UK's soap exports. Today, Tower Building houses the Catalyst Science Discovery Centre. Hutchinson was described by his contemporaries as "the father of Widnes" because of his influence on the growth of the chemical industry in the town.

The island was at the centre of the British chemical industry during the 19th century and part of the Industrial Revolution. The chemical industry for the first time allowed the mass production of soap, bleaching powder, glass and fertilizer, amongst other products. The population of Widnes grew rapidly; however, the industry also brought exceptional levels of pollution. The town was described as one of the dirtiest and most dangerous places to work in England, and in 1905 as a "poisonous hell-town". In the 20th century, changes to the industry and new environmental laws led to the decline of the chemical industry. By the 1970s, Spike Island contained abandoned chemical factories, rail lines, disused canal and industrial dockage, and extensive chemical pollution. Between 1975 and 1982, the island was reclaimed and returned to green spaces. All of the chemical works were removed and only two former pyrite kilns remain. The canal passes from the West Bank Locks on Spike Island to Warrington and then into St. Helens town centre. The canal fell into disuse and closed in 1963. The canal footpath now forms part of the Trans Pennine Trail.

== Facilities ==
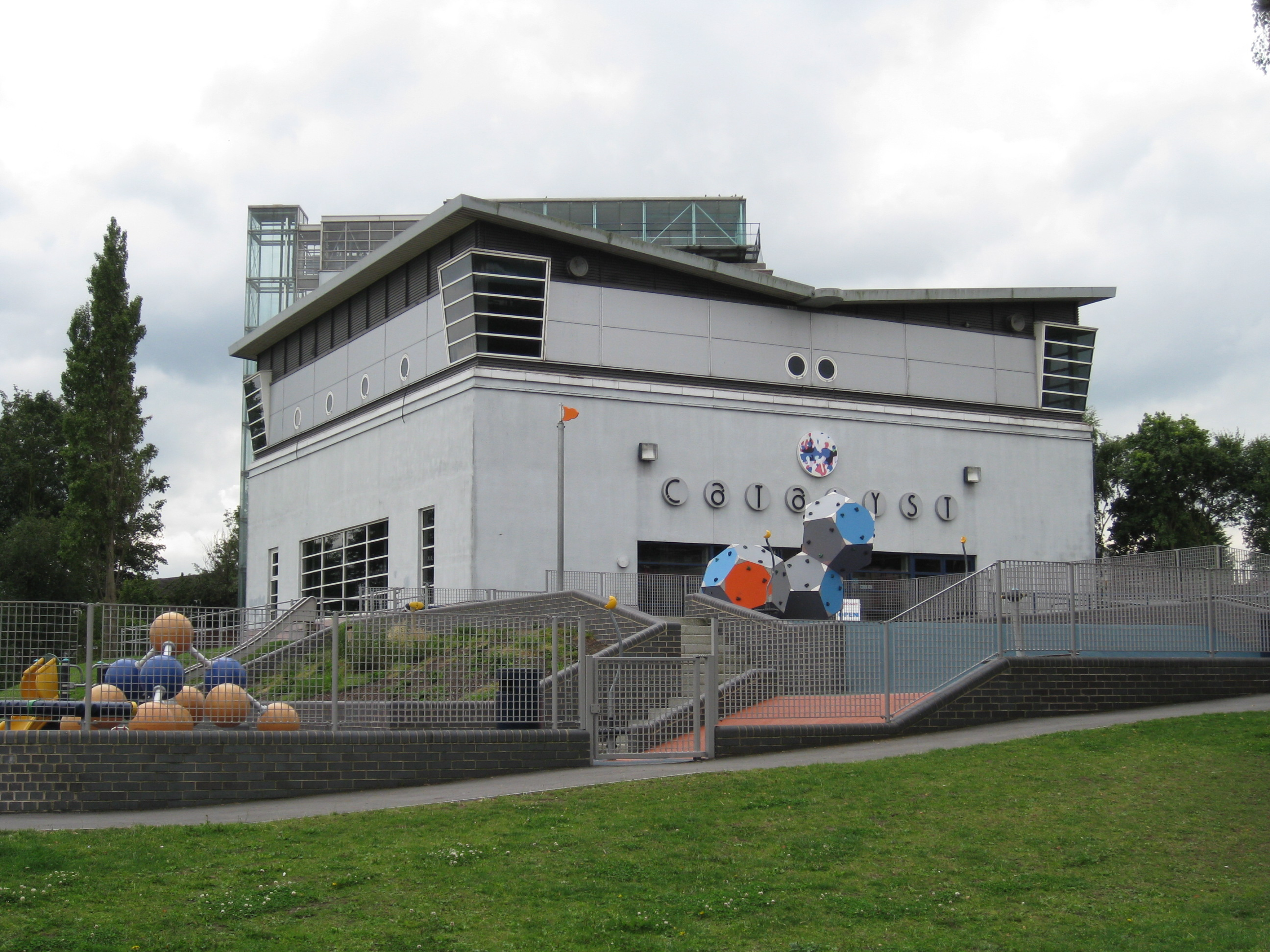
The Catalyst Science Discovery Centre at Spike Island in 2011

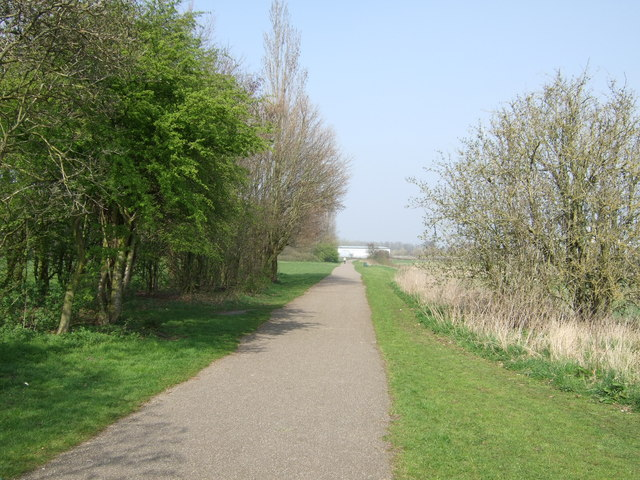
The Trans Pennine Trail passing through Spike Island, 2012

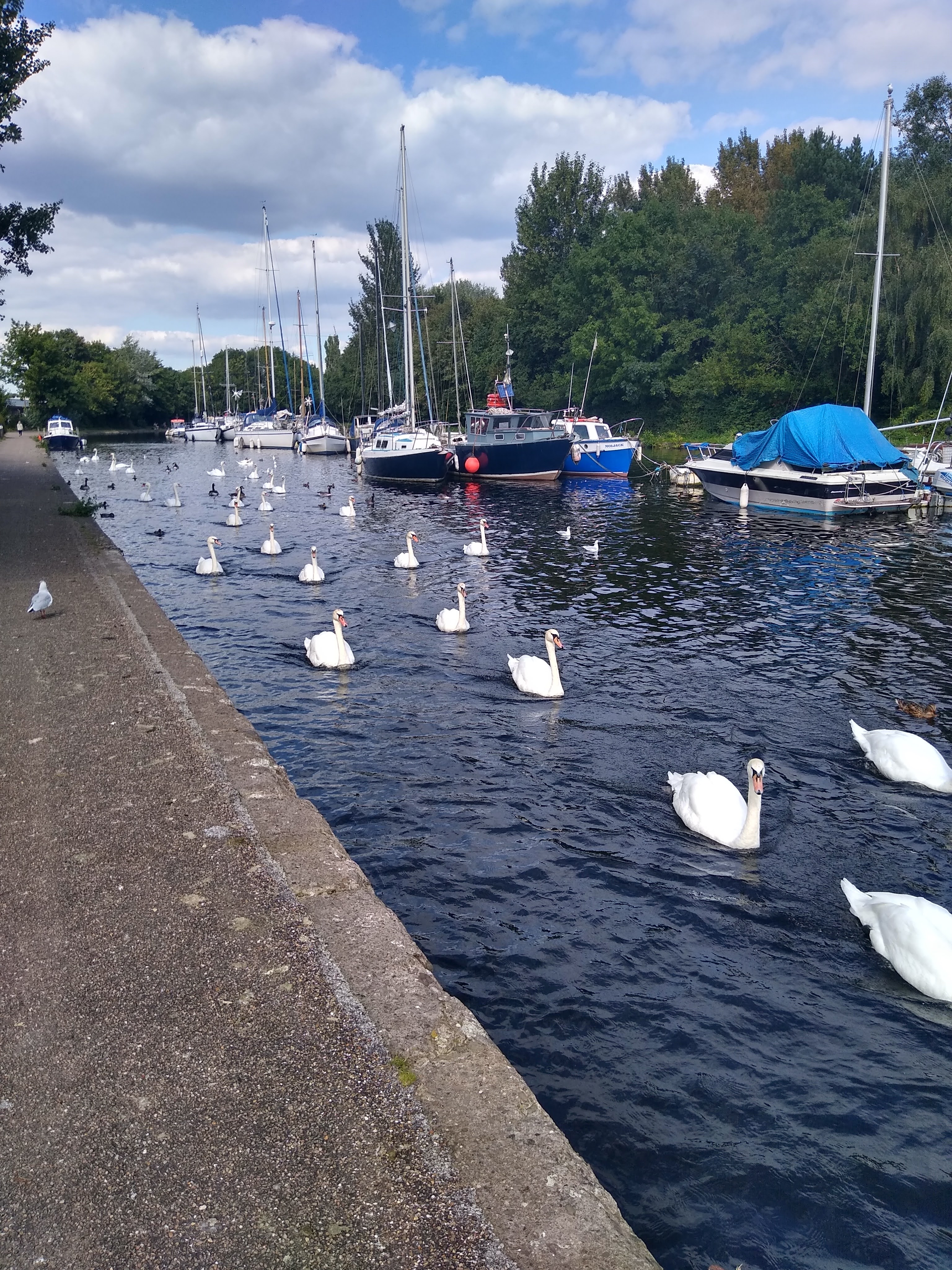
Swans swimming down the canal at Spike Island in 2020

The island is maintained by Halton Borough Council, who describe the island as "Open parkland with items of industrial archaeological interest and a canal". There are footpaths, canal walks, cycle paths, woodland, wetlands, views of the River Mersey and the Mersey Gateway Bridge, birdlife, fishing, industrial heritage, picnic tables, car parking, a multi-purpose sports pitch and a children's play area. The Trans Pennine Trail passes through the parkland. Mersey riverboats are moored in the Sankey Canal. The canal, although in water, is not navigable past the island.

The Catalyst Science Discovery Centre is a museum dedicated to science and in particular chemistry. It is next to the island and charts the history of Widnes and Spike Island, offering hands-on displays, static displays and live science lectures. There are 80 interactive exhibits and reconstructed scenes bringing science, maths, engineering and technology to life. Two teaching spaces host a range of workshops and there is a café. There is an observatory on the top floor accessed via a glass-walled lift. The observatory offers panoramic views of the river, Widnes and the Mersey Gateway Bridge, which was opened in 2017.

== In popular culture ==
Spike Island was the site of a famous outdoor concert by the rock band the Stone Roses in May 1990. The support acts included DJs Dave Haslam, Paul Oakenfold and Frankie Bones, a Zimbabwean drum orchestra and the reggae artist Gary Clail. The NME wrote "Spike Island was to be the Roses' defining statement, a celebration of not only their own success, but of an entire youth culture" and also "It was a real moment in time; the beginning of a long hot summer that saw England nearly go all the way in the World Cup, the peak of a period when Manchester and the north-west felt like the centre of the universe." 30,000 people attended the concert; the organisation was described as "amateurish", and this increased the fame of the event. The police informed the organisers that the tide was so high that everyone might have to be taken off the island. As the Stone Roses took to the stage a cloud of red dust formed in front of the stage, triggering asthma attacks among some members of the crowd.

A film about the concert called Spike Island was released in 2012. The film is a comedy and coming-of-age drama that focuses on a "wannabee" band who idolise the Stone Roses and set out to deliver their demo tape personally to the Roses at the concert. Emma Dibdin of Digital Spy wrote that within its limited remit it is an affable watch, but the "domestic drama our heroes are running from never resonates". Dibdin added that the "performances are charming, and within the predictable tropes there are genuinely powerful moments."

The Pulp song "Sorted for E's & Wizz" is inspired by one girl's memories of the concert. Jarvis Cocker remarked that he'd spoken to the girl about the concert and she could remember virtually nothing apart from the drug taking. In 2025, Pulp released their second song about the concert, "Spike Island". Thom Donovan, reviewing the song in American Songwriter, wrote "the legend around the disappointing concert provides Cocker with a metaphor for how nostalgia polishes bad memories."

A tribute concert on the island by "the Clone Roses" was planned for May 2020, thirty years after the original concert. The event was rescheduled for 2021 as public gatherings were prohibited because of the COVID-19 pandemic. The music festival took place on 24 July 2021; it was called "Spike Island: The Resurrection" and was headlined by the Clone Roses, with other 1990s tribute bands such as Oas-is, Happy Mondaze and True Order also featuring.

== See also ==
- List of parks and open spaces in Cheshire
- List of islands of England
- List of artificial islands
- Land reclamation
- Land recycling
- Polder
- Mount Manisty
- Stanlow Island
- Wigg Island
