= Gossage =

Gossage is a family name of soapmakers and alkali manufacturers. Their company eventually became part of the Unilever group. During World War II, all soap brands were abolished by British government decree in 1942, in favour of a generic soap. When conditions returned to normal post war, the Gossage brand was not revived by Unilever though the company name is still registered for legal purposes. The online 'Times Index' shows meetings of the Gossage company board until the early 1960s.

== Family history ==
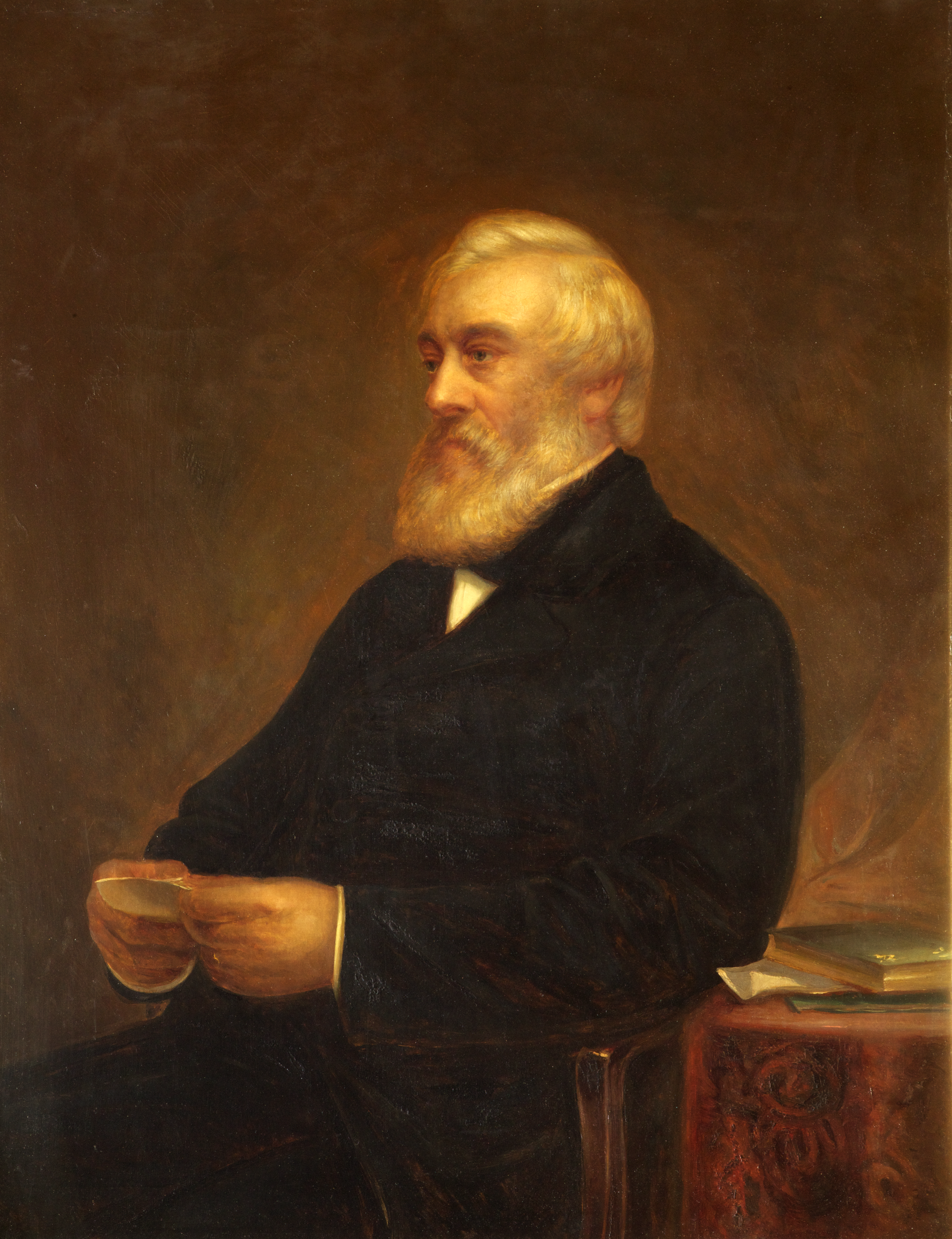
Portrait of William Gossage in the collection of Catalyst Science Discovery Centre

William Gossage (1799–1877) was the founder of the dynasty and the youngest of 13 children. He was born in Burgh in the Marsh, near Skegness, Lincolnshire. He had his chemical training from his uncle, a druggist in Chesterfield to whom he was apprenticed at the age of 12, in 1823. He set up in business at Leamington, where he made Leamington Salts. There he met a girl and was married in 1830. Their first son was Alfred Howard Gossage, born 1830. The following year he fathered another son, Frederick Herbert Gossage (1831–1907).

Around the same year of 1830, he set up partnership with Mr Farndon to form the British Alkali Works at Stoke Prior, Worcestershire. British alkali meant sodium carbonate made by the Leblanc Process. The process involved the use of coal, limestone, salt and sulphuric acid, which produced copious quantities of hydrogen chloride. The noxious gas destroyed the crops of nearby farmers. By 1836 Gossage had solved the problem with his Gossage Tower.

Gossage left Stoke Prior for Birmingham in 1841, where he entered the white lead trade. In 1844 he switched locations and businesses again, becoming a copper smelter in South Wales. However, he would return to Stoke Prior in 1848.

In 1850 he made his final move, to Widnes in Lancashire, where he set up a copper smelter. Vast quantities of iron pyrites (FeS) were burnt in the town. to produce sulphur compounds for the sulphuric acid vital for the Leblanc Process. Copper was a common impurity in pyrites, and he devised a way to extract from the burnt pyrites. However, as soon as the pyrites mine owners heard of his process, they adopted it themselves. Gossage ruefully observed:

"That is the worst of telling people you can get something out of their refuse"

Gossage continued soda making in Widnes, patenting important new methods in 1852. His greatest commercial success was with 'silicated soap', pure soap with sodium silicate added. The corrosive water glass had to be neutralised somewhat by additives such as starch. His original patent for silicated soap was patent BP 762/54, patented on 3 April 1854, rapidly followed with patents for the addition of other substances to the mixture. Examples are patents 826 and 908, for firming up the soap with the addition of 'wheat flour or other farinaceous substance', or 'finely divided china clay or flints'. Patent 908 also extended protection to silicated soaps made by the cold process (saponification without the addition of external heat). In 1856 provisional patent 252, full patent 1293, was for adding extra fatty acids or salts of 'lime, magnesia, ammonia, alumina or mixtures of same. Patent 2100 of 1856 was also concerned with making the soap milder. The silicated soap could be made and sold for two pennies per pound, compared to six for normal soaps.

In 1857 he introduced 'mottled soap' which had a marbled appearance. This became a best seller, domestically and abroad. It was protected by patent 1120 of 21 April 1857. The original blocks of soap were brown. Gossage called in James Hargreaves, (1834–1915) a local consultant chemist. After many sleepless nights they eventually discovered a way to produce a whitish soap with the mottle (particles of ultra marine) distributed evenly through it, producing a soap that looked rather like a blue cheese.

Other companies followed his lead- mottled soaps were widely made, by companies such as Christopher Price of Bristol. It is unclear whether they copied Gossage's ideas, or had some kind of licensing agreement.

Some sources say that the Gossage company was responsible for 50% of all the UK's soap exports in the 1860s and 1870s. Gossage made soaps for India and China. For domestic sale, it made special soaps, such as kosher soaps.

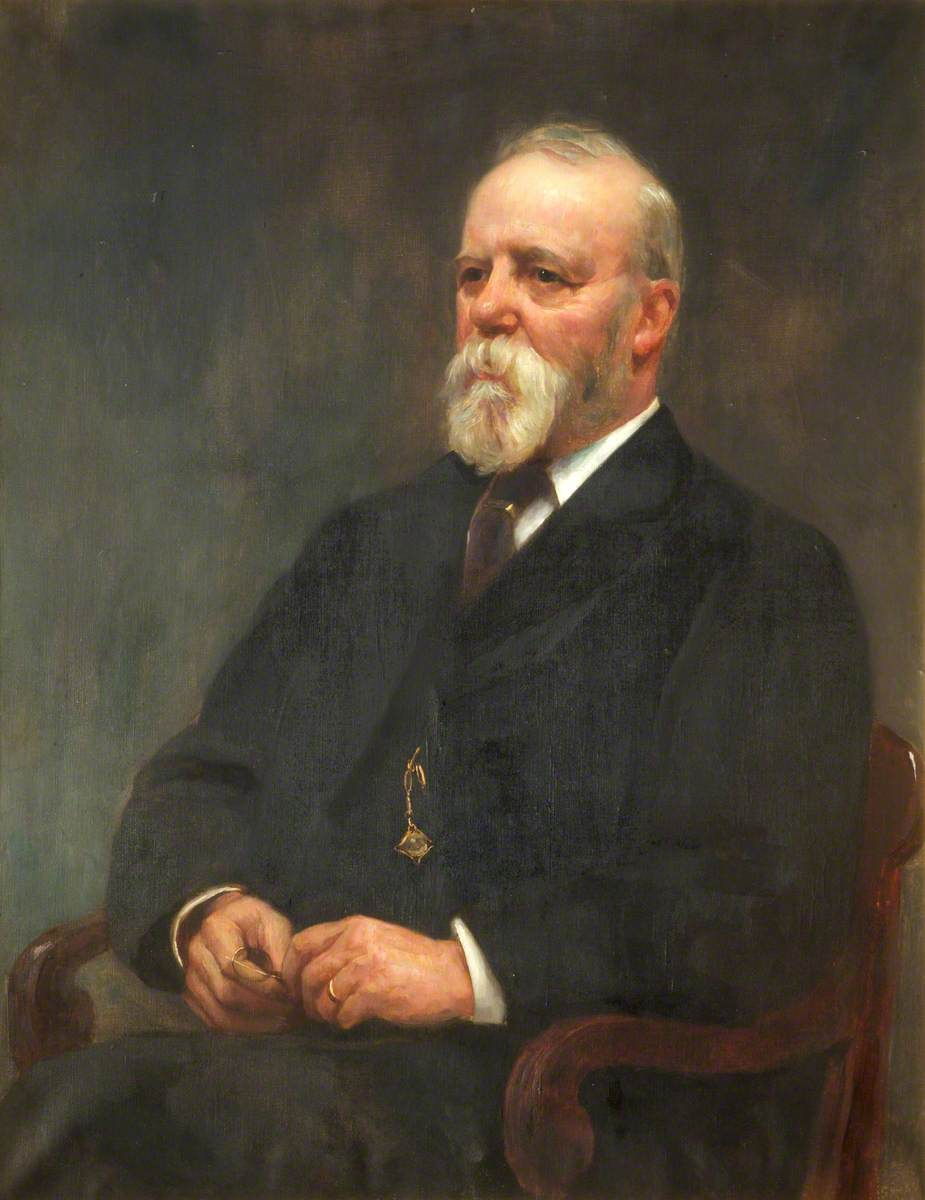
Frederick Herbert Gossage (1831–1907), Mayor of Widnes (1892–1893)

He retired from the business in the 1860s, leaving it to his sons Alfred and Frederick Herbert, and his astute business manager, Thomas Sutton Timmis. William Gossage died at his home in Bowdon, Cheshire on 9 April 1877, with less than £160,000 to his name.

The 1881 Census reports that Alfred was then described as 'retired soap manufacturer'. Frederick Herbert became the manager of the company. He left around £720,000 in his will.

== The Gossage Soap Company ==
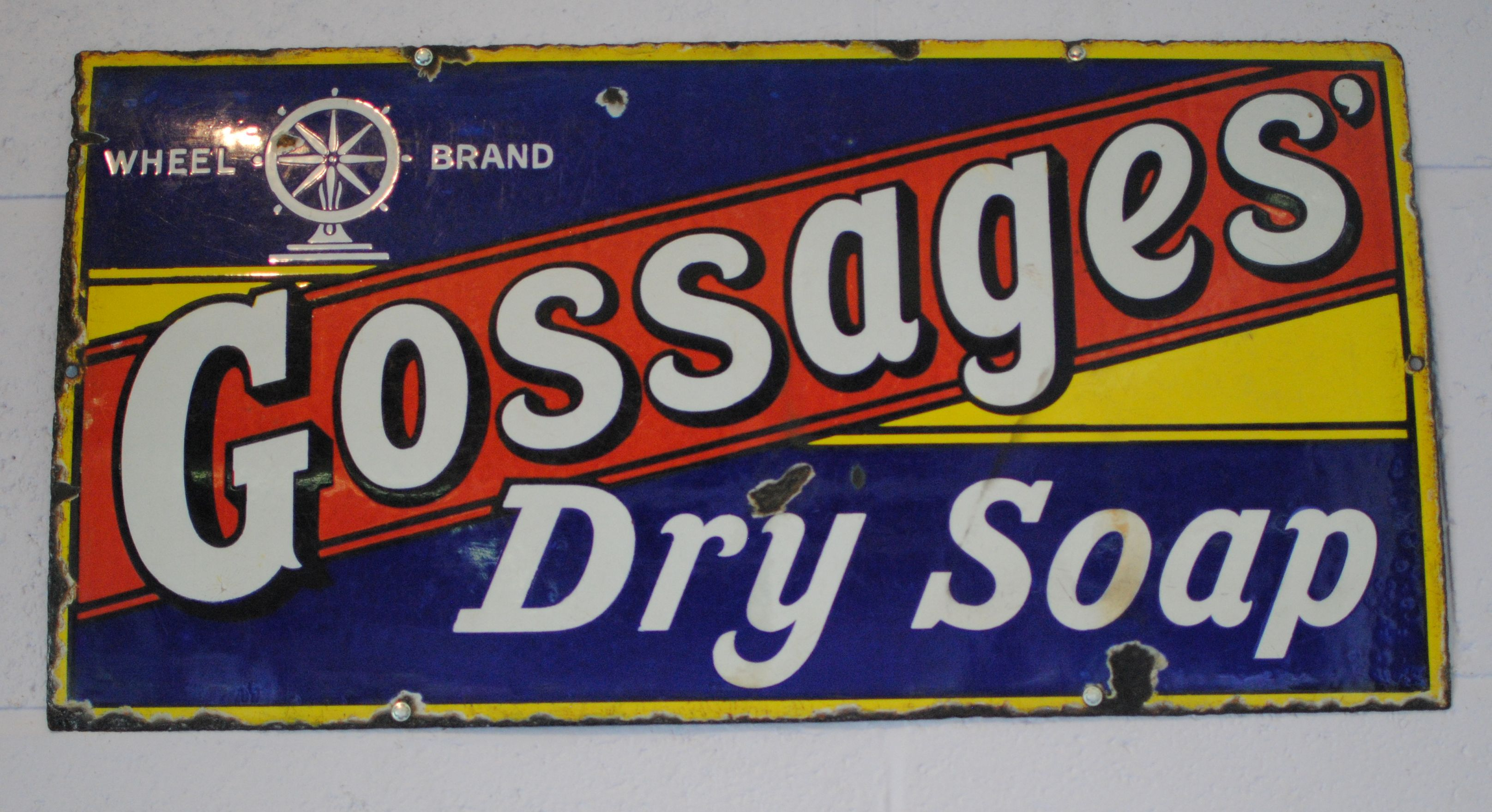
Enamel advertising sign, now in the cafe at Catalyst Science Discovery Centre

After their enormous success with silicated soap, the company faced a new threat from 1884. This was William Hesketh Lever's Sunlight soap. The new Sunlight was a technical and commercial novelty. Gossage's response was to produce their own similar soap, also wrapped, branded and advertised. This was 'Magical', whose logo included a wizard, and mystical symbols, such as crescent moons. This was successful, but other competitors also entered the market, such as Crosfields of Warrington and Hazelhursts of Runcorn.

In the early 1900s Lever's empire purchased Hudson's soap flake business. Hudson's soap flakes had been made under contract by Gossage's. Lever moved production to Port Sunlight. Gossage's soon produced an own brand soap flake. Unfortunately, Lever claimed they were using Hudson's (now Lever's) proprietary recipes, and sued the Gossage company. The resulting lawsuit damaged Gossage's finances and reputation. In 1910–1911, they were taken over by the Brunner-Mond company, alkali makers. During the Great War (1914–18) the company produced glycerine for the war effort. In peacetime, competition resumed. Brunner-Mond sold Gossage's and other soap companies to Lever, under an agreement: they would exit the soap market, and Lever would not make his own alkali, instead buying it from Brunner-Mond at preferable rates. So, by 1923, after complex negotiations, the Gossage factory became a Lever property.

By 1932, Lever Bros had joined with the Margarine Union of the Netherlands to form Unilever. By that year, 'Magical', and other brands were basically slight variants of 'Sunlight'. So, rationalisation meant the closure of the Widnes plant, and concentration of soap production at Port Sunlight.

The factory was demolished, save for the office buildings, which lay derelict for many years. From the 1980s they have formed the core of Catalyst Science Discovery Centre (formerly Catalyst Museum of the Chemical Industry). The waste ground near the Gossage Buildings formed the site of the Spike Island Festival of 1990.

== The Gossage Tower ==
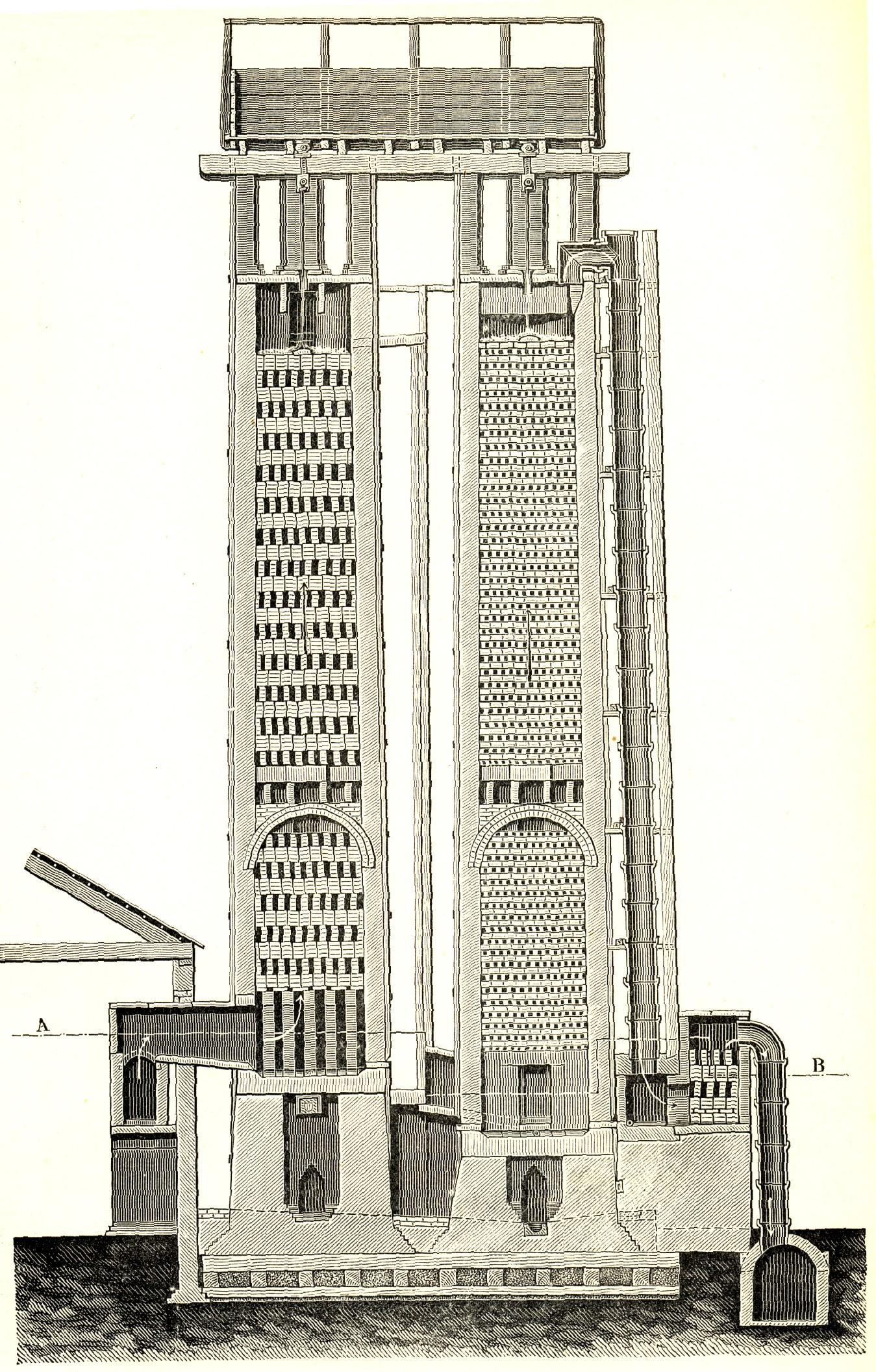
Absorption (Gossage) tower at John Hutchinson's Widnes works

The acid gas emitted by the Leblanc Process was a considerable nuisance. The first successful user of the process, James Muspratt in Liverpool, was forced from Everton due to complaints by neighbours. This was one reason why the early alkali makers set up in then remote spots such as Widnes, which they thought would be distant from litigious neighbours.

To absorb the waste gas, an apparatus was needed. Muriatic acid gas (HCl) was known to be soluble in water, but at that time it was thought that volume was the crucial variable and no known process could deliver the enormous quantities of water thought to be necessary.

In experiments at Stoke Prior, Gossage discovered that surface area, not volume, was the key to absorption (it is likely that he collaborated with Joseph Louis Gay-Lussac, who came to the same conclusion at about the same time in 1820s-1830s). He filled an old windmill with twigs and brushwood, and ran a trickle of water over the twigs. An early example of a packed bed, this made for a great surface area of water, able to absorb over 90% of the noxious gas. The dissolved gas created liquid hydrochloric acid. The liquid acid was poured into the local rivers and canals, replacing the vast amounts of air pollution with vast amounts of water pollution.

However, not all makers used the Gossage Tower; even Gossage himself may not have used it at his Widnes plant until all alkali makers were forced to use it by the Alkali Act 1863. In the 1880s chlorine became a valuable resource, used in bleaching powder and other products. Inventors such as Henry Deacon and Walter Weldon devised ways to extract chlorine from the hydrochloric acid, thereby ending the water pollution problem caused by the acid.

== Sources ==
- Hardie, D. W. F. (1950). A History of the Chemical Industry in Widnes. Widnes: ICI General Chemicals Division.
- Reed, Peter. N. (1984). "Gossage". A Dictionary of Business Biography. Vol. 2. London: Butterworth.
- "The Monster Nuisance of All: Landowners, Alkali Manufacturers and Air Pollution 1828–64". Economic History Review. 2nd series. 35. 1982.
- "Chemical Classics".
