= Mersey Gateway Bridge =

Toll bridge over the River Mersey, England

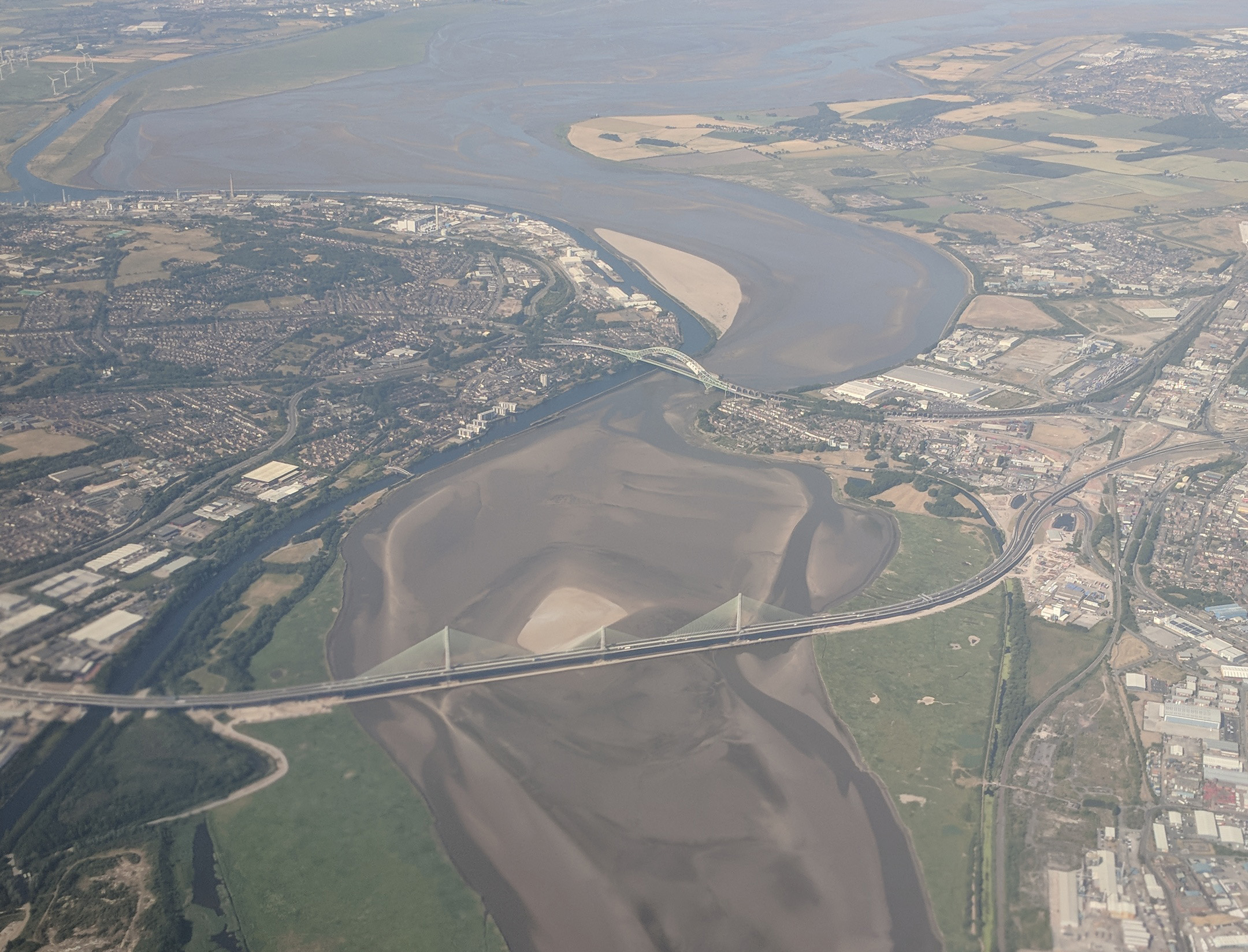
- The Mersey Gateway, with the older Silver Jubilee Bridge in the distance
- Coordinates: 53.3528°N 2.7130°W
- Carries: A533
- Crosses: River Mersey
- Locale: Halton
- Maintained by: Halton Borough Council
- Website: www.merseygateway.co.uk
- Followed by: Silver Jubilee Bridge

Characteristics
- Design: Cable-stayed
- Trough construction: Concrete and steel
- Pier construction: Concrete
- Total length: 2.2 km (1.4 miles)
- Width: 30 metres (98 ft)
- Height: 125 metres (410 ft)
- Longest span: 318 metres (1,043 ft)
- No. of spans: 4
- Piers in water: 3
- Load limit: 53,000+ tonnes
- Clearance below: 25 metres (82 ft)
- No. of lanes: 6

History
- Architect: Knight Architects
- Engineering design by: COWI & FHECOR
- Constructed by: Merseylink CCJV –: Kier Infrastructure and Overseas; FCC Construccion; Samsung C&T ECUK Consortium
- Construction start: May 2014; 12 years ago
- Construction end: October 2017; 8 years ago
- Construction cost: £600 million
- Opened: 14 October 2017; 8 years ago
- Inaugurated: 14 June 2018; 8 years ago

Statistics
- Toll: Motorcycles free; Cars £2.40; Goods vehicles 3.5–12 t £7.20; Goods vehicles over 12 t £9.60

Location
- Interactive map of Mersey Gateway Bridge

Location of the bridge in Cheshire

The Mersey Gateway Bridge is a toll bridge between Runcorn and Widnes in Cheshire, England, which spans the River Mersey and the Manchester Ship Canal. The crossing, which opened in October 2017, has three traffic lanes in each direction and is approximately 1.5 km (1 mile) east (upstream) of the older Silver Jubilee Bridge. It has a span of 998 m (3,274 ft) and a total length of 2.3 km (1.4 miles) including its approach roads. It formed part of a wider project to upgrade the infrastructure around the Mersey crossings that included major civil engineering work to realign the road network, refurbish and add tolling to the Silver Jubilee Bridge, and build new interchanges.

== Background ==
When the first road bridge between Runcorn and Widnes opened in 1961 (renamed the Silver Jubilee Bridge in 1977), it replaced the Widnes–Runcorn Transporter Bridge, a 19th-century steam-powered cable-truss transporter that carried four cars in 2½ minutes across the Mersey. The replacement crossing was designed to carry 8,000 vehicles per day; however, 50 years later more than 80,000 vehicles were using the through arch bridge and surrounding road network daily, ten times its expected capacity. A new crossing was therefore deemed both vital and necessary by Halton Borough Council. Moreover, it believed "better connectivity, more consistent journey times and improved accessibility, combined with a much improved physical urban environment would make Halton a better place to live and work, and [..] invest".

In 2001, Ramboll was appointed the lead technical consultant on the project. It worked as part of a technical advisor team composed of CH2M, Ramboll, IBI and Knight Architects, to support the Mersey Gateway Crossings Board with the technical and contractual administration of the project and to help it fulfil its contractual obligations.

In June 2010, the project was put on hold awaiting the outcome of the Treasury's 2010 spending review. In October 2010, it was confirmed by Chancellor George Osborne that the £431 million plan would go ahead. As part of the 2014 Budget, Osborne announced a £270 million guarantee for the project.

== Design and construction ==
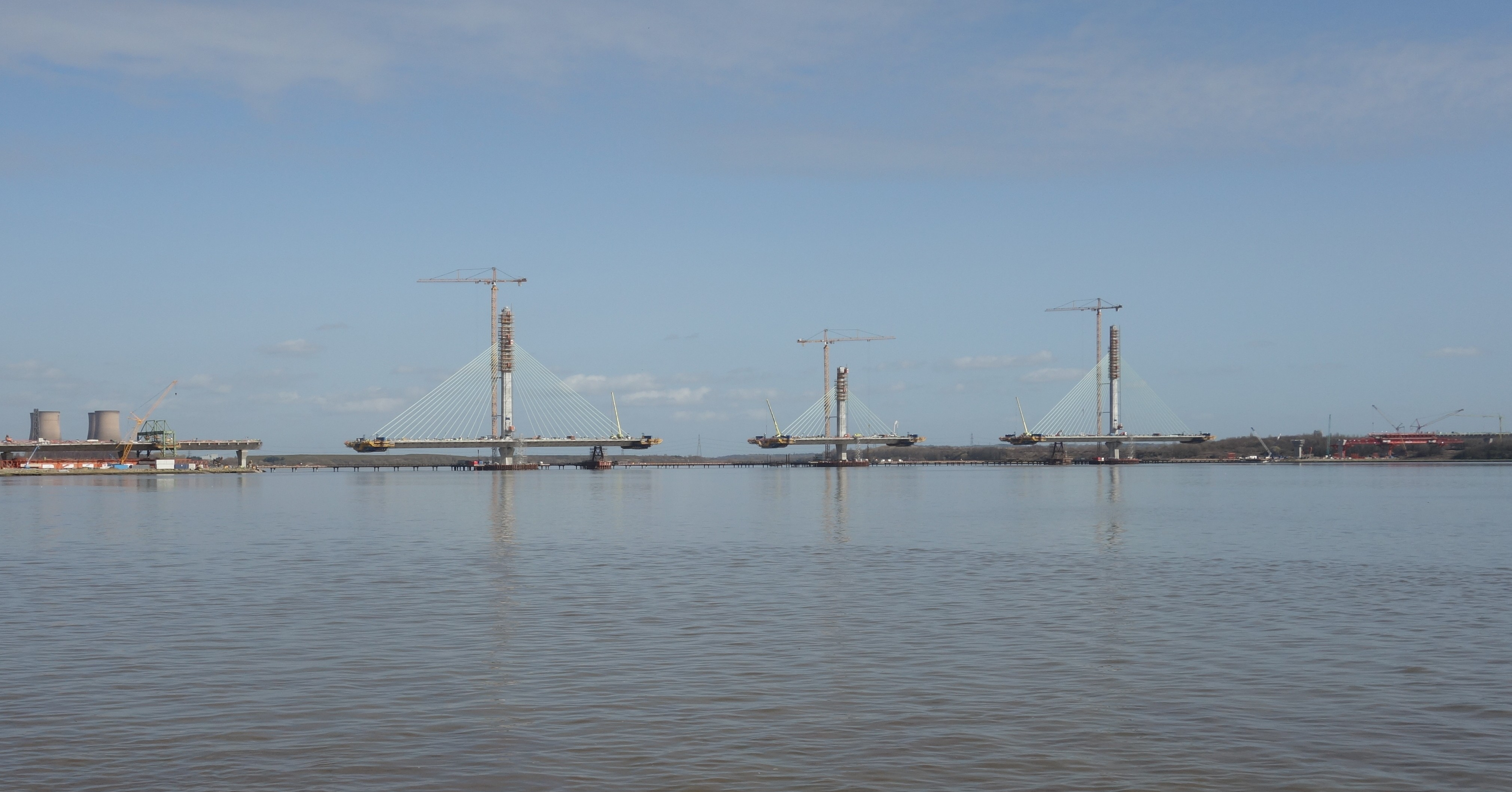
The bridge under construction

After extensive site preparation, construction work began on 7 May 2014. The bridge opened to traffic just after midnight on 14 October 2017.

The bridge has three single arranged towers that support harp design rigging. The three towers are different heights: an 80 m (260 ft) central pylon, a 110 m (360 ft) pylon on the north side and a 125 m (410 ft) south pylon.

The total cable-stayed span is 998 m (3,274 ft), made up of two main spans of 318 m (1,043 ft) and 294 metres (965 ft), and two side spans of 205 metres (673 ft) and 181 m (594 ft). The crossing's total length, including approach viaducts, is 2.3 km (1.4 miles). The deck is made from reinforced concrete with a maximum clearance of 23 m (75 ft) above the river. As the water depth was too low at this point for marine construction vessels, a 1.5 km (1-mile) trestle was built out into the Mersey to drive in the bridge's pilings.

New roads were built to connect the bridge to the highway network. An interchange and a junction were built to join the southern end to Runcorn's existing Central Expressway. On the northern side, the old route of the A562 was demolished and replaced with a dual carriageway to Speke Road. Embankments on the Widnes side were constructed from decontaminated material excavated along the route from former industrial brownfield sites: treating and reusing the material meant that it did not need to be removed from the construction zone. The new crossing was expected to improve journey times by up to ten minutes during peak times compared to the old bridge.

A 28.5-hectare (70-acre) nature reserve was established around the bridge and the surrounding riverside, managed by the Mersey Gateway Environmental Trust, an independent charity tasked with promoting biodiversity, landscape, science, and educational opportunities. This scheme, which will help conserve important ecological sites such as the Astmoor salt marshes, is part of the 1,600-hectare (4,000-acre) Upper Mersey Estuary project that covers everything upstream of the Mersey Gateway Bridge as far as Warrington.

== Tolls and charges ==
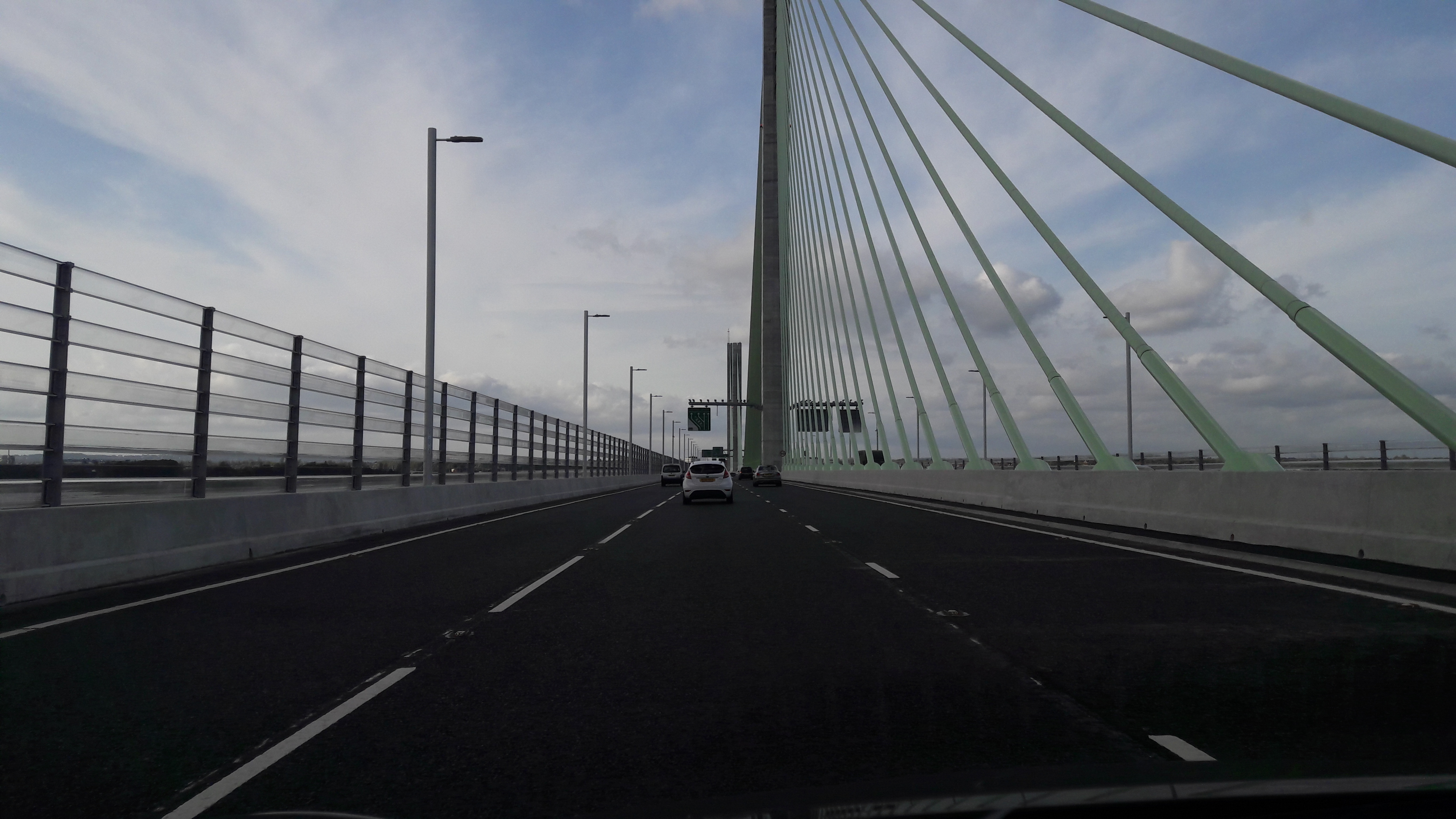
Driving north on the Mersey Gateway

As of April 2025, the fee for an unregistered car to cross the Mersey Gateway is £2.40; for a van or small lorry the single charge is £7.20 and for a larger lorry or bus £9.60. Local buses and motorcycles are exempt from the tolls. There are no toll booths for payment at the bridge. The toll must be paid to Merseyflow online or via telephone before midnight on the day following the crossing, or a penalty charge will be issued. Users can register online for a prepayment account negating the need to pay tolls individually: this also gives a 10% discount on the toll. Halton residents can pay an annual £12 administration fee and make unlimited personal trips at no further cost. The Merseyflow scheme is operated by emovis Operations Mersey on behalf of Halton Borough Council.

Halton Borough Council stated that the Silver Jubilee Bridge – although previously free to use – would be tolled like the Mersey Gateway bridge on completion of the scheme. The old bridge was reduced to one lane in each direction for vehicles and the remaining carriageways were converted to a pedestrian/cycleway. The local authority said the cost of the bridge is expected to be paid off in 25 years, at which point a review on tolls would be conducted. In 2019, a Merseyflow app was launched to help those not registered to pay for crossings.

=== Penalty charges ===
The toll must be paid before midnight the following day or a penalty charge is issued. The penalty charge for an unpaid crossing is £25 plus the unpaid toll. Unpaid penalty charges increase over time and are registered as a civil debt, recovery action begins and enforcement agents may be instructed. Compliance has improved as the Merseyflow app has allowed pre-payment options for customers. Between July and September 2021, over 97% of bridge users were recorded as paying their tolls on time.

=== Vehicle breakdown charges ===
If a vehicle has a breakdown whilst on the bridge, recovery is only permitted by a designated authorised company. No roadside repairs, refuelling or tyre changing are permitted unless by special permission. The recovered vehicle will be taken to an appropriate place where it will be impounded until the recovery and storage fees are paid. Fees for a breakdown recover are between £192 and £448 depending on vehicle size and type.

== Mersey Gateway Project ==
The construction of the bridge has led to wider infrastructure changes. The Silver Jubilee Bridge was closed upon the Gateway's opening and was re-opened in February 2021 after repair and conversion into a toll bridge, also having improved access for pedestrians and cyclists.

=== Runcorn Station Quarter ===
The Silver Jubilee Bridge, when re-opened, was delinked from the ring road preventing passage to Liverpool from the A533. Halton Council has plans to redevelop Runcorn railway station to promote railway journeys between Runcorn and Liverpool. A new "Station Quarter" with retail and leisure opportunities is envisioned on the land reclaimed from the road closure.

== Criticism ==
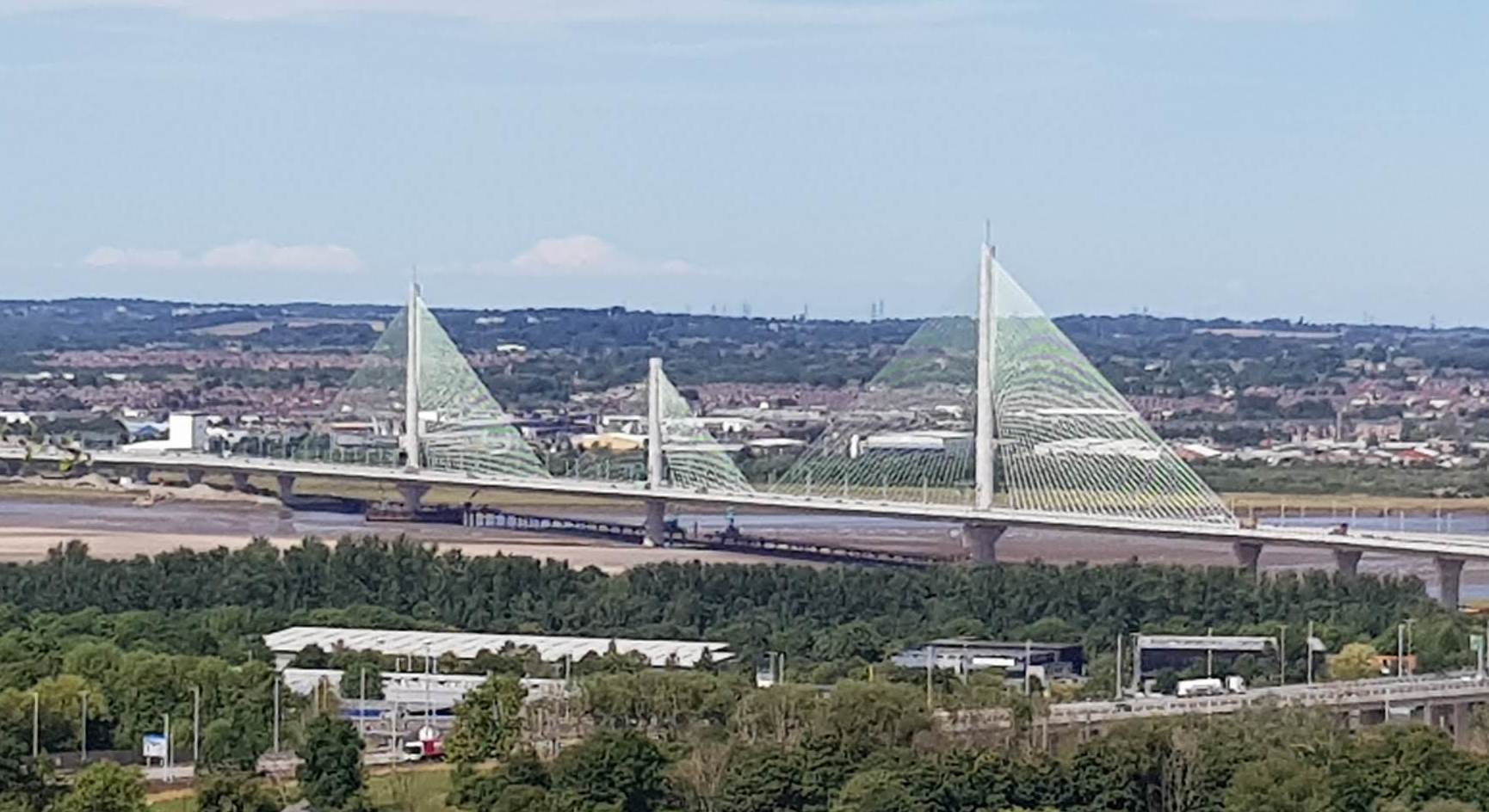
The central portion of the bridge

There has been a mixed response to the new Mersey crossing, with some people welcoming the new bridge but many bemoaning the costs. Protests were staged; opposing the decision to implement tolls on both crossings before the new bridge opened. Campaigners believe the extra transport costs will have a detrimental effect on the area and its economy. Taxi drivers have complained that the toll will prove unpopular with their customers, because it will mean fare rises. In the first month of opening, more than 50,000 drivers received a penalty charge notice (PCN). Some claimed to be unaware of how to pay the toll, since no signage of how to pay was evident, nor a telephone number supplied to pay the toll. One driver who repeatedly used the bridge without paying the toll received 28 PCNs; totalling £616. After claims that Merseyflow was in breach of both the Consumer Rights Act 2015 and Consumer Protection from Unfair Trading Regulations 2008, their PCNs were quashed on appeal in favour of a payment of £56 for the crossings made.

On 10 April 2018 it was announced that the outcome of an appeal against penalty charges heard by the Traffic Penalty Tribunal had concluded that the establishment of tolls and charges had not been properly implemented, as the council had failed to correctly follow the required commencement processes, and failed to properly specify the charges for use. The council's appeal was turned down, leading to annulment of charge notices in the period that the signage onto the bridge didn't comply with stated regulations.

During the COVID-19 lockdown period in 2020, an application by Halton Borough Council to suspend tolling operations was made to support key workers. This was rejected by the Department for Transport despite the broad support of local MPs in March and again in April 2020.
