= Hall of Fame Bridge =

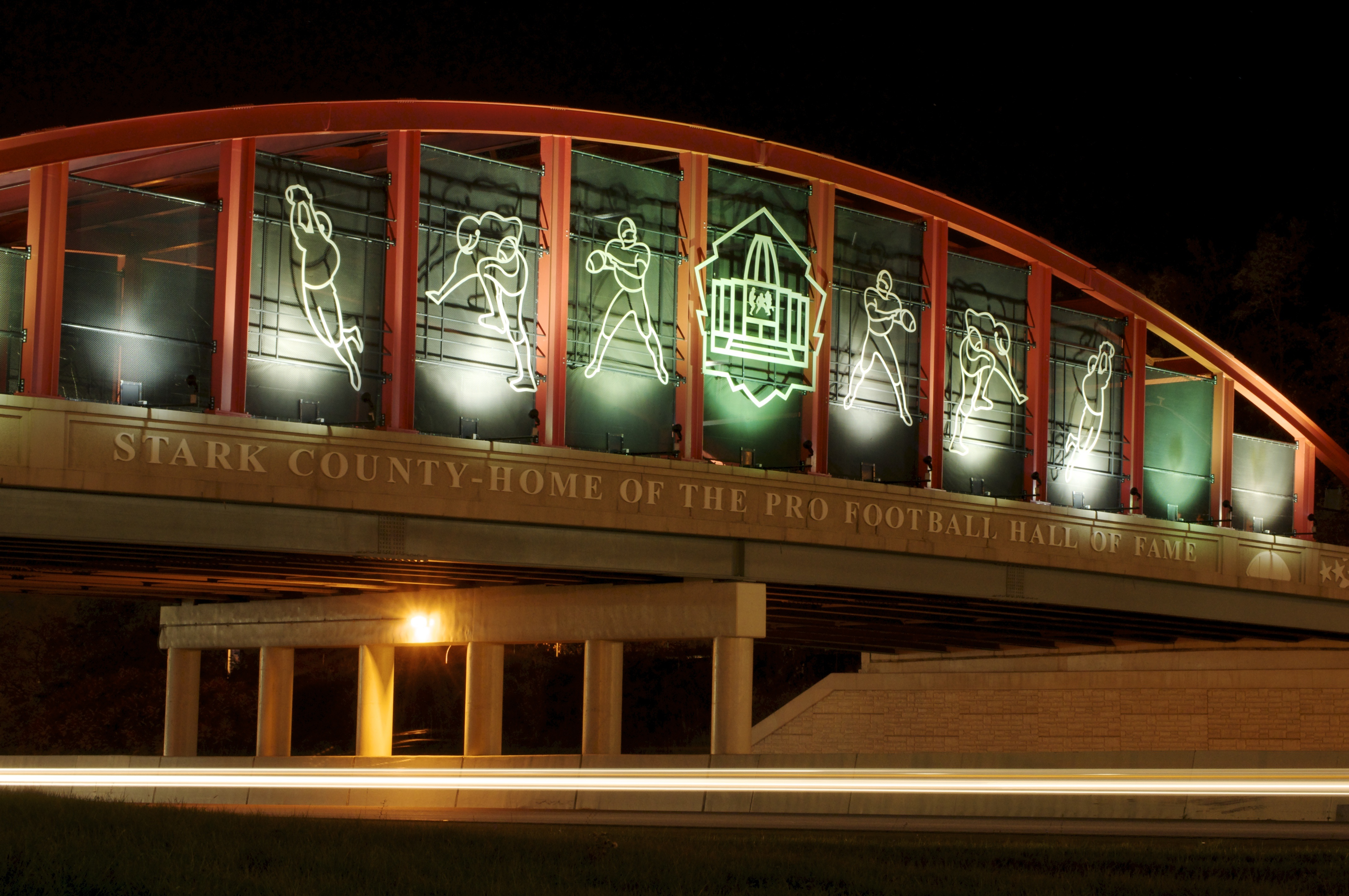
- The bridge at night
- Coordinates: 40°52′11″N 81°25′49″W
- Carries: 5 lanes of vehicle traffic
- Crosses: I-77
- Locale: Jackson Twp. Stark County, Ohio, United States

Characteristics
- Design: Through Arch

History
- Designer: Hammontree & Associates, Limited
- Construction end: 2006

The Hall of Fame Bridge is a through arch bridge over Interstate 77 (I-77) in the American city of Canton, Ohio. The bridge was dedicated on June 19, 2006, 6 years after the initial concept was imagined. The landmark bridge was built to complement the Pro Football Hall of Fame located just South of the bridge. Designed by WRL Advertising, the project was unveiled in May 2004 by Hall of Fame president, John Bankert and Stark County Engineer Mike Rehfus. Funding for the $2.2 million bridge came from the Stark County Engineers office and the Pro Football Hall of Fame. The hall of fame paid approximately one third of the cost to cover the aesthetic portion of the bridge, including the hall of fame logo and football players.
