= John Webster (engineer) =

English civil engineer

John James Webster (9 June 1845 – 1914) was an English civil engineer who specialised in designing bridges.

He was born in Warrington, Lancashire and educated at Owens College, Manchester. He trained with Bellhouse & Co of Manchester, where he became chief draughtsman. (Note: At that time Warrington was in the historical county of Lancashire; it is now in the ceremonial county of Cheshire.)

In 1871 he moved to Ashbury Carriage & Iron Co, where he designed several bridges in India, which led to his appointment as Chief of the Bridge Department of Messrs Thos. Brassey & Co., for whom he was responsible for the construction of the Liverpool landing-stage. In 1876 he worked for a short time as assistant engineer to the Aberdeen Harbour Works before joining the Hull Dock Company as assistant engineer.

In 1881 he set up in business as a consultant, firstly in Liverpool and then in London. Some of his more notable structures included:

- the reconstruction of the Conway Suspension Bridge
- Portsmouth bascule bridge
- Littlehampton swing bridge
- Widnes-Runcorn Transporter Bridge
- Shepherd's Bush Stadium for the Olympic Games of 1908
- Big Wheel at Earl's Court
- piers at Dover, Bangor, Minehead, Llandudno, Penmaenmawr, Menai Bridge, and Egremont

He was a member of the Institution of Civil Engineers and was awarded their Telford Gold Medal. His last work was Warrington Bridge at Bridgefoot which was one of the earliest examples of a reinforced concrete bridge.

He died at 81 Mount Nod Road, in Streatham on 30 October 1914 and was buried at West Norwood Cemetery.

== References and notes ==
Notes

Citations
