= Silver Jubilee Bridge =

Bridge in northwest England

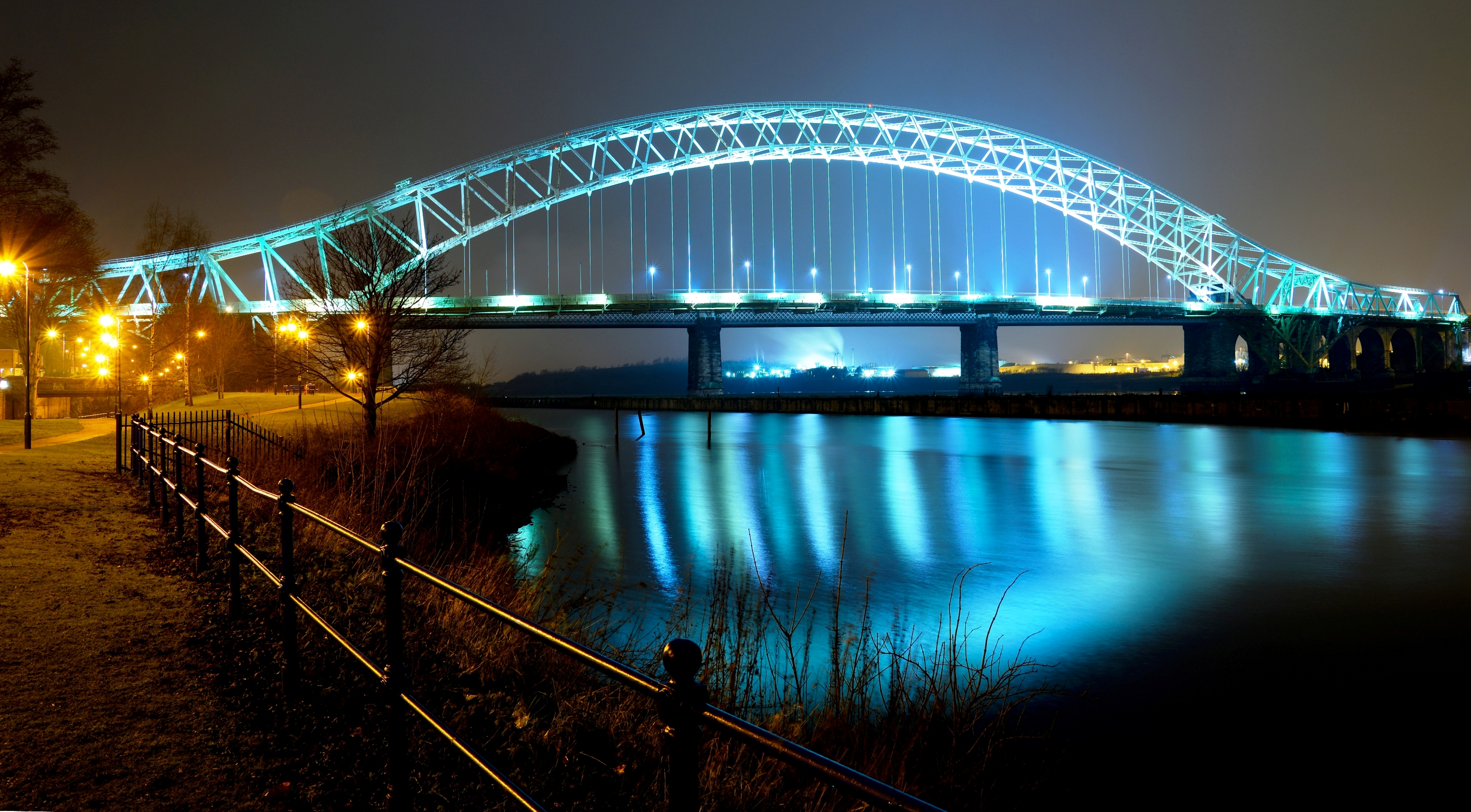
- The bridge as seen at night
- Coordinates: 53.3466°N 2.7377°W
- Carries: Road traffic and pedestrians
- Crosses: River Mersey; Manchester Ship Canal
- Locale: Runcorn Gap between Runcorn and Widnes
- Official name: Silver Jubilee Bridge
- Other name(s): Runcorn Bridge, Runcorn–Widnes Bridge, The Old Bridge
- Maintained by: Halton Borough Council

Characteristics
- Design: Through arch bridge
- Material: Steel
- Total length: 527 yards (482 m)
- Width: 18 yards (16 m)
- Height: 285 feet (87 m)
- Longest span: 361 yards (330 m)
- No. of spans: 1
- Clearance below: 80 feet (24 m) over the Manchester Ship Canal

History
- Designer: Mott, Hay and Anderson
- Construction start: 25 April 1956; 70 years ago
- Opened: 21 July 1961; 65 years ago

Statistics
- Toll: Free for Motorcycles; £2.40 Cars and Vans; £7.20 Vehicles up to 12t; £9.60 Vehicles over 12t

Listed Building – Grade II
- Designated: 29 March 1988
- Reference no.: 1130421

Location
- Interactive map of Silver Jubilee Bridge

The Silver Jubilee Bridge (originally the Runcorn–Widnes Bridge or informally the Runcorn Bridge or Locally The Old Bridge) crosses the River Mersey and the Manchester Ship Canal at Runcorn Gap between Runcorn and Widnes in Halton, England. It is a through arch bridge with a main arch span of 361 yards (330 m). It was opened in 1961 as a replacement for the Widnes–Runcorn Transporter Bridge. In 1975–77 the carriageway was widened, after which the bridge was given its official name in honour of the Silver Jubilee of Elizabeth II. It carries the A533 road and a cantilevered footway. The bridge is recorded in the National Heritage List for England as a designated Grade II listed building. The bridge was closed to vehicles for refurbishment upon the opening of the new Mersey Gateway Bridge, but reopened as a toll bridge in February 2021.

== History ==
=== Before construction ===
Until 1868, when Runcorn Railway Bridge was opened, (Note: Differing dates have been given for the date of opening. Building of the bridge was completed in 1868 and on 21 May there was an introductory opening when a short train crossed the bridge. It was formally opened for traffic on 10 October but the first goods traffic did not cross it until 1 February 1869.) the only means of crossing the Mersey at or near Runcorn Gap were by fording or by ferry, with the lowest crossing of the river being the road bridge at Warrington. The first bridge to carry vehicular traffic across Runcorn Gap was the Widnes-Runcorn Transporter Bridge which opened in 1905. This was an inefficient means of transport and it had become inadequate for the amount of traffic using it before the outbreak of World War II. In 1946 the Ministry of Transport agreed that the transporter bridge should be replaced when sufficient funds were available. Mott, Hay and Anderson were appointed as consultant engineers.

=== Planning ===
The new bridge had to allow the passage of shipping along the Manchester Ship Canal. Many ideas were considered, including a new transporter bridge or a swing bridge. These were considered to be impractical and it was decided that the best solution was a high-level bridge upstream from the railway bridge. This would allow the least obstruction to shipping and would also be at the narrowest crossing point. The first plan for a high-level bridge was a truss bridge with three or five spans, giving an 8 yards (7 m) dual carriageway with a cycle track and footpaths. This was abandoned because it was too expensive, and because one of the piers would be too close to the wall of the ship canal. The next idea was for a suspension bridge with a span of 343 yards (314 m) between the main towers with an 8 yards (7 m) single carriageway and a 2-yard (2 m) footpath. However aerodynamic tests on models of the bridge showed that, while the bridge itself would be stable, the presence of the adjacent railway bridge would cause severe oscillation.

The finally accepted design was for a steel through arch bridge with a 10-yard (9 m) single carriageway. The design of the bridge is similar to that of Sydney Harbour Bridge but differs from it in that the side spans are continuous with the main span rather than being separate from them. This design feature was necessary to avoid the problem of oscillation due to the railway bridge. The main span measures 361 yards (330 m) and each side span is 83 yards (76 m).

=== Construction ===
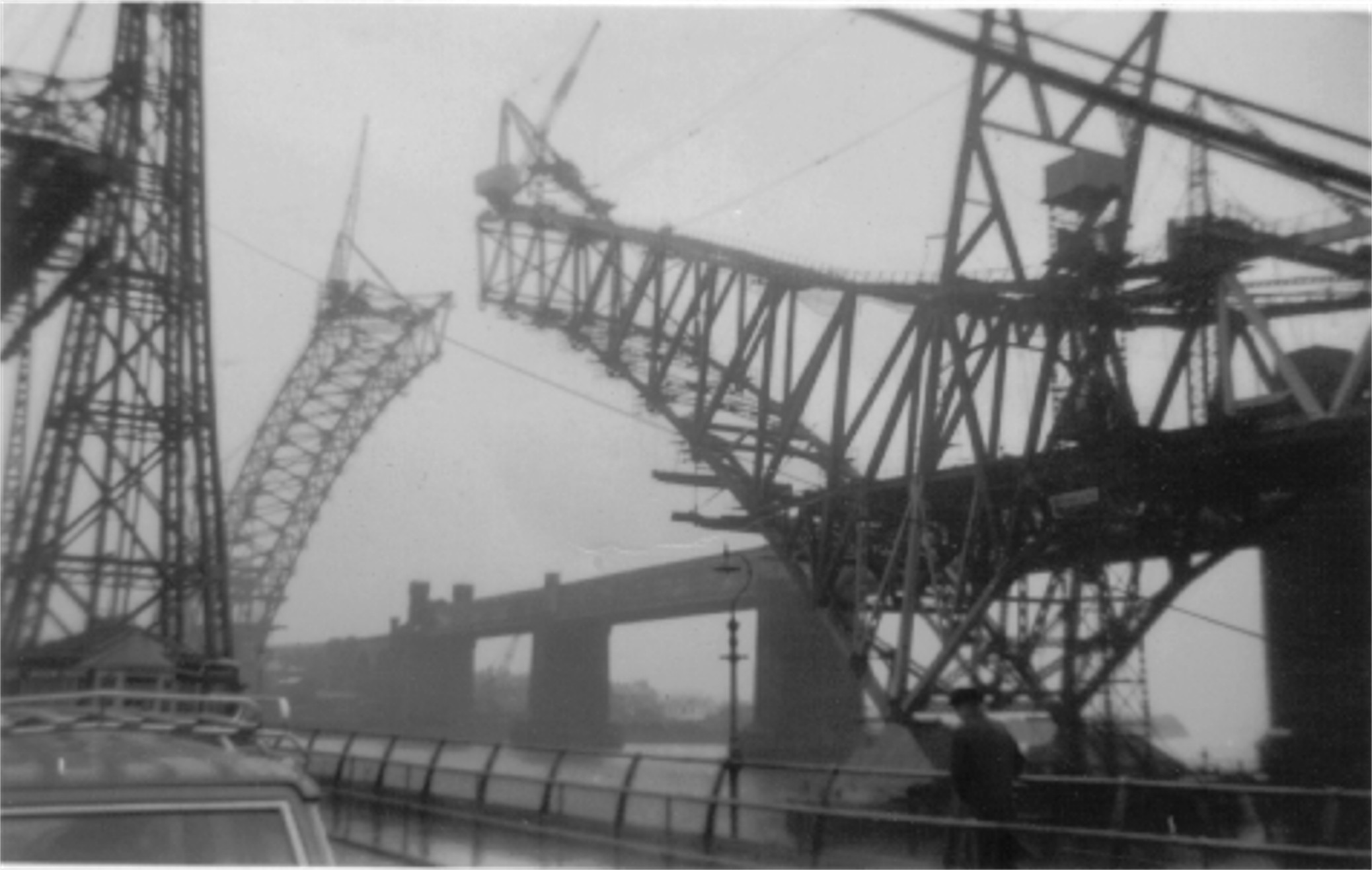
The Runcorn-Widnes Bridge under construction

Construction began on 25 April 1956. The contractors for the first phase of work, Leonard Fairclough of Adlington, cleared the ground and constructed the foundations for the piers. The contract for the second phase, the building of the main arch and the side arches, was given to Dorman Long of Middlesbrough who sub-contracted the building of the bridge deck, viaduct and roadworks to Leonard Fairclough. Building of the bridge itself began in March 1958 and the side spans were completed by November 1959. The main arch was built by cantilevering steelwork from the side spans until it met in the middle in November 1960. The carriageway was suspended from the arch by 48 lock-coil wire ropes. From February 1960, approach roads and viaducts were being built on both sides of the river; the total length of viaduct constructed was 525 yards (480 m). The approaches on the Runcorn side blocked the Bridgewater Canal at Waterloo Bridge and the line of locks leading down to the Mersey were filled in. The bridge was officially opened as the Runcorn-Widnes Bridge by Princess Alexandra on 21 July 1961. Since creation it has always been painted in a light shade of green.

== Structure, specifications and costs ==
The main arch is 361 yards (330 m) long and each side arch measures 83 yards (76 m). During its construction 720,000 rivets were used. Its height over the river bed is 285 feet (87 m) and the headroom over the ship canal is 80 feet (24 m). During its construction 5,900 tons of steel were used and 7,500 tons of concrete. The bridge requires constant repainting, with each coat using 6,000 imperial gallons (27,300 L) of paint. On the Runcorn side the approach viaducts are 359 yards (328 m) in length, and on the Widnes side 166 yards (152 m). The cost of constructing the bridge was £2,433,000. At the time of its construction it had the third longest steel arch span in the world. It had the longest vehicular span in the country, but this record was held for only a few weeks until the Tamar Bridge was completed. By 2001 it was the 10th longest steel arch bridge, and at that time was just 8 inches (20 cm) short of having Europe's largest span.

== Usage ==
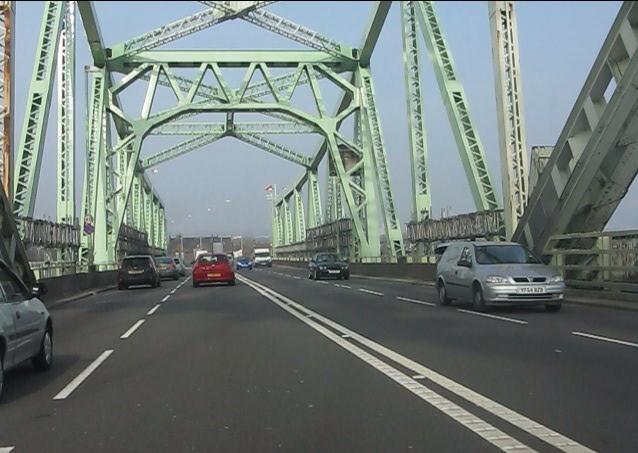
The bridge's four lanes from 1977-2017

The bridge transformed Runcorn from an effective cul-de-sac into a town with through traffic. Road communications between north Cheshire and south Lancashire were immediately improved. Trade at the Port of Runcorn increased sixfold between 1960 and 1970. The presence of the bridge enabled the development of the New Town in Runcorn in the late 1960s and the 1970s. The amount of traffic using the bridge trebled between 1961 and 1970; this led to such severe congestion that in 1965 the first of two road widenings took place with a lane being added down the middle of the bridge (commonly referred to as the suicide lane). By 1975 traffic had increased to 40,000 vehicles per day and the bridge was widened again adding a fourth lane; the approach roads were improved creating a better flow on and off the bridge. The carriageway was widened by incorporating the footpaths, giving it four lanes, and a cantilevered foot-way was built on the east side of the bridge. This work was completed in 1977 and in that year the bridge was renamed from Runcorn Bridge to the Silver Jubilee Bridge to commemorate the Queen's Silver Jubilee. Since 1994 the bridge has been illuminated at night by floodlights. Repairs to chloride corrosion of the bridge's deck were carried out in the early 21st century using an innovative electrolytic method; they were shortlisted for the Prime Minister's Award for Better Public Building of 2010.

== Refurbishment ==
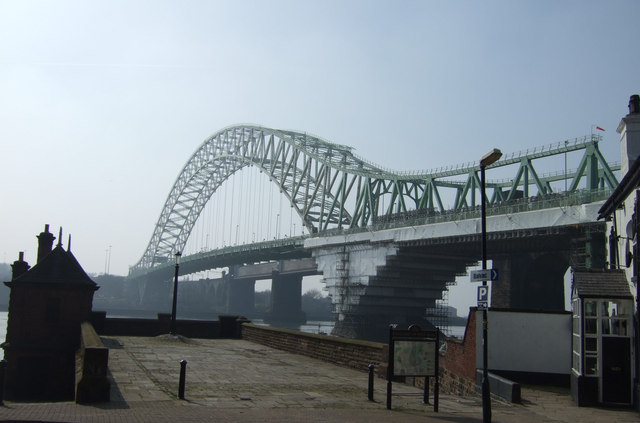
The bridge under maintenance in 2012

Traffic on the bridge continued to grow to over 80,000 vehicles a day, and there was frequent congestion. In order to alleviate this, a further crossing was built, known as the Mersey Gateway Bridge. This is a six-lane toll bridge to the east of the Silver Jubilee Bridge that opened on 14 October 2017. Following the opening of the Mersey Gateway, the Silver Jubilee bridge was immediately closed to vehicles for refurbishment, after which it reopened with tolls applied to both bridges. It reopened to all traffic on 26 February 2021 with a single lane of vehicle traffic in each direction and a new cycle and footpath. The road network on the Runcorn side of the bridge was reconfigured. The West Viaduct, also known as the "Trumpet Loop", was demolished and replaced with a roundabout, with the land recovered from the viaduct used for new leisure and retail space.

== In popular culture ==
The bridge has featured in several productions including the BBC drama Merseybeat, Netflix's Stay Close (2021), and has been used for the upcoming DC film The Batman: Part II, with the bridge doubling as a snowy Gotham City.

== See also ==
- Listed buildings in Runcorn (urban area)
- List of longest arch bridge spans

== Notes and references ==
Notes

Citations

Sources

- Anon. (1978), The Bridging of Runcorn Gap, Halton Borough Council
- Starkey, H. F. (1990), Old Runcorn, Halton: Halton Borough Council
- Thompson, Dave (2001), Bridging Us Together: The Story of Runcorn-Widnes Bridge, Widnes: Dave Thompson

Next crossing upstream	River Mersey	Next crossing downstream
Mersey Gateway Bridge	Silver Jubilee Bridge; Grid reference SJ5094383422	Runcorn Railway Bridge
