= Pol Sefid (Ahvaz) =

Bridge in Ahvaz, Iran

White Bridge پل سفید
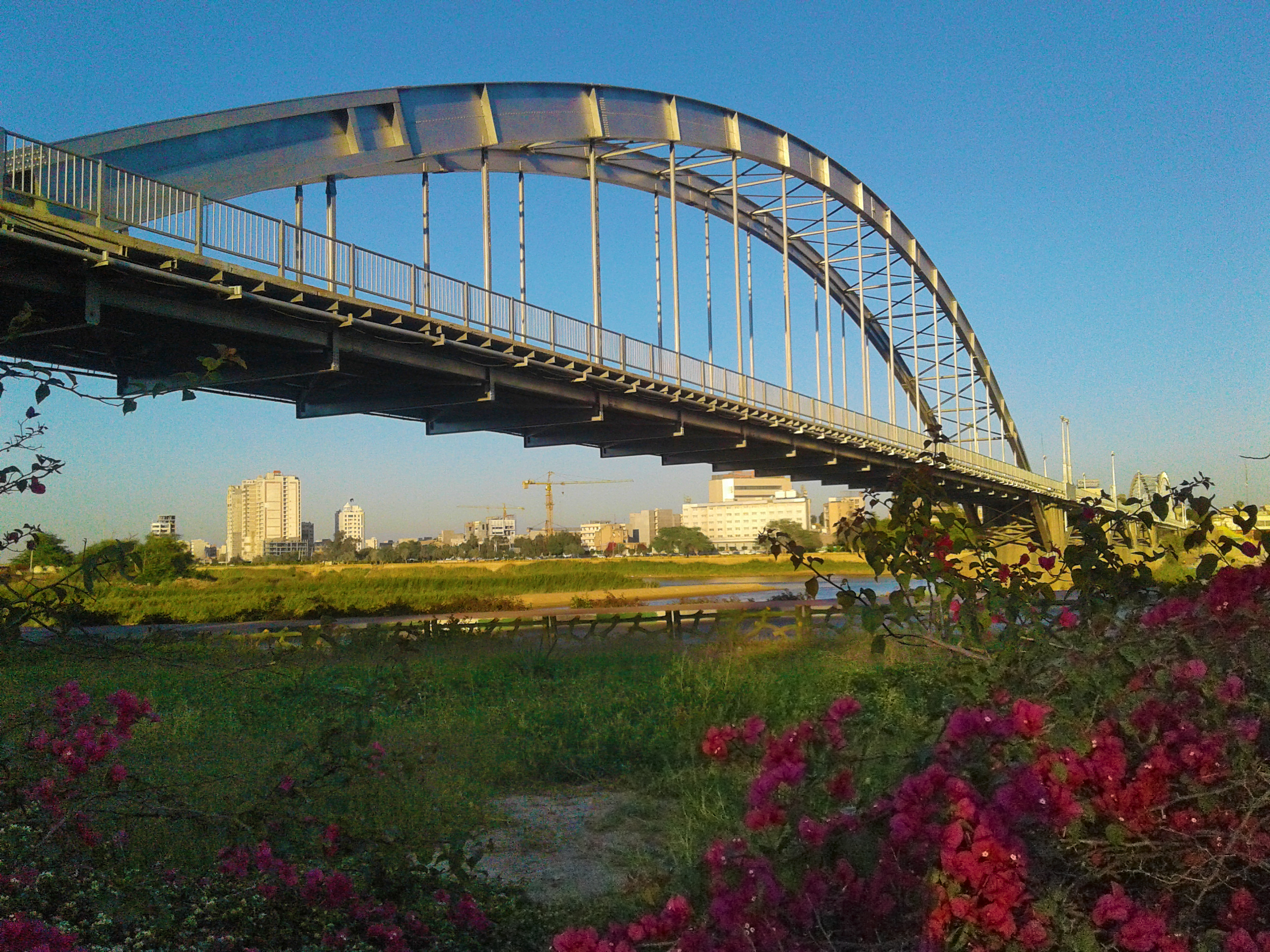
- Coordinates: 31.3196°N 48.6818°E
- Carries: Pedestrian and Automotive traffic
- Crosses: Karun River
- Locale: Ahvaz, Iran
- Official name: Ahvaz Bridge
- Other name: White Bridge

Characteristics
- Material: Concrete, Metal
- Total length: 1643 ft (501.2 m)
- Height: 42 ft (13 m)
- No. of lanes: 2

History
- Construction start: 21 October 1935
- Construction end: 21 September 1936
- Inaugurated: 6 November 1936

Location
- Interactive map of White Bridge

Pol Sefid (Persian: پل سفید) is an arch bridge located in Ahvaz, Khuzestan, Iran, built above the Karun river. The bridge was completed on 21 September 1936, and was inaugurated on 6 November 1936. The bridge remains a symbol of the city still today.

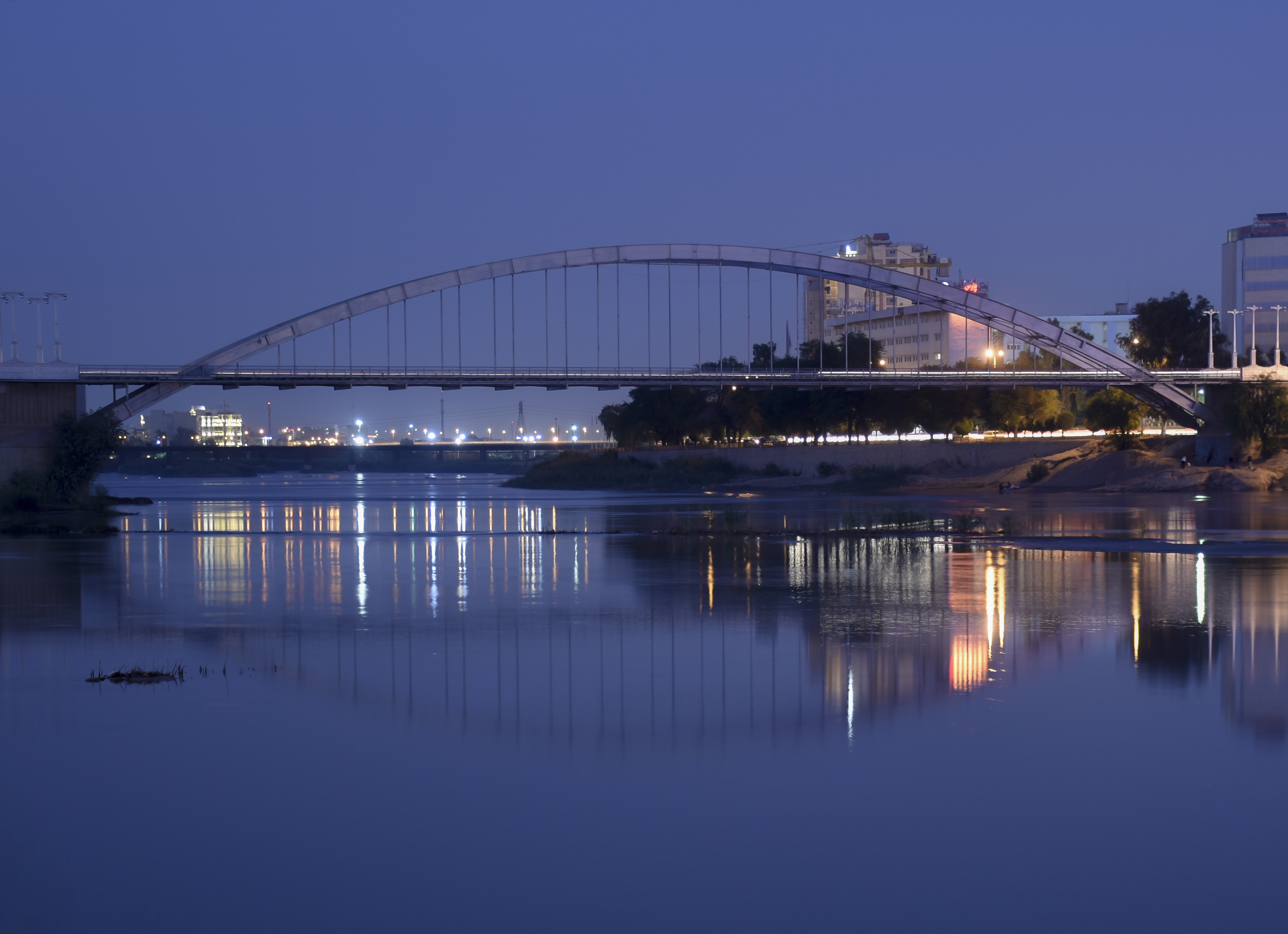
White bridge at night
