= Widnes–Runcorn Transporter Bridge =

Former bridge in northwest England

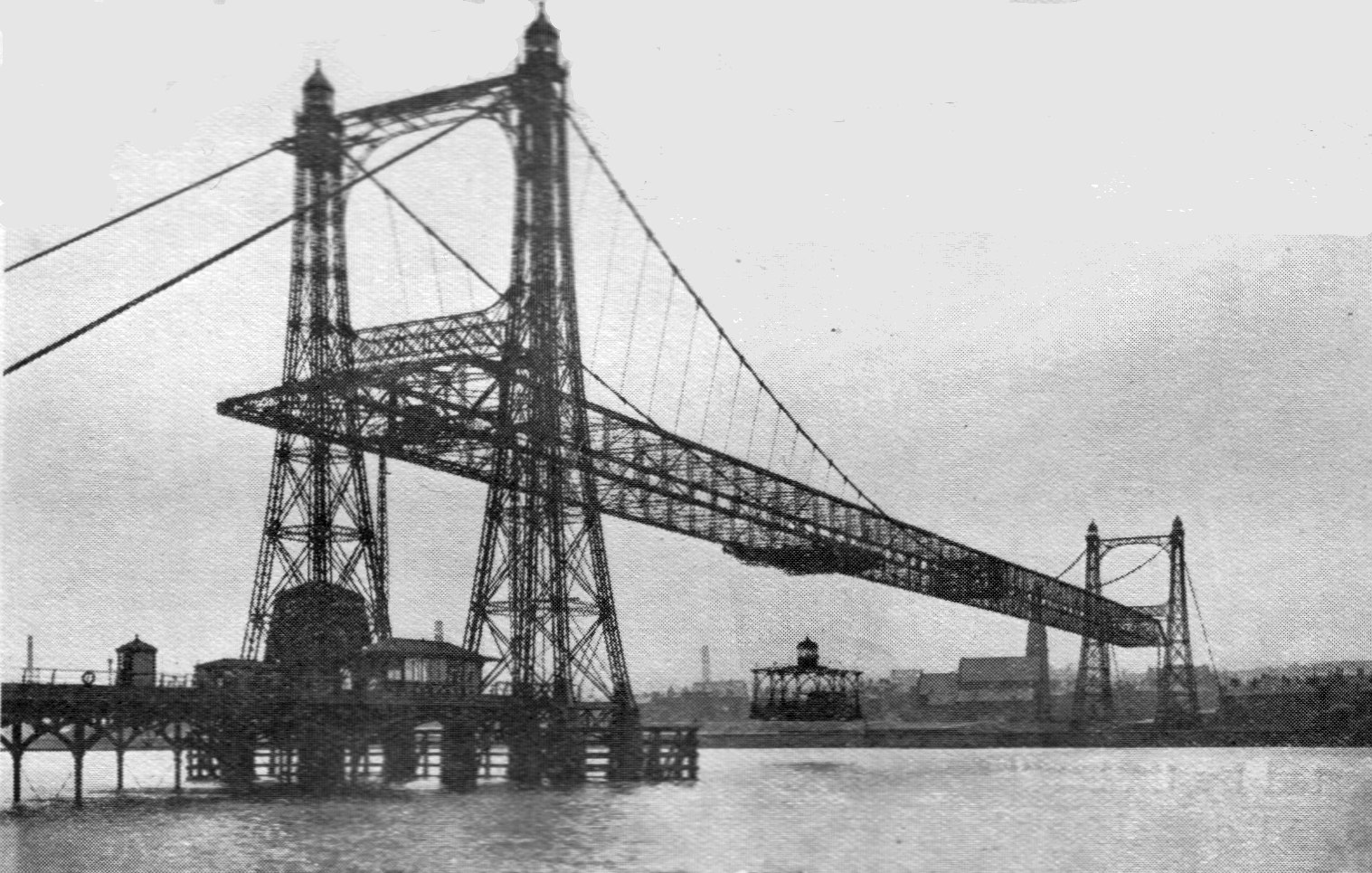
- Coordinates: 53.3466°N 2.7363°W
- Carries: Vehicles; Pedestrians
- Crosses: River Mersey; Manchester Ship Canal
- Locale: Widnes–Runcorn

Characteristics
- Design: Transporter bridge
- Longest span: 300 metres (1,000 ft)
- Clearance below: 25 metres (82 ft)

History
- Designer: John Webster
- Construction start: 1901; 125 years ago
- Opened: 1905; 121 years ago
- Closed: 1961; 65 years ago

Location
- Interactive map of Widnes–Runcorn Transporter Bridge

The Widnes–Runcorn Transporter Bridge crossed the River Mersey and Manchester Ship Canal linking the towns of Runcorn and Widnes. Completed in 1905, it was Britain's first transporter bridge and the largest of its type ever built in the world. It continued in use until 22 July 1961, when it was replaced by a through arch bridge, now known as the Silver Jubilee Bridge. The transporter bridge was then demolished.

== History ==
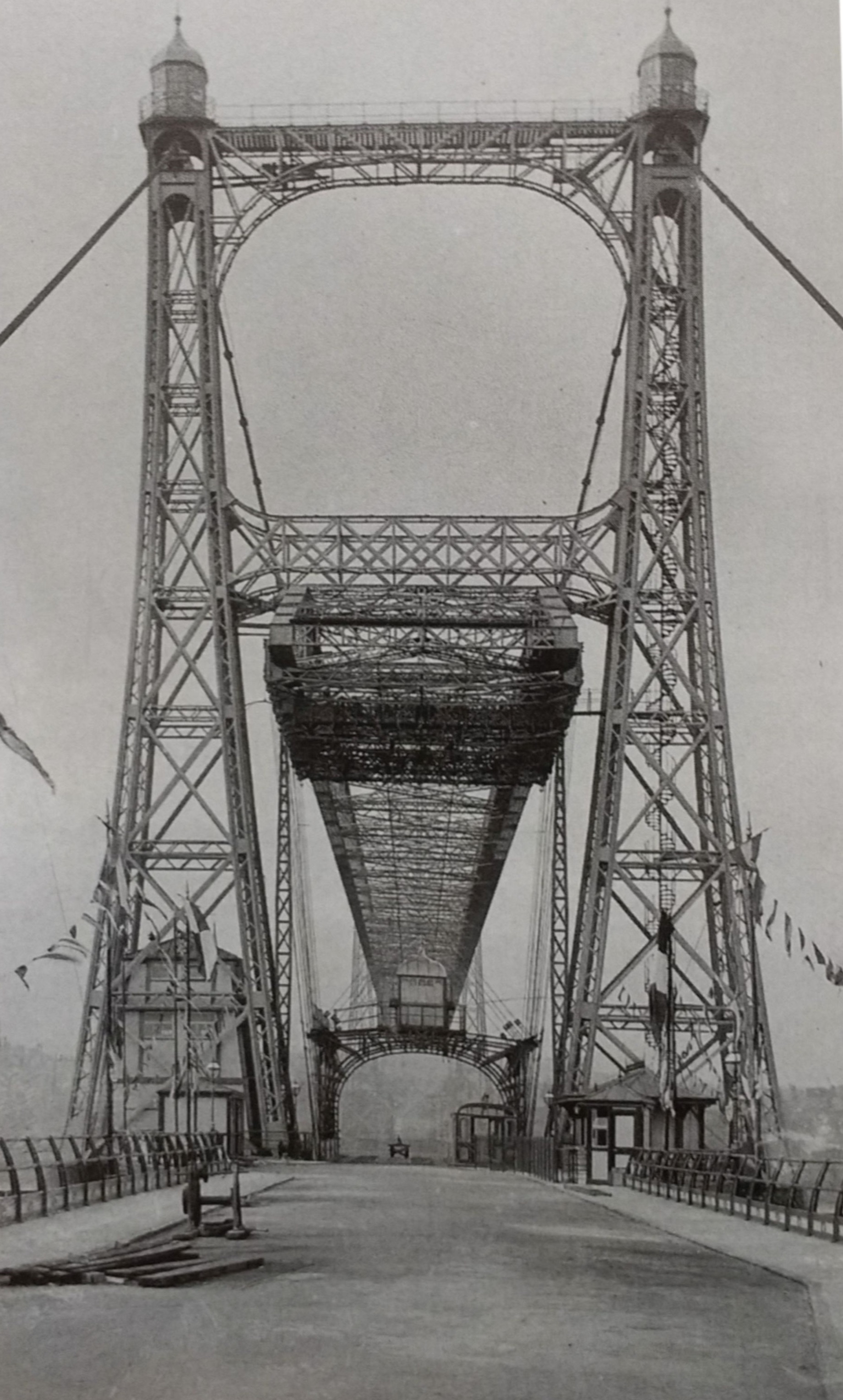
View along the bridge interior in 1905

At the beginning of the 20th century the only means of crossing the river Mersey at Runcorn Gap were by rail on the Runcorn Railway Bridge (which also had a footpath) or by using the ancient ferry (a rowing boat). In the 1890s the Manchester Ship Canal had been constructed and this meant that the journey by ferry had to be made in two stages, with a climb over the wall of the canal between the stages. A road bridge was clearly needed but it would have to pass high enough over the canal to allow the passage of ocean-going ships. The cost of doing this was felt to be prohibitive.

In 1899 the Widnes & Runcorn Bridge Company was established under the chairmanship of Sir John Brunner to investigate the options. Their decision was to build a transporter bridge. This would be cheaper than an orthodox type of bridge and the passage of the transporter car could be timed to allow the passage of the ships. The first transporter bridge in the world had been opened in 1893 in Bilbao, Spain. This had been followed in 1898 by transporter bridges in Rouen (France) and Bizerta (now Tunisia). Parliamentary approval had already been obtained for a transporter bridge over the River Usk at Newport, Monmouthshire. This was then followed by the construction of a transporter bridge in Middlesbrough over the River Tees in 1911.

Widnes and Runcorn Bridge Act 1900
- Act of Parliament
- Parliament of the United Kingdom
- Long title: An Act to authorise the construction of a bridge across the River Mersey and Manchester Ship Canal between Widnes and Runcorn and for other purposes.
- Citation: 63 & 64 Vict. c. lxxxvi

Dates
- Royal assent: 10 July 1900

The Widnes and Runcorn Bridge Act 1900 (63 & 64 Vict. c. lxxxvi) gave approval for the bridge, and the act also allowed for the formal ending of the ferry. It was designed by John Webster and John Wood. Construction began in December 1901 and was completed in 1905. The cost was £130,000 (equivalent to £17,630,000 in 2023). The transporter bridge was opened (in the absence of King Edward VII who was indisposed) by Sir John Brunner on 29 May 1905.

During the following years there were problems both with the functioning of the bridge and with its financing. The company could not make it pay and in 1911 it was sold to Widnes Corporation. Several improvements were made to the bridge over the years. In its later years it made 49,000 journeys annually, carrying 280,000 cars, 145,000 commercial vehicles and over 2 million passengers. However, it was inadequate for the growing needs of the region and its physical condition was deteriorating. A fixed high-level bridge was needed and this was eventually opened on 21 July 1961. The transporter bridge closed the following day and was later demolished.

== Structure ==
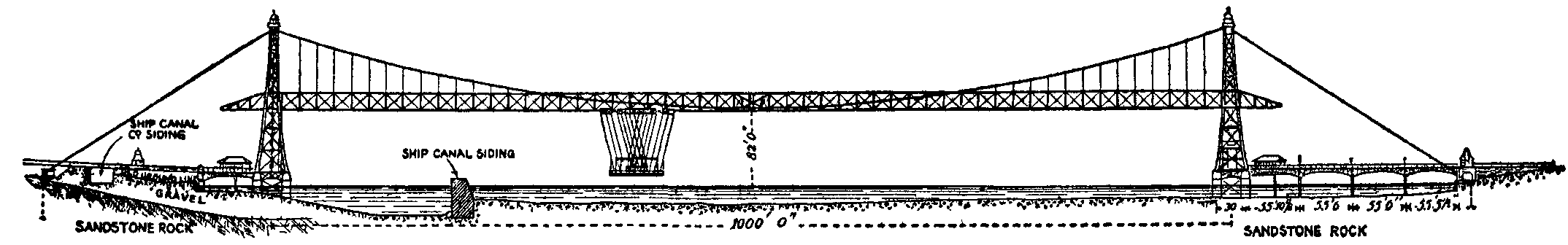
Drawing of the bridge showing span and transporter car

The two towers were 180 feet (55 m) high and the distance between them spanned by a truss was 1,000 feet (300 m). The weight of the cables suspending the girder was 250 tons. The underside of the girder was 82 feet (25 m) above the high water level. The transporter car was 55 feet (17 m) long and 24 feet 6 inches (7.5 m) wide and was designed to carry 4 two-horse farm waggons and 300 passengers. A shelter was provided for the passengers. The bottom of the car was 12 feet (3.7 m) above high water level and it cleared the ship canal wall by 4.5 feet (1.4 m). It was suspended from a moving trolley 77 feet (23 m) long. In conditions of reasonable weather and load the journey took 2.5 minutes. The driver was sited in a cabin on top of the car from which he had an uninterrupted view in all directions. An endless wire rope, pulled by a winch housed in the power house, provided the power to move the trolley across the River Mersey. The winch on the Widnes side pulled the trolley towards Widnes and Runcorn in turn. Approach roads of 320 feet (98 m) on the Widnes side and 470 feet (140 m) on the Runcorn side were built.

== Present day ==
The former approaches to the transporter bridge at the bottom of Waterloo Road, Runcorn, and Mersey Road, Widnes, can still be seen. On the Widnes side the power house remains and it has been designated as a Grade II* listed building by English Heritage. Transporter Building, the former office building, also remains nearby in Mersey Road.

== Gallery ==
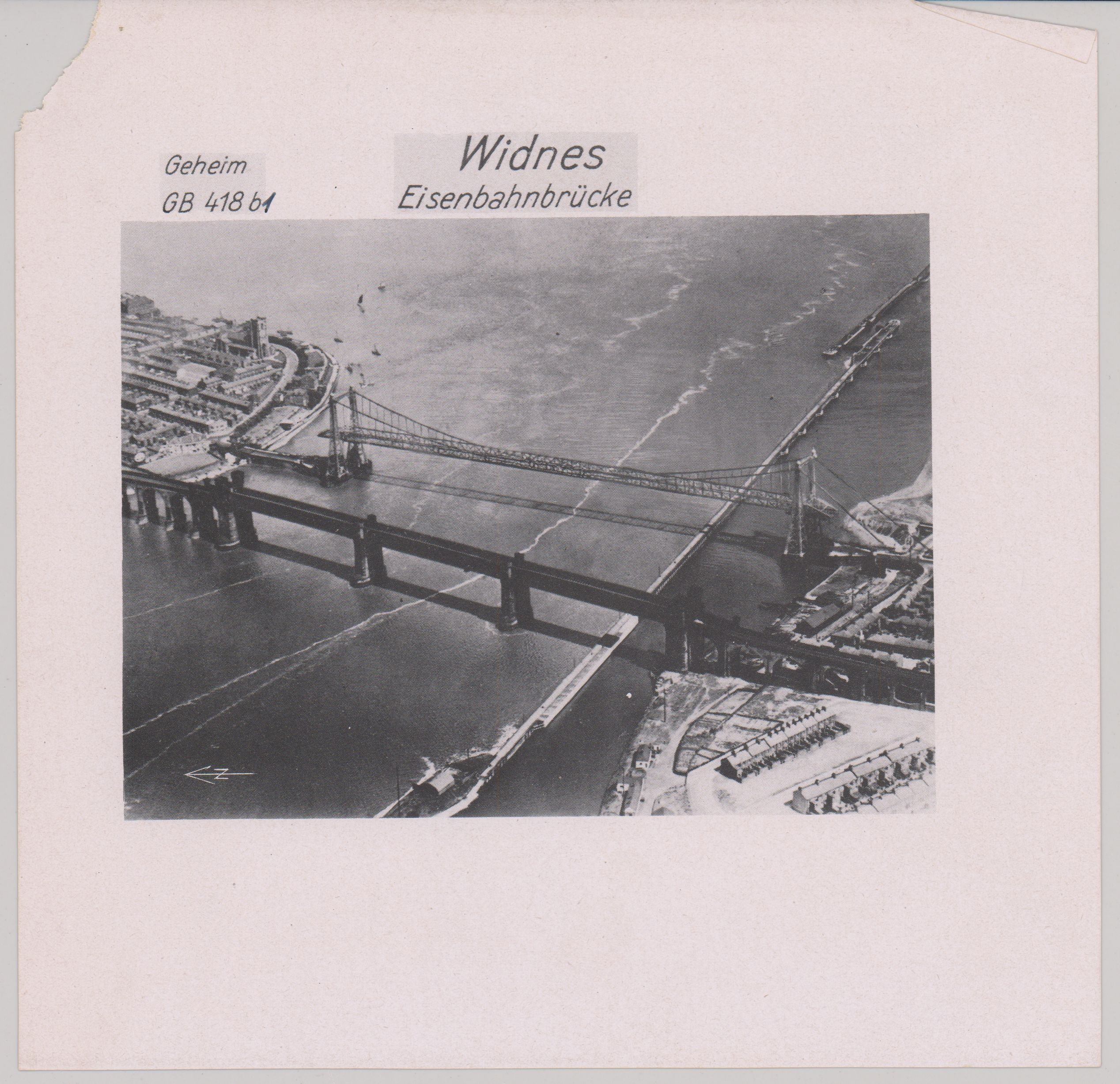
An aerial view of the transporter bridge and Runcorn Railway Bridge from a Luftwaffe bombing target dossier, 1939

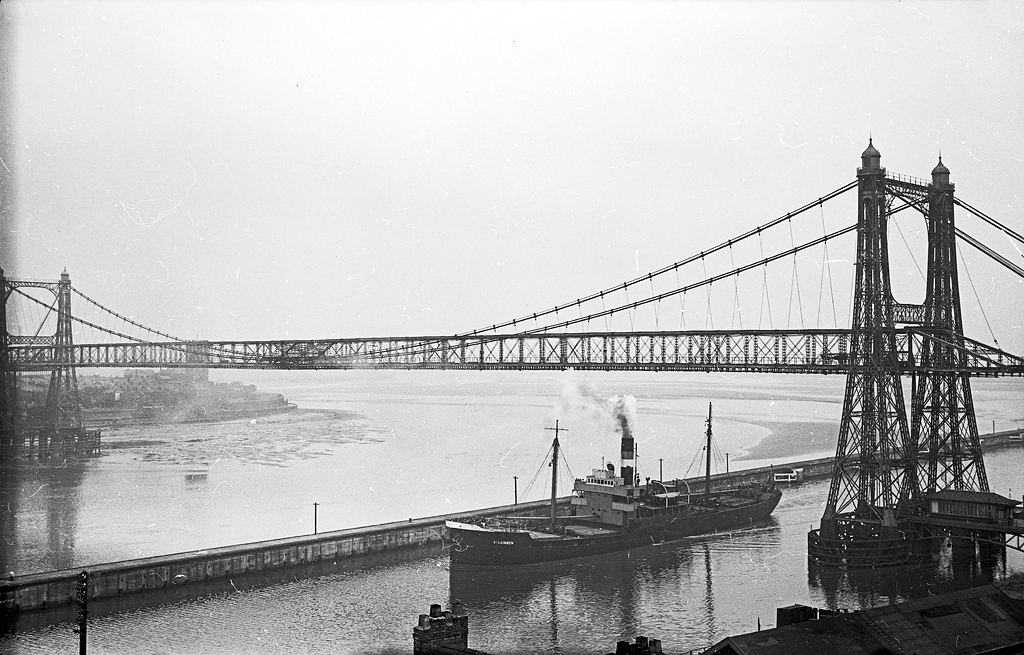
A ship passing under the bridge, c. 1952

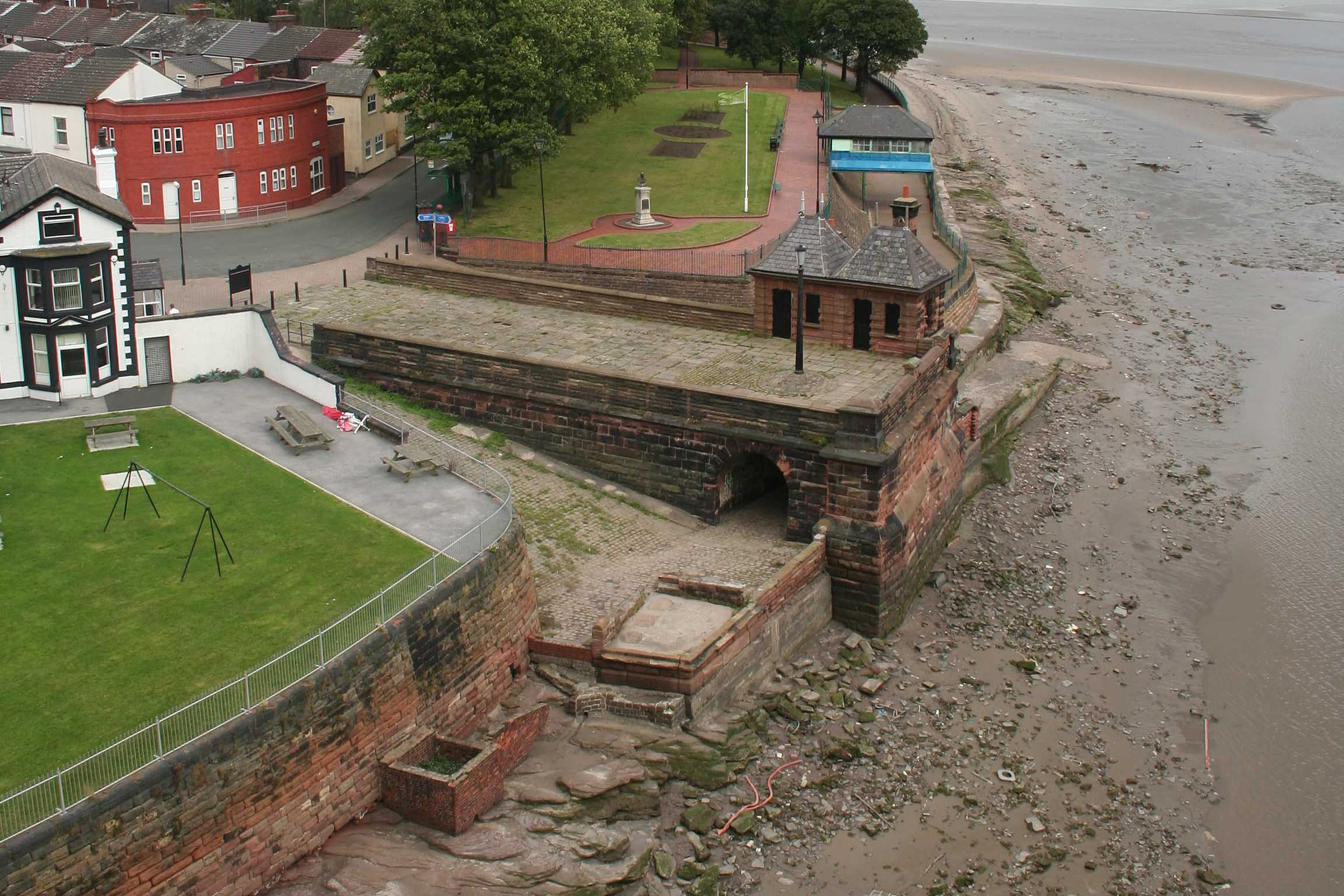
The power house and Widnes approach in 2009

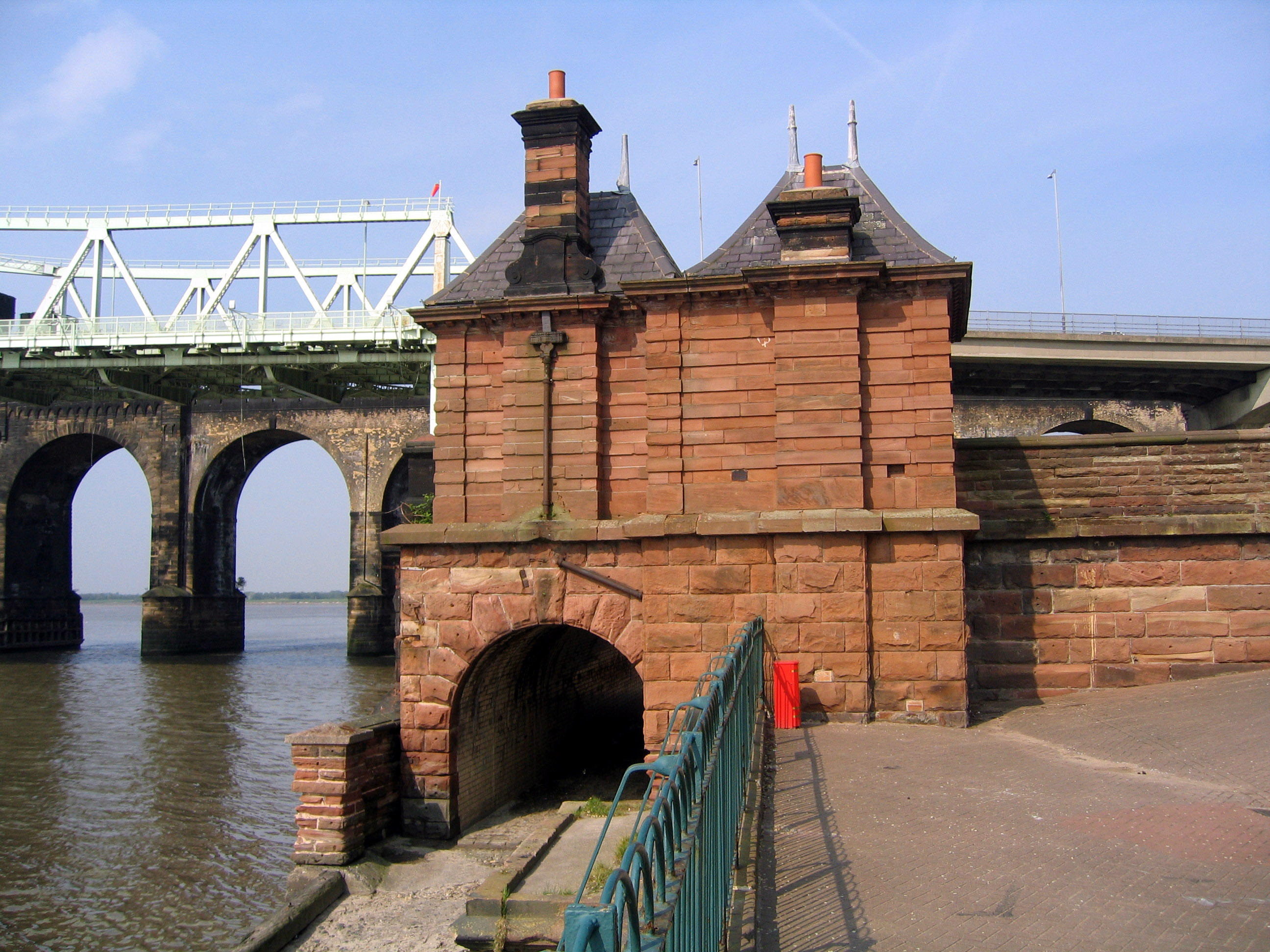
Former power house with the road and rail bridges visible beyond

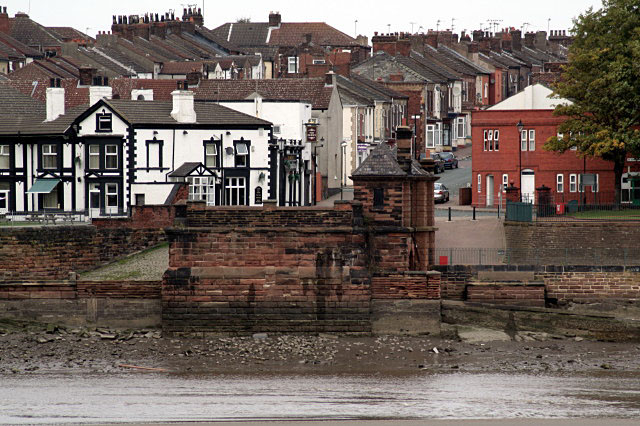
The toll house and pier on the Widnes side of the River Mersey
