= Louise Marie Richter =

- Born: Louise Marie Schwaab; 1852; Broussa, Turkey
- Died: January 9, 1938 (aged 85–86); Lugano, Switzerland
- Occupations: Art historian, translator, novelist
- Spouse: Jean Paul Richter (m. 1878)
- Children: Irma A. Richter, Gisela Richter

Louise Marie Richter (née Schwaab; 1852–1938) was a German art historian, translator and novelist. She was married to art historian Jean Paul Richter; their daughters, Irma and Gisela Richter were also notable art historians.

She was born in 1852 in Broussa, Turkey (which is now called Bursa). Her father, Henrique Schwaab (or Schwab), was a German silk manufacturer based in Broussa who served as both Austrian and American consul. She traveled extensively with her family as a child, much of it in Asia Minor.

On a trip to London with her sister when she was eighteen she met Jean Paul Richter, whom she married in 1878. She and her husband had two daughters, both of whom became art historians as well: Irma A. Richter, born in 1876, and Gisela M. A. Richter born in 1882.

The Richters became close friends with German-born industrialist, Ludwig Mond, through his wife Frida, and Frida's friend Henriette Hertz. In 1881, Hertz lived with the family in Notting Hill for several months and Jean Paul began tutoring her in art history. In 1883, during a stay at Mond's Norwich home, Louise Richter persuaded the newly-wealthy man to begin collecting art, and Jean Paul Richter began advising Mond on acquisitions. The impressive collection was bequeathed to the National Gallery upon Mond's death in 1909, and his home in Rome (owned by Hertz) became the Bibliotheca Hertziana – Max Planck Institute for Art History in 1912.

Richter's knowledge of languages and the art-historical environment in which she lived spurred her to translate the early works of German art history into English and to write volumes of her own. In 1883 she translated one of the most important works of art methodology, the connoissuership manual and manifesto of Giovanni Morelli, bringing Morelli's method to English readers.

In 1886 she published a novel, Melita: A Turkish Love Story, a romance set in Constantinople, based partly on her first-hand knowledge of Anatolia, and dedicated to her friend, Hertz. The Morning Post praised the detailed depiction of life in a harem, but found the fiction itself poor.

In 1901 she issued a small volume in the series on "art cities" of Siena. She issued another translation of Hermann Knackfuss's Rubens in 1904. Her survey of the art of Chantilly appeared in 1913.

In 1931 she moved to Lugano where she died on 9 January 1938, a few months after her husband.

== Selected works ==
=== Original works ===
- Melita: A Turkish Love-Story. London: T. Fisher Unwin, 1886
- Siena. Berühmte Kunststätten 9. Leipzig: Berlin, E. A. Seemann, 1901
- Chantilly in History and Art. London: J. Murray, 1913

=== Translations ===
- Morelli, Giovanni. Italian Masters in German Galleries. A Critical Essay on the Italian Pictures in the Galleries of Munich, Dresden, Berlin. London: G. Bell and Sons, 1883.
- Knackfuss, Hermann. Rubens. Bielefeld, Leipzig: Velhagen & Klasing, 1904
