= Palazzo Zuccari =

Palazzo Zuccari may refer to:

- Palazzo Zuccari, Florence
- Palazzo Zuccari, Rome
