= Jean Paul Richter =

German art historian

Jean-Paul Richter
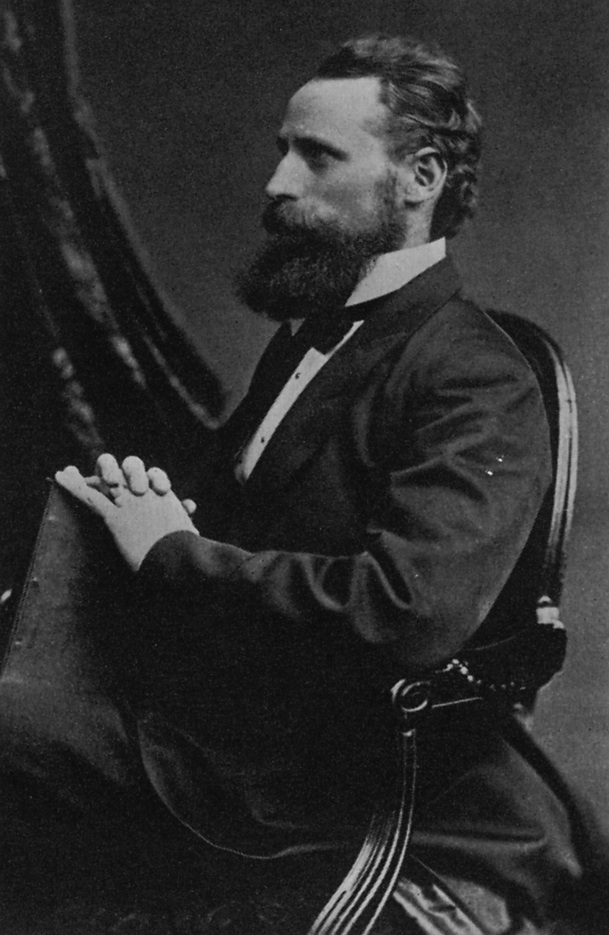
- Born: 7 June 1847; Dresden
- Died: 25 August 1937 (aged 90); Lugano

Jean-Paul Richter (7 June 1847 – 25 August 1937) was a German art historian and art dealer.

Born in Dresden as the son of a theologian, Richter studied theology himself, becoming tutor to the young Alexander Frederick, Landgrave of Hesse. His appointment as tutor gave him the opportunity to travel around Europe and he became interested in Italian art. He wrote tourist guides for Baedecker and in 1876 met Giovanni Morelli, whom he later introduced to Bernard Berenson. He moved to London in 1877 and wrote several catalogues of art, but is chiefly remembered today for his work on the notebooks of Leonardo da Vinci.

His wife Luise Marie Schwaab and their daughters Irma and Gisela M. A. Richter were also art historians.

The Richters became close friends with German-born industrialist, Ludwig Mond, and with his friend Henriette Hertz. In 1881, Hertz lived with the family in Notting Hill for several months and Jean Paul began tutoring her in art history. In 1883, during a stay at Mond's Norwich home, Louise Richter persuaded the newly-wealthy man to begin collecting art, and Jean Paul Richter began advising Mond on acquisitions. The impressive collection was bequeathed to the National Gallery upon Mond's death in 1909, and his home in Rome (owned by Hertz) became the Bibliotheca Hertziana – Max Planck Institute for Art History in 1912.
