= Chantilly cake =

Chantilly cake may refer to:

- Chantilly cake, a cake popular in Hawaii
- Berry chantilly cake, an American cake
