= Frida Mond =

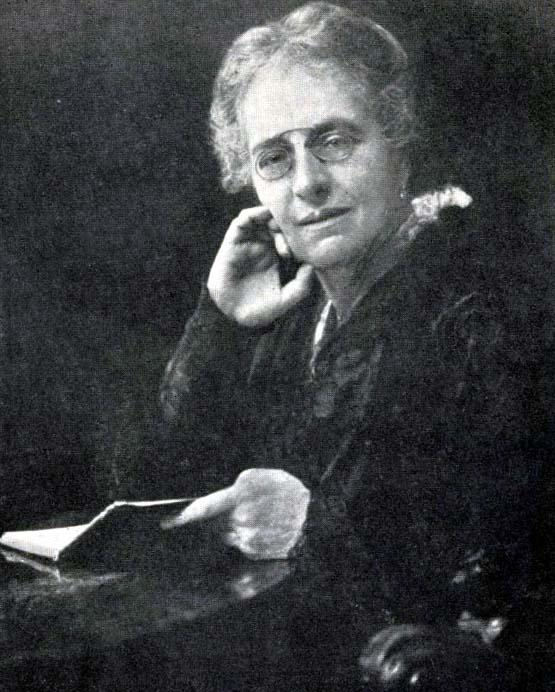
- Born: Frederike Löwenthal; 1847; Cologne
- Died: 16 May 1923 (aged 75–76)
- Spouse: Ludwig Mond

Frida Mond (1847 – 16 May 1923) was a German-born patron of the arts, who gave significant bequests to the British Academy and King's College London, during her lifetime and upon her death.

== Life ==
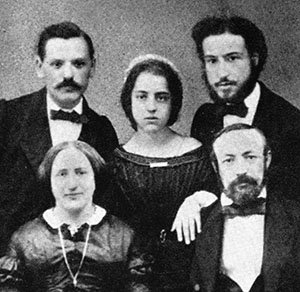
Back row, left to right Leopold Schweich, Frida (then) Löwenthal and Ludwig Mond in 1861, and in front are Frida's parents

Frida Mond was born Frederike Löwenthal in Cologne, Germany in 1847, the only child of Adolf Meyer Loewenthal. In 1866, she married her cousin Ludwig Mond, a chemist, manufacturer, and art collector, and the couple moved to England. Ludwig and Frida had two children: Robert Ludwig (1867-1938), who became a chemist and archaeologist, and Alfred Moritz (1868-1930), a company director and politician.

Though Frida and Ludwig had been raised in the Jewish faith, once in England they relinquished religion, including banning the Bible from their household 'because its cruel stories and allegories were considered unsuitable reading'. Frida's close friend and former schoolmate, Henriette Hertz joined the family in England, participating in their cultural, artistic, and intellectual pursuits, and providing vital company for Frida.

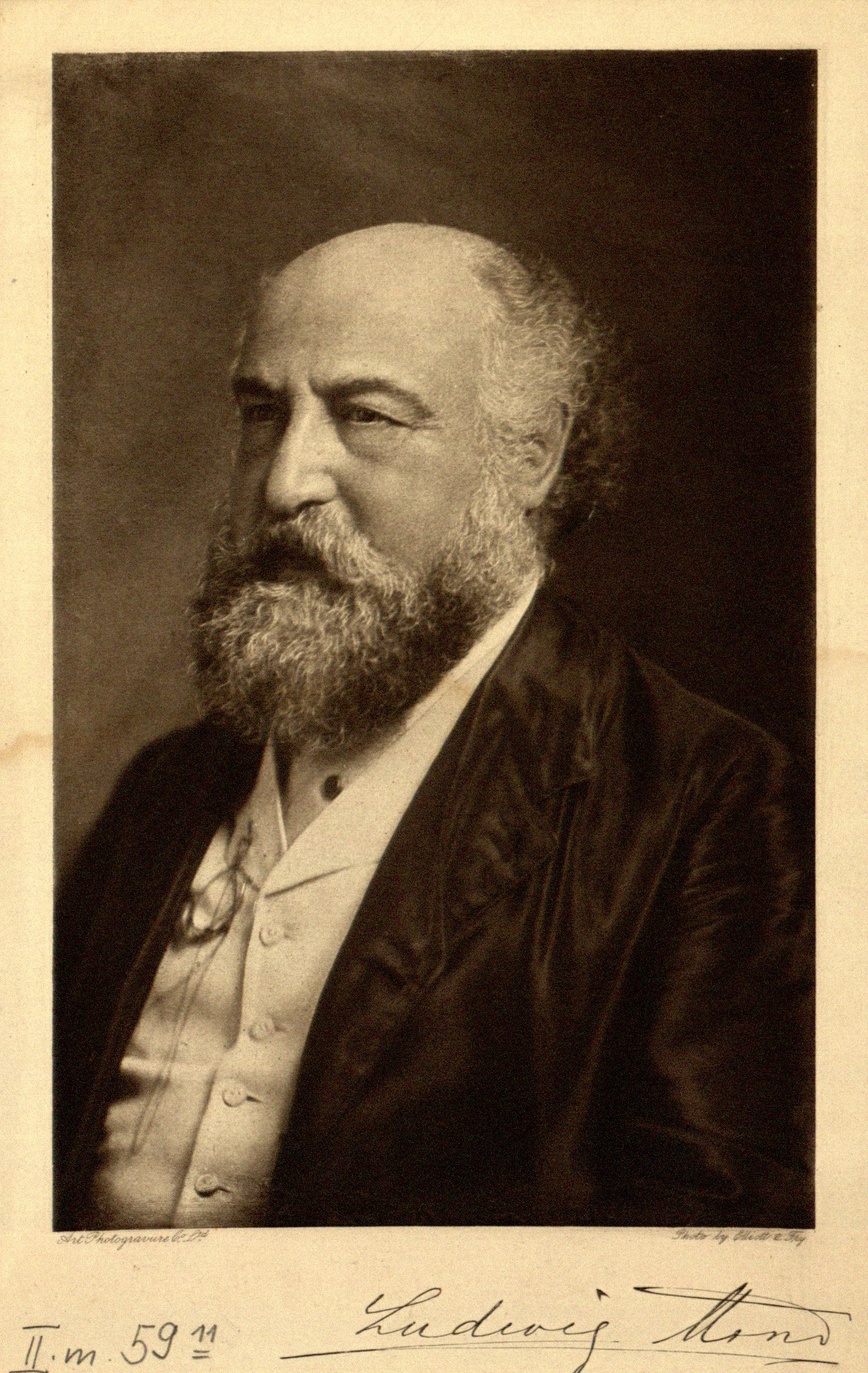
Ludwig Mond (1839-1909), who Frida married in 1866.

'Ludwig’s scientific eminence and curiosity were matched on Frida’s part by an equally passionate enthusiasm for literature and art', and the trio led 'a lavish life of travelling, entertaining and collecting', regularly spending winters at the Palazzo Zuccari, Rome. Frida was a member of The Folklore Society and the English Goethe Society.

On Ludwig's death in 1909, Frida became a wealthy widow. The following year, she wrote to her friend Israel Gollancz, secretary of the British Academy and a professor at King's College London, to offer:

for the acceptance of the British Academy, the sum of £500 a year for at least three years, to form the nucleus of a Fund (which it is hoped will be augmented by others donors, so that in time an annual income of about this amount may accrue) to be devoted to the furtherance of research and criticism, historical, philological, and philosophical, in the various branches of English literature, including the investigations of problems in the history and usage of English, written and spoken, and textual and documentary work elucidating the development of English language and literature.

Mond intended the fund to be used to establish an annual ‘Shakespeare oration or lecture', as well as a lecture on English poetry 'to be called the Warton Lecture, as a tribute to the memory of Thomas Warton, the first historian of English poetry'. The inaugural lectures in these series were delivered in 1911 and 1910 respectively. In 1920, Mond offered a further £1200 as an additional 'contribution towards the English Language and Literature Fund’.

== Legacy ==
In her will, Frida Mond bequeathed to the British Academy:

two thousand pounds for the endowment of a Lecture & Prize on subjects connected with Anglo-Saxon or Early English Language & Literature, English Philology, the History of English Literature and cognate studies.

She wished the fund associated with her Gollancz, who delivered the first lecture on the subject of ‘Old English Poetry’ in 1924. The inaugural ‘Biennial Prize for English Studies’ was awarded to philologist Joseph Wright the following year. On Gollancz's death in 1930, the lecture and prize were renamed for him (as Mond has wished).

Frida Mond bequeathed 300 books relating to German literature, particularly Friedrich Schiller and Johann Wolfgang von Goethe, to King's College London, as well as statues of Sappho and Sophocles. The gifted collection also included letters, portraits, busts, photographs, and other relics associated with Goethe and Schiller, as well as with Charlotte Buff, a friend of Goethe's.

Frida also left a lifetime annuity of £300 per year to her friend, the sculptor Anna Dabis, who had created a bust of Mond (now in the collection of King's College London).

In 2014, a 'legacy club' was established by the British Academy, and announced by its President Lord Stern. The club was intended 'to recognise and thank those who have pledged a legacy to the British Academy in their will', and was named the Mond Society.
