= Robert Mond =

British chemist and archaeologist

Sir Robert Mond
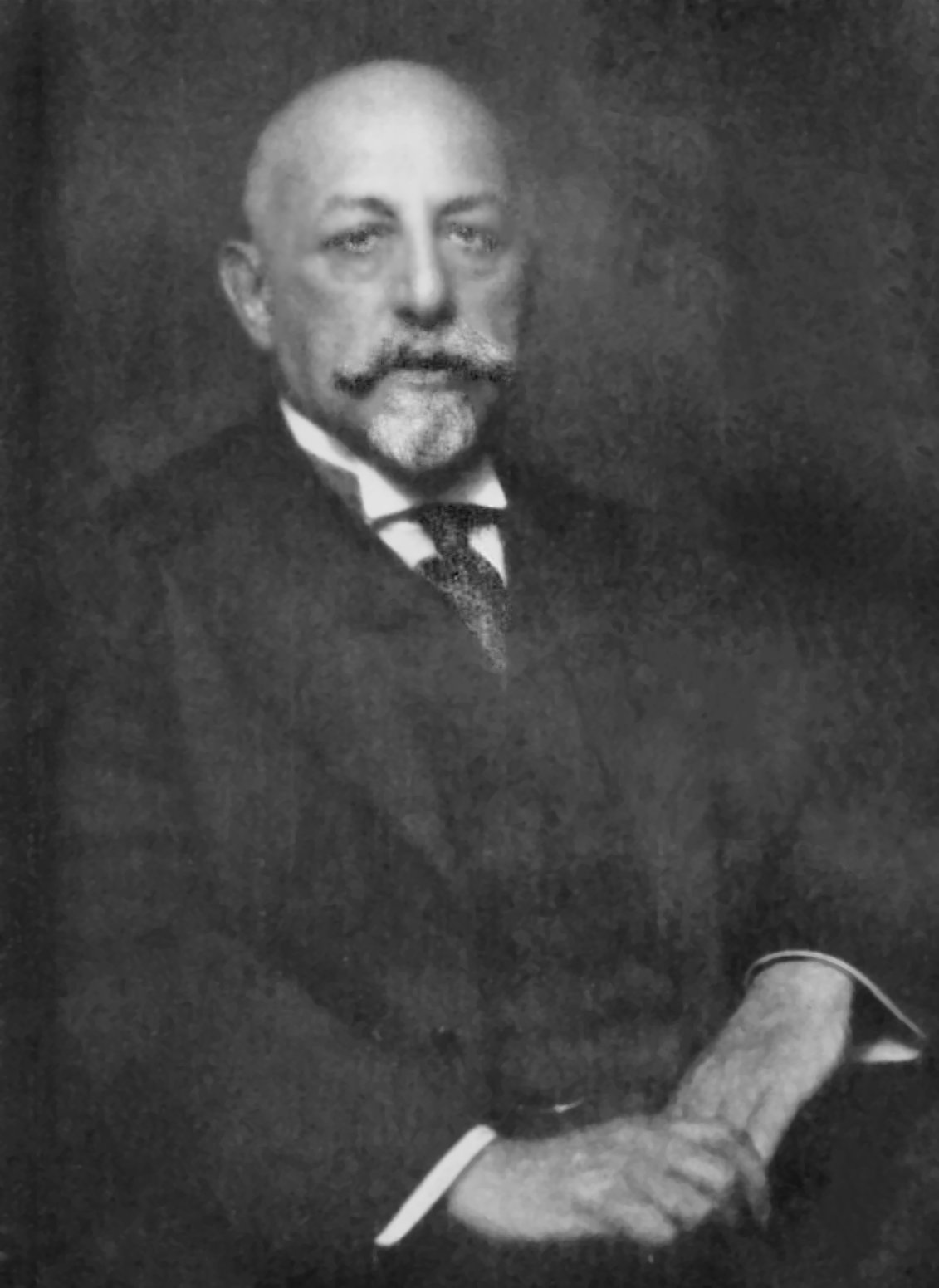
- Born: 9 September 1867; Farnworth, Widnes, Lancashire, England
- Died: 22 October 1938 (aged 71); Paris, France
- Education: Peterhouse, Cambridge, Zurich Polytechnic, University of Edinburgh, University of Glasgow
- Known for: Discovery of carbonyl compounds Egyptian archaeology
- Spouses: Helen Levis (m. 1898; died 1905) Marie-Louise Guggenheim, née Le Manac’h (m. 1922)
- Children: 2
- Awards: Messel medal of the Society of Chemical Industry; Chevalier of the Légion d’honneur
- Scientific career
- Fields: Chemist, archaeologist
- Workplaces: Brunner Mond & Company
- Doctoral advisor: William Thomson

Sir Robert Ludwig Mond, FRS, FRSE (9 September 1867 – 22 October 1938) was a British chemist and archaeologist.

== Early life and education ==
Mond was born at Farnworth, Widnes, Lancashire, the elder son of Ludwig Mond, a chemist and industrialist. He was educated at Cheltenham College, Peterhouse, Cambridge (BA 1888, MA 1892), Zurich Polytechnic, the University of Edinburgh and the University of Glasgow. At Glasgow he studied under William Thomson.

== Chemistry ==
Mond collaborated with his father in the discovery of the gaseous compound nickel carbonyl. He perfected the industrial production of iron carbonyl, and discovered the first derivative of a metallic carbonyl (cobalt nitroso-carbonyl) and a new ruthenium carbonyl. For a time he made trials of scientific farming. Following his father's heritage he became a director of Brunner Mond & Company and because of a connection with nickel mines in Canada he was a trustee of the Royal Ontario Museum in Toronto.

== Archaeology ==
Mond then took an interest in the archaeology of Ancient Egypt and worked with some of the major archaeologists of the time, including Percy Newberry, Howard Carter, Arthur Weigall and Alan Gardiner. With the last named he worked on the Theban Necropolis. After World War I he was involved with the preservation of the tomb of Ramesses I. He built up a considerable collection of artefacts which he bequeathed to the British Museum. He also performed archaeological work in Palestine, France and the Channel Islands and assisted in the foundation of a British School of Archaeology in Jerusalem. Robert Mond also took an interest in model soldiers building up a collection of 900 figures representing all the regiments in Napoleon's army.

== Honours and benefactions ==
Mond helped convert a house in Paris into the Maison de la Chimie which supported the work of chemistry in France and he was a benefactor of the British Institute in Paris. He also made large donations to the universities of Liverpool, Manchester and Toronto.

He was elected to membership of the Manchester Literary and Philosophical Society on 6 February 1894

Mond was knighted in 1932. He received numerous honours including the honorary degrees of LL.D from the universities of Liverpool and Toronto, and D.Sc from the University of London. He was made president of the Faraday Society (1930–1932) and was awarded the Messel medal of the Society of Chemical Industry. He was elected Fellow of the Royal Society of Edinburgh and Fellow of the Royal Society. In France he became Chevalier of the Légion d’honneur and a member of the Académie des Inscriptions et Belles-Lettres, thereby joining the Institut de France. He was elected president of the Société de Chimie.

== Personal life ==
Robert Mond married twice. In 1898 he married Helen Levis and they had two daughters but Helen died in 1905, following the birth of their second daughter in 1901. In her memory Mond founded the Infants' Hospital in Vincent Square, London. In 1922 he married Marie-Louise Guggenheim (née Le Manac'h) of Belle-Île-en-Terre, Brittany and following this spent more of his life in France.

He died in Paris and was cremated at the Père Lachaise Crematorium and his ashes were buried at his home at Belle-Île-en-Terre in Brittany.

== See also ==
- Melchett Medal
