= Hou Debang =

Chinese scientist

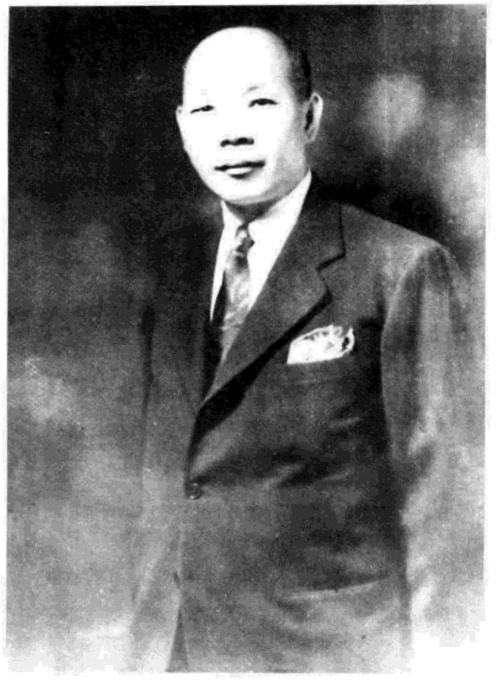
Hou Debang

Hou Debang (Chinese: 侯德榜; 9 August 1890 – 26 August 1974), also known as Hou Qirong (侯启荣) and Hou Te-Pang, was a Chinese chemist and chemical engineer. He was born in Taijiang District of Fuzhou (then known as Houguan County). Graduating from Tsinghua Preparatory School in 1912, Hou was one of the scholars sent to the United States to study modern technologies. He obtained his master's degree in chemical engineering at Massachusetts Institute of Technology (1917), and later obtained his doctoral degree at Columbia University (1921).

From 1950, Hou Debang served as a consultant in the chemical industry bureau of the Ministry of Heavy Industry. In 1957 he joined the Chinese Communist Party and in 1959 was appointed minister of the Ministry of Industry and Information Technology of the People's Republic of China. Among Hou's discoveries was his 1933 improvement to the Solvay process for producing sodium carbonate.

On August 26, 1974, already ill from leukemia, he suffered a cerebral hemorrhage and died.
