= Gisela Richter =

British-American art historian and archaeologist (1882–1972)

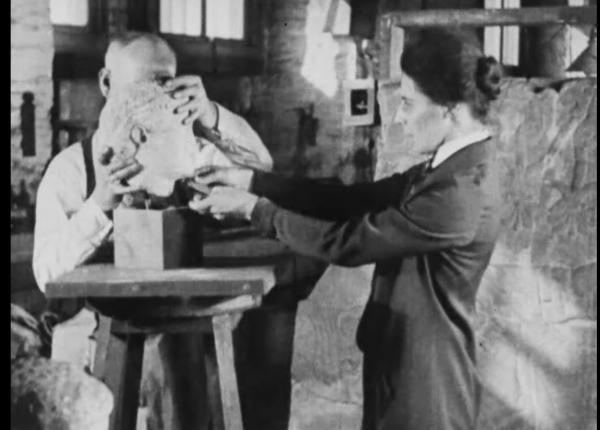
- Mounting a sculpture at the Metropolitan Museum of Art, 1918
- Born: 14 or 15 August 1882; London
- Died: 24 December 1972 (aged 90)
- Resting place: Protestant Cemetery, Rome
- Citizenship: American
- Occupations: Art historian and classical archaeologist

Academic background
- Education: Maida Vale School; Girton College, Cambridge

Academic work
- Institutions: Metropolitan Museum of Art

Gisela Marie Augusta Richter (14 or 15 August 1882 – 24 December 1972) was a British-American classical archaeologist and art historian. She was a prominent figure and an authority in her field.

== Early life ==
Gisela Richter was born in London, England, the daughter of Jean Paul and Louise (Schwaab) Richter. Both of her parents and her sister, Irma, were art historians specialised in Italian Renaissance. Richter was educated at Maida Vale School, one of the finest schools for women at the time. She decided to become a classical archaeologist while attending Emmanuel Loewy's lectures at the University of Rome around 1896. In 1901, she began attending Girton College at the University of Cambridge. At Girton, Richter's six closest friends included Lady Dorothy Georgiana Howard, the daughter of the 9th Earl and "Radical Countess" of Carlisle, and future candidate for Roman Catholic Sainthood Anna Abrikosova. Richter was included when all seven girls were brought by Lady Dorothy to Castle Howard and Naworth Castle as honored guests during college vacations.

Richter left Girton in 1904 without a degree, since women at the time could not graduate, and she spent a year at the British School at Athens between 1904 and 1905. Richter moved to the U.S. in 1905 and became a naturalized American citizen in 1917.

== Career ==
Richter joined the Metropolitan Museum of Art in New York as an assistant in 1905, where she was asked to create a catalogue for a collection of Greek vases recently acquired by the Met from the Canessa Brothers, the famous European art dealers. She became assistant curator in 1910, promoted to associate curator in 1922, and curator of Greek and Roman art in 1925, a position she held until 1948 when she retired. Richter became honorary curator until her death in 1972. She became the first woman to hold the title of curator at the Met when she was appointed to the post in 1925. As curator, she was one of the most influential people in classical art history at the time.

Richter lectured at Columbia University, Yale University, Bryn Mawr College, and Oberlin College. As author of numerous popular books on classical art, she had a great influence on the general public's understanding and appreciation of the subject. In 1944, she received the Achievement Award from the American Association of University Women. In 1952, she was awarded the degree of Doctor of Letters by the University of Oxford. In 1968, she received the Gold Medal Award for Distinguished Archaeological Achievement from the Archaeological Institute of America.

She was elected as a member of the American Philosophical Society in 1942.

== Death and legacy ==
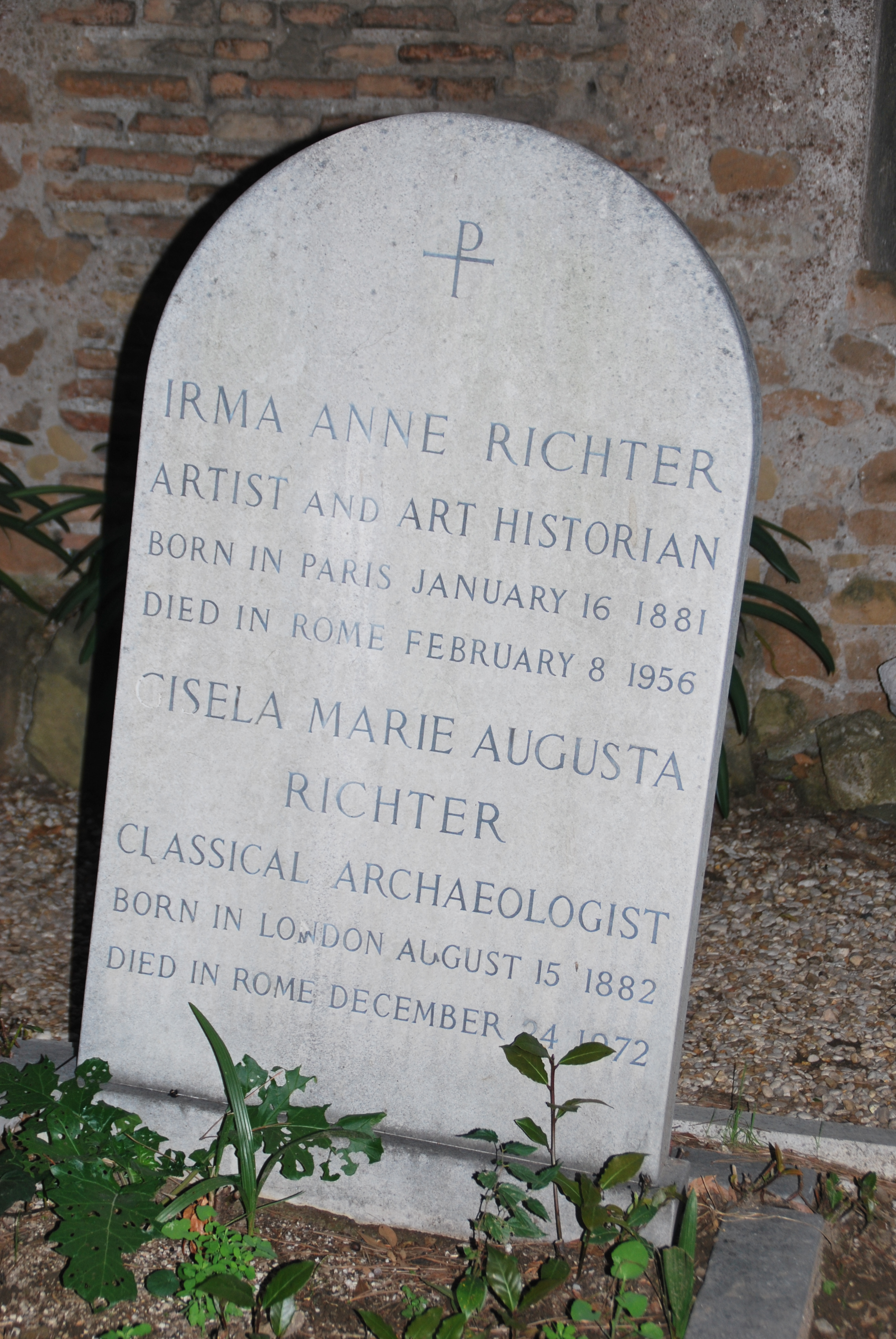
Richter's grave in the cimitero acattolico in Rome

In 1952, Richter moved to Rome, Italy, where she died in 1972. She is buried in Rome's Protestant Cemetery. Writing 30 years after Richter's death, Camille Paglia paid tribute to her "for her clarity and rigor of mind; her fineness of sensibility and connoisseurship; her attention to detail and her power of observation and deduction; her mastery of form and design".

== Selected publications ==
- Greek, Etruscan and Roman Bronzes, Gilliss Press, 1915.
- Catalogue of Engraved Gems of the Classical Style, Metropolitan Museum of Art, 1920.
- Handbook of the Classical Collection, Metropolitan Museum of Art, 1922.
- The Craft of Athenian Pottery, Yale University Press, 1923.
- Lectures by Edith R. Abbot and Gisela M.A. Richter for students in New York universities, members of the museum and others, Metropolitan Museum of Art, 1934
- Ancient Furniture, Clarendon Press, 1926.
- Animals in Greek Sculpture: A Survey, Oxford University Press, 1930.
- Red-Figured Athenian Vases in the Metropolitan Museum of Art, Volume 1 (Text) and 2 (Plates), Yale University Press, 1936.
- Etruscan terracotta warriors in the Metropolitan Museum of Art with a report on structure and technique by Charles F. Binns. Metropolitan Museum of Art, 1937.
- Augustan art : an exhibition commemorating the bimillennium of the birth of Augustus, New York, January 4, 1939, through February 19, by Gisela Richter and Christine Alexander. Metropolitan Museum of art, 1939.
- Handbook of the Etruscan Collection, Metropolitan Museum of Art, 1940.
- Ancient Gems from the Evans and Beatty Collections, Metropolitan Museum of Art, 1942.
- Archaic Attic Gravestones, Harvard University Press, 1944.
- Greek Painting : The Development of Pictorial Representation from Archaic to Graeco-Roman Times, Metropolitan Museum of Art, 1944.
- A Brief Guide to the Greek Collection, Metropolitan Museum of Art, New York, N.Y., 1947.
- Roman Portraits, Metropolitan Museum of Art, 1948.
- Archaic Greek Art against Its Historical Background, Oxford University Press, 1949.
- Three Critical Periods in Greek Sculpture, Oxford University Press, 1952.
- Attic Black-Figured Kylikes, Harvard University Press, 1953.
- Handbook of the Greek Collection, Harvard University Press, 1953.
- Catalogue of Greek Sculptures, Metropolitan Museum of Art, Harvard University Press, 1954.
- Ancient Italy, University of Michigan Press, 1955.
- Catalogue of Greek and Roman Antiquities in the Dumbarton Oaks Collection, Harvard University Press, 1956.
- Attic Red-Figured Vases, Yale University Press, 1946, revised edition, 1958.
- The Archaic Gravestones of Attica, Phaidon, 1961.
- Greek Portraits, Latomus, Volume I, 1955, Volume II, 1959, Volume III, 1960, Volume IV, 1962, Volume V, 1964.
- The Furniture of the Greeks, Etruscans, and Romans, Phaidon, 1966.
- Korai: Archaic Greek Maidens, Phaidon, 1968.
- A Handbook of Greek Art, Phaidon, 1959, 6th edition, 1969.
- (With Irma Richter) Kouroi: Archaic Greek Youths, Oxford University Press, 1942, 3rd edition, Phaidon, 1970.
- Engraved Gems of the Greeks and the Etruscans, Praeger, Volume I, 1968, Volume II, 1971.
- Perspective in Greek and Roman Art, Phaidon, 1970.
- The Sculpture and Sculptors of the Greeks, Yale University Press, 1929, 4th revised edition, 1970.
- The Portraits of the Greeks, three volumes, Phaidon, 1965, supplement, 1972.
- Shapes and Names of Athenian Vases. By Gisela M. A. Richter and Marjorie J. Milne. Plantin, 1935, reprinted, McGrath, 1973.

== Necrology ==
- Frank E. Brown, Studi Etruschi 41 (1973)
- Homer Thompson, American Philosophical Society-Yearbook (1973)
- Cornelius C. Vermeule III, The Burlington Magazine 115 (1973)

== References and sources ==
Sources

- My Memoirs: Recollections of an Archaeologist's Life, by Gisela Richter, 1972.
- "Gisela Richter," in Notable American Women, ed. Barbara Sicherman and Carol H. Green, 1980.
- "Scholar of Classical Art and Museum Archaeologist," in Women as Interpreters of the Visual Arts, 1820–1979, ed. Claire R. Sherman,1981
- "Gisela Richter", in Invisible Giants: 50 Americans That Shaped the Nation but Missed the History Books, Oxford University Press; March 2002.
