= Solvay process =

Method for production of sodium carbonate

The Solvay process or ammonia–soda process is the major industrial process for the production of sodium carbonate (soda ash, Na_{2}CO_{3}). The ammonia–soda process was developed into its modern form by the Belgian chemist Ernest Solvay during the 1860s. The ingredients for this are readily available and inexpensive: salt brine (from inland sources or from the sea) and limestone (from quarries). The worldwide production of soda ash in 2005 was estimated at 42 million tonnes, which is more than six kilograms (13 lb) per year for each person on Earth. Solvay-based chemical plants now produce roughly three-quarters of this supply, with the remaining being mined from natural deposits. This method superseded the Leblanc process.

== History ==
The name "soda ash" is based on the principal historical method of obtaining alkali, which was by using water to extract it from the ashes of certain plants. Wood fires yielded potash and its predominant ingredient potassium carbonate (K_{2}CO_{3}), whereas the ashes from these special plants yielded "soda ash" and its predominant ingredient sodium carbonate (Na_{2}CO_{3}). The word "soda" (from the Middle Latin) originally referred to certain plants that grow in salt solubles; it was discovered that the ashes of these plants yielded the useful alkali soda ash. The cultivation of such plants reached a particularly high state of development in the 18th century in Spain, where the plants are named barrilla (or "barilla" in English). The ashes of kelp also yield soda ash and were the basis of an enormous 18th-century industry in Scotland. Alkali was also mined from dry lakebeds in Egypt.

By the late 18th century these sources were insufficient to meet Europe's burgeoning demand for alkali for soap, textile, and glass industries. In 1791, the French physician Nicolas Leblanc developed a method to manufacture soda ash using salt, limestone, sulfuric acid, and coal. Although the Leblanc process came to dominate alkali production in the early 19th century, the expense of its inputs and its polluting byproducts (including hydrogen chloride gas) made it apparent that it was far from an ideal solution.

It has been reported that in 1811 French physicist Augustin Jean Fresnel discovered that sodium bicarbonate precipitates when carbon dioxide is bubbled through ammonia-containing brines – which is the chemical reaction central to the Solvay process. The discovery wasn't published. As has been noted by Desmond Reilly, "The story of the evolution of the ammonium–soda process is an interesting example of the way in which a discovery can be made and then laid aside and not applied for a considerable time afterwards." Serious consideration of this reaction as the basis of an industrial process dates from the British patent issued in 1834 to H. G. Dyar and J. Hemming. There were several attempts to reduce this reaction to industrial practice, with varying success.

In 1861, Belgian industrial chemist Ernest Solvay turned his attention to the problem; he was apparently largely unaware of the extensive earlier work. His solution was a 24 m (79 ft) gas absorption tower in which carbon dioxide bubbled up through a descending flow of brine. This, together with efficient recovery and recycling of the ammonia, proved effective. By 1864 Solvay and his brother Alfred had acquired financial backing and constructed a plant in Couillet, today a suburb of the Belgian town of Charleroi. The new process proved more economical and less polluting than the Leblanc method, and its use spread. In 1874, the Solvays expanded their facilities with a new, larger plant at Nancy, France.

In the same year, Ludwig Mond visited Solvay in Belgium and acquired rights to use the new technology. He and John Brunner formed the firm of Brunner, Mond & Co., and built a Solvay plant at Winnington, near Northwich, Cheshire, England. The facility began operating in 1874. Mond was instrumental in making the Solvay process a commercial success. He made several refinements between 1873 and 1880 that removed byproducts that could slow or halt the process.

In 1884, the Solvay brothers licensed Americans William B. Cogswell and Rowland Hazard to produce soda ash in the US, and formed a joint venture (Solvay Process Company) to build and operate a plant in Solvay, New York.

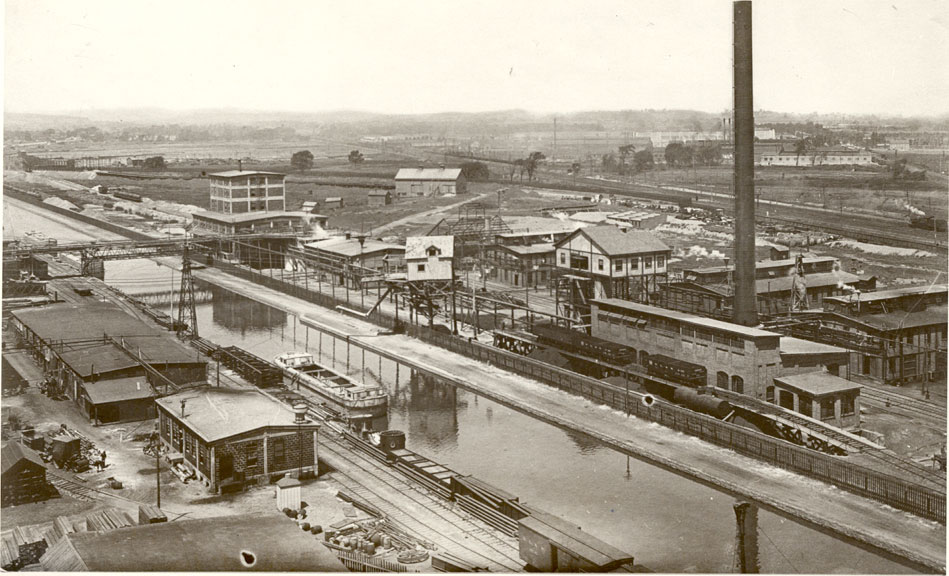
Solvay Process Plant in Solvay, New York; the Erie Canal passed through this plant until about 1917. From the Solvay Process collection of the Solvay, New York, Public Library.

By the 1890s, Solvay-process plants produced the majority of the world's soda ash.

In 1938 large deposits of the mineral trona were discovered near the Green River in Wyoming from which sodium carbonate can be extracted more cheaply than produced by the process. The original Solvay New York plant closed in 1986, replaced in the US by a factory in Green River. Throughout the rest of the world, the Solvay process remains the major source of soda ash.

== Chemistry ==
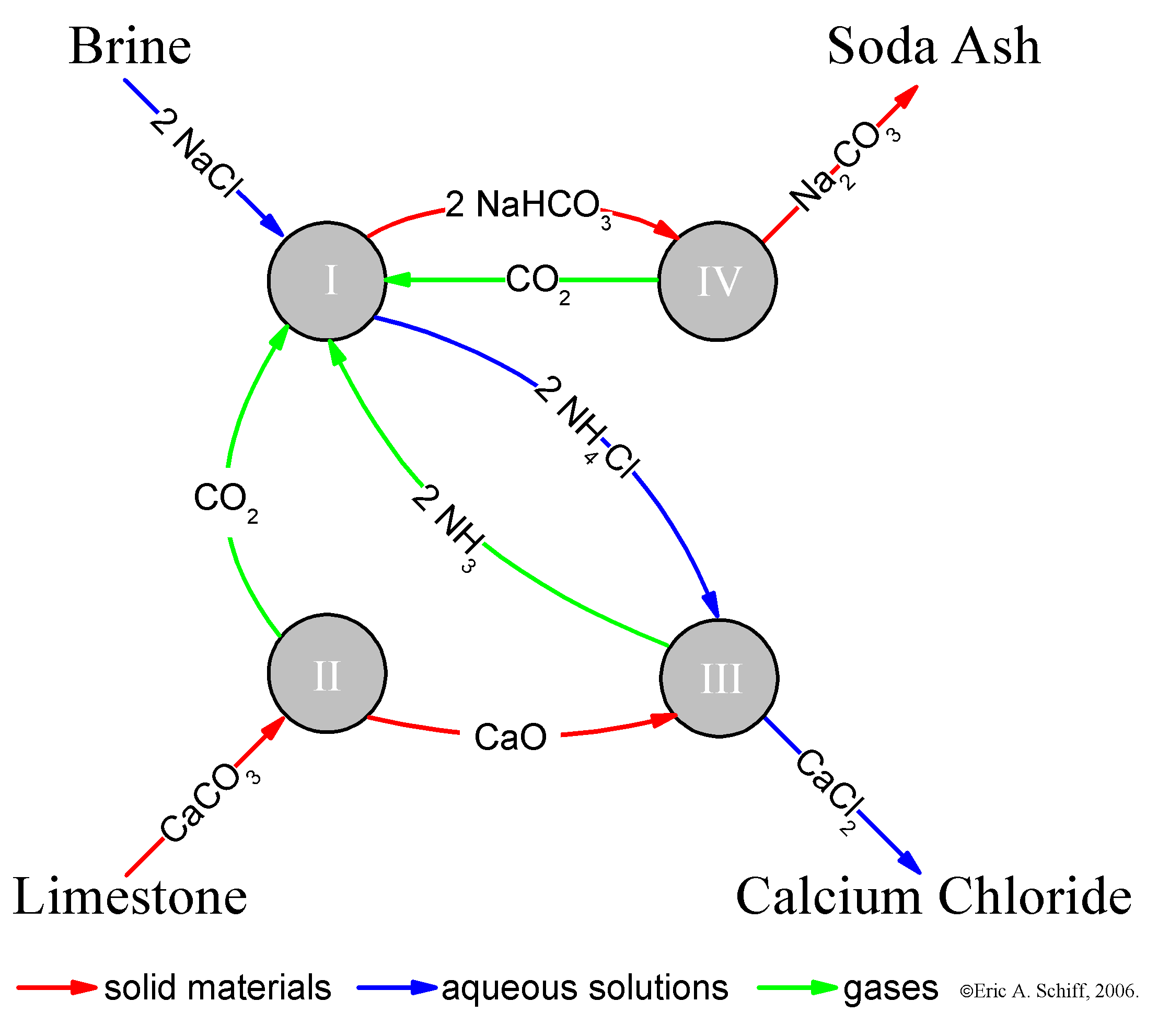
Chemistry of the Solvay Process. Each circle represents a reaction.

The Solvay Process as an example of a cyclic process in chemical industry (green = reactants, black = intermediates, red = products)

The Solvay process results in soda ash, predominantly sodium carbonate (Na_{2}CO_{3}) from brine as a source of sodium chloride (NaCl) and from limestone as a source of calcium carbonate (CaCO_{3}). The overall process is:

2 NaCl + CaCO_{3} → Na_{2}CO_{3} + CaCl_{2}

The actual implementation of this global overall reaction is multi-staged and cyclical, involving the reuse of ammonia and carbon dioxide produced in later stages as inputs into earlier steps. A simplified description can be given using the four different, interacting chemical reactions illustrated in the figure.

In the first step in the process, carbon dioxide (CO_{2}) passes through a concentrated aqueous solution of sodium chloride (table salt, NaCl) and ammonia (NH_{3}).

NaCl + CO_{2} + NH_{3} + H_{2}O → NaHCO_{3} + NH_{4}Cl (I)

In industrial practice, the reaction is carried out by passing concentrated brine (salt water) through two towers. In the first, ammonia bubbles up through the brine and is absorbed by it. In the second, carbon dioxide bubbles up through the ammoniated brine, and sodium bicarbonate (baking soda) precipitates out of the solution. Note that, in a basic solution, NaHCO_{3} is less water-soluble than sodium chloride. The ammonia (NH_{3}) buffers the solution at a basic (high) pH; without the ammonia, a hydrochloric acid byproduct would render the solution acidic, and arrest the precipitation. Here, NH_{3} along with ammoniacal brine acts as a mother liquor.

The necessary ammonia "catalyst" for reaction (I) is reclaimed in a later step, and relatively little ammonia is consumed. The carbon dioxide required for reaction (I) is produced by heating ("calcination") of the limestone at 950–1100 °C, and by calcination of the sodium bicarbonate (see below). The calcium carbonate (CaCO_{3}) in the limestone is partially converted to quicklime (calcium oxide (CaO)) and carbon dioxide:

CaCO_{3} → CO_{2} + CaO (II)

The sodium bicarbonate (NaHCO_{3}) that precipitates out in reaction (I) is filtered out from the hot ammonium chloride (NH_{4}Cl) solution, and the solution is then reacted with the quicklime (calcium oxide (CaO)) left over from heating the limestone in step (II).

2 NH_{4}Cl + CaO → 2 NH_{3} + CaCl_{2} + H_{2}O (III)

CaO makes a strong basic solution. The ammonia from reaction (III) is recycled back to the initial brine solution of reaction (I).

The sodium bicarbonate (NaHCO_{3}) precipitate from reaction (I) is then converted to the final product, sodium carbonate (washing soda: Na_{2}CO_{3}), by calcination (160–230 °C), producing water and carbon dioxide as byproducts:

2 NaHCO_{3} → Na_{2}CO_{3} + H_{2}O + CO_{2} (IV)

The carbon dioxide from step (IV) is recovered for re-use in step (I). When properly designed and operated, a Solvay plant can reclaim almost all its ammonia, and consumes only small amounts of additional ammonia to make up for losses. The only major inputs to the Solvay process are salt, limestone and thermal energy, and its only major byproduct is calcium chloride, which is sometimes sold as road salt.

After the invention of the Haber and other new ammonia-producing processes in the 1910s and 1920s its price dropped, and there was less need in reclaiming it. So in the modified Solvay process developed by Chinese chemist Hou Debang in 1930s, the first few steps are the same as the Solvay process, but the CaCl_{2} is supplanted by ammonium chloride (NH_{4}Cl). Instead of treating the remaining solution with lime, carbon dioxide and ammonia are pumped into the solution, then sodium chloride is added until the solution saturates at 40 °C. Next, the solution is cooled to 10 °C. Ammonium chloride precipitates and is removed by filtration, and the solution is recycled to produce more sodium carbonate. Hou's process eliminates the production of calcium chloride. The byproduct ammonium chloride can be refined, used as a fertilizer and may have greater commercial value than CaCl_{2}, thus reducing the extent of waste beds.

Additional details of the industrial implementation of this process are available in the report prepared for the European Soda Ash Producer's Association.

== Byproducts and wastes ==
The principal byproduct of the Solvay process is calcium chloride (CaCl_{2}) in aqueous solution. The process has other waste and byproducts as well. Not all of the limestone that is calcined is converted to quicklime and carbon dioxide (in reaction II); the residual calcium carbonate and other components of the limestone become wastes. In addition, the salt brine used by the process is usually purified to remove magnesium and calcium ions, typically to form carbonates (MgCO_{3}, CaCO_{3}); otherwise, these impurities would lead to scale in the various reaction vessels and towers. These carbonates are additional waste products.

In inland plants, such as that in Solvay, New York, the byproducts have been deposited in "waste beds"; the weight of material deposited in these waste beds exceeded that of the soda ash produced by about 50%. These waste beds have led to water pollution, principally by calcium and chloride. The waste beds in Solvay, New York substantially increased the salinity in nearby Onondaga Lake, which used to be among the most polluted lakes in the U.S. and is a superfund pollution site. As such waste beds age, they do begin to support plant communities which have been the subject of several scientific studies.

At seaside locations, such as those at Saurashtra, Gujarat, India, the CaCl_{2} solution may be discharged directly into the sea, apparently without substantial environmental harm (although small amounts of heavy metals in it may be a problem), the major concern is discharge location falls within the Marine National Park of Gulf of Kutch which serves as habitat for coral reefs, seagrass and seaweed community. At Osborne, South Australia, a settling pond is now used to remove 99% of the CaCl_{2} as the former discharge was silting up the shipping channel. At Rosignano Solvay in Tuscany, Italy the limestone waste produced by the Solvay factory has changed the landscape, producing the "Spiagge Bianche" ("White Beaches"). A report published in 1999 by the United Nations Environment Programme (UNEP), listed Spiagge Bianche among the priority pollution hot spots in the coastal areas of the Mediterranean Sea.

== Carbon sequestration and the Solvay process ==
Variations in the Solvay process have been proposed for carbon sequestration. One idea is to react carbon dioxide, produced perhaps by the combustion of coal, to form solid carbonates (such as sodium bicarbonate) that could be permanently stored, thus avoiding carbon dioxide emission into the atmosphere. The Solvay process could be modified to give the overall reaction:

2 NaCl + CaCO_{3} + CO_{2} + H_{2}O → 2 NaHCO_{3} + CaCl_{2}

Variations in the Solvay process have been proposed to convert carbon dioxide emissions into sodium carbonates, but carbon sequestration by calcium or magnesium carbonates appears more promising. However, the amount of carbon dioxide which can be used for carbon sequestration with calcium or magnesium (when compared to the total amount of carbon dioxide exhausted by mankind) is very low. This is primarily due to the major feasibility difference between capturing carbon dioxide from controlled and concentrated emission sources such as from coal-fired power plants as compared to capturing carbon from non-concentrated small-scale carbon sources such as small fires, vehicle exhaust, human respiration etc. when using such methods. Moreover, variation on the Solvay process will most probably add an additional energy consuming step, which will increase carbon dioxide emissions unless carbon neutral energy sources like hydropower, nuclear energy, wind or solar power are used.

== See also ==
- Chloralkali process
- Hou's process, a production method similar to the Solvay process but ammonia is not recycled
