= Chantilly =

Chantilly may refer to:

== Places ==
=== France ===
- Chantilly, Oise, a city
  - US Chantilly, a football club
- Château de Chantilly

=== United States ===
- Chantilly, Missouri, an unincorporated community
- Chantilly (Charlotte neighborhood), North Carolina
- Chantilly, Virginia, an unincorporated area in Fairfax County
  - Chantilly High School
- Chantilly (Montross, Virginia), a historic archaeological site

== Other ==
- Battle of Chantilly, in Virginia during the American Civil War
- Chantilly Codex, a medieval manuscript
- Chantilly Conferences, during World War I
- Chantilly cream, another term for whipped cream
- Chantilly lace, from Chantilly, Oise
- Chantilly Lace (film), 1993
- "Chantilly Lace" (song), 1958, by The Big Bopper
- Chantilly porcelain, made at the château from 1730
- Chantilly Racecourse, for horse racing, in Oise
- Chantilly-Tiffany, a breed of domestic cat
- Chantilly cake
