= Mond gas =

Mond gas is a cheap coal gas that was used for industrial heating purposes. Coal gases are made by decomposing coal through heating it to a high temperature. Coal gases were the primary source of gas fuel during the 1940s and 1950s until the adoption of natural gas. They were used for lighting, heating, and cooking, typically being supplied to households through pipe distribution systems. The gas was named after its discoverer, Ludwig Mond.

== Discovery ==
In 1889, Ludwig Mond discovered that the combustion of coal with air and steam produced ammonia along with an extra gas, which was named the Mond gas. He discovered this while looking for a process to form ammonium sulfate, which was useful in agriculture. The process involved reacting low-quality coal with superheated steam, which produced the Mond gas. The gas was then passed through dilute sulfuric acid spray, which ultimately removed the ammonia, forming ammonium sulfate.

Mond modified the gasification process by restricting the air supply and filling the air with steam, providing a low working temperature. This temperature was below ammonia's point of dissociation, maximizing the amount of ammonia that could be produced from the nitrogen, a product from superheating coal.

== Gas production ==
The Mond gas process was designed to convert cheap coal into flammable gas, which was made up of mainly hydrogen, while recovering ammonium sulfate. The gas produced was rich in hydrogen and poor in carbon monoxide. Although it could be used for some industrial purposes and power generation, the gas was limited for heating or lighting.

In 1897, the first Mond gas plant began at the Brunner Mond & Company in Northwich, Cheshire. Mond plants which recovered ammonia needed to be large in order to be profitable, using at least 182 tons of coal per week.

=== Reaction ===
Predominant reaction in Mond Gas Process: C + 2H_{2}O = CO_{2}+ 2H_{2}

The Mond gas was composed of roughly:

- 12% CO (Carbon monoxide)
- 28% H_{2} (Hydrogen)
- 2.2% CH_{4} (Methane)
- 16% CO_{2} (Carbon dioxide)
- 42% N_{2} (Nitrogen)

== Uses ==
Mond gas could be produced and used more efficiently than other gases in the late 19th and early 20th century. The gas was used as fuel for street lighting and basic residential uses that required gas such as ovens, kilns, furnaces, and boilers.

=== Advantages ===
The Mond gas could be produced very cheaply since it required only a low-quality coal, offering large savings for many processes. The production of Mond gas did not require much labor.

The Mond gas became popularized during the industrial power generation in the beginning of the 20th century, since industries were very interested in a source of low-cost energy. The Mond gas provided a boost to the gas engine industry in particular. For example, a large gas engine that used Mond gas was 5–6 times more efficient than a standard steam engine. This is primarily because Mond gas was produced from the lowest cost coal rather than steam coal, resulting in cheaper electricity at about 1/20 of the normal price.

=== Modern use ===
The Mond gas was used primarily during the early 20th century, and its process was further developed by the Power Gas Corporation as the Lymn system; however, the gas has been widely forgotten.

The use of coal gases has become far less popular due to the adoption of natural gas in the 1960s. Natural gases were better for the environment because they burned more cleanly than other fuels such as coal and oil and could also be transported more safely and efficiently over sea.
