= Anna Dabis =

German artist

- Born: 1847; Rügen, Germany
- Died: 13 March 1927 (aged 79–80); Southfleet, Kent
- Education: National Art Training School

Anna Dabis (1847–13 March 1927) was a German sculptor who spent a large part of her career in Britain.

== Biography ==
Dabis was born on the island of Rügen in Germany, where her father was a pastor. After her parents died at an early age, Dabis was raised by relatives before moving to England around 1881 to take a teaching post. She enrolled in the National Art Training School in South Kensington where she was taught sculpture by Édouard Lantéri and won a silver medal in the 1885 National Competition.

Dabis began to produce medals, busts, heads and statuettes, often in bronze and between 1888 and 1895 she exhibited ten works at the Royal Academy in London. She supported the suffragette movement and in 1889 she signed the Declaration in Favour of Women's Suffrage. After living in London for many years, Dabis moved to Southfleet in Kent. King's College London holds her bronzed plaster bust of Frida Mond.
