= Tata Chemicals Europe =

UK-based chemicals company

- Type: Subsidiary
- Industry: Chemicals
- Founded: 2005; 21 years ago
- Headquarters: Northwich, Cheshire, England
- Key people: Adrian O’Shea - Country Manager and Operations Director
- Products: Sodium carbonate (soda ash), sodium bicarbonate, calcium chloride, sodium sesquicarbonate
- Parent: Tata Chemicals
- Website: Tata Chemicals Europe

Tata Chemicals Europe (formerly Brunner Mond (UK) Limited) is a UK-based chemicals company that is a subsidiary of Tata Chemicals, itself a part of the India-based Tata Group. Its principal products are soda ash, sodium bicarbonate, calcium chloride and associated alkaline chemicals.

Founded in 1873 by John Brunner and Ludwig Mond and incorporated in 1881, the business became the largest producer of soda ash in the world during the 1890s. In 1917, the company's trinitrotoluene (TNT) factory in Silvertown, London exploded due to a fire. During 1926, Brunner Mond was one of the four main companies – along with British Dyestuffs Corporation, Nobel's Explosives, and the United Alkali Company – that merged to create Imperial Chemical Industries (ICI). During the early 1990s, ICI opted to separate and demerge some of its soda ash businesses as Brunner Mond Holdings Limited.

During 1997, it was floated on the London Stock Market before being promptly acquired by private equity firms. In early 2006, Brunner Mond was acquired by Tata Chemicals and adopted the Tata Chemicals Europe brand five years later. The firm acquired British Salt during December 2010 and opened the first industrial-scale carbon capture and usage plant in the UK in 2022. During 2024, it decided to transfer production of soda ash from its Lostock site to a new £60 million facility in Northwich.

== History ==
=== 19th century ===
Statues of Sir John Brunner & Ludwig Mond which straddle the main entrance to Brunner Mond House, the offices at the Winnington Works, Northwich, Cheshire, now Tata Chemicals Europe.

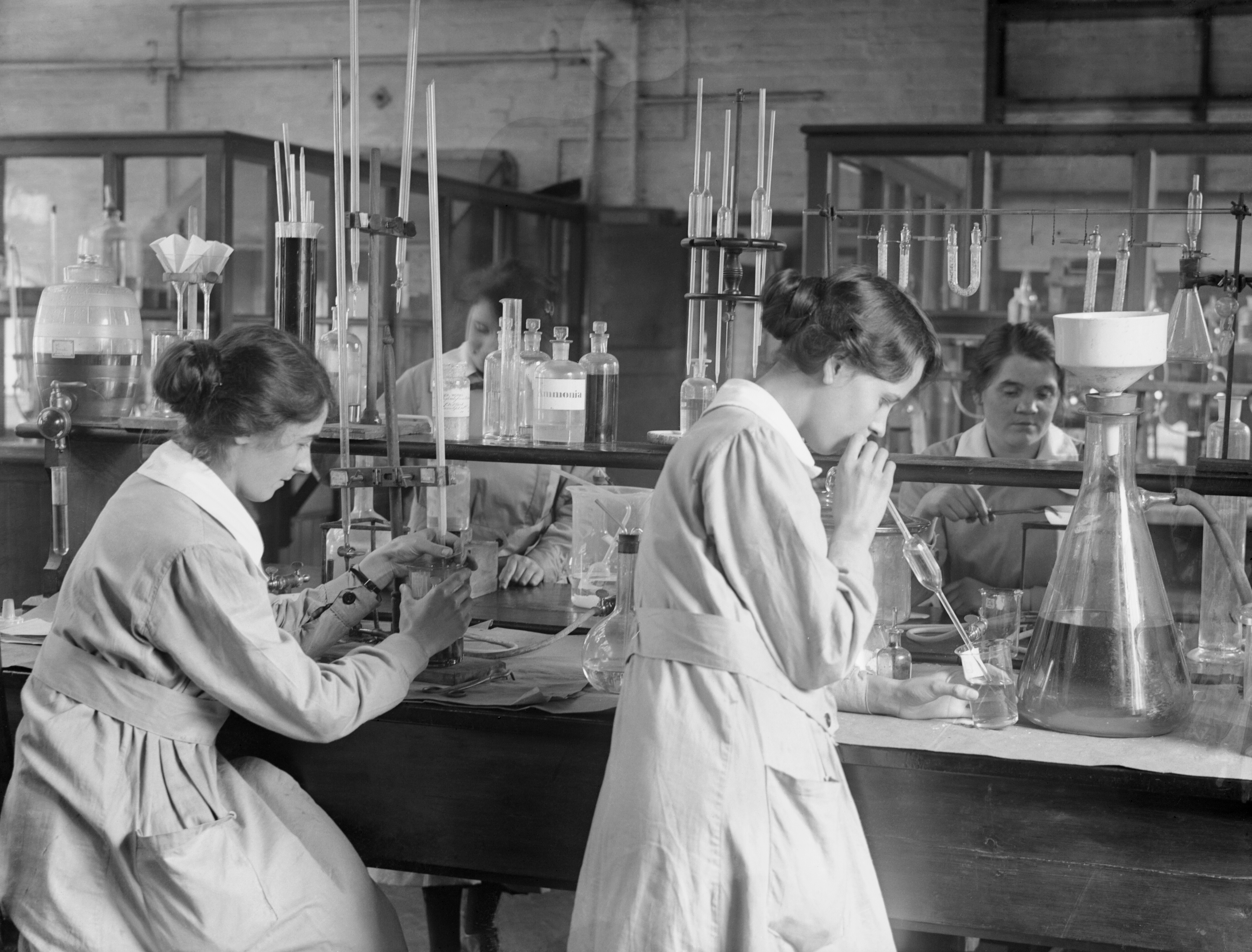
The laboratory of a chemical works of Brunner Mond, Northwich, September 1918

The company was originally formed as a partnership in 1873 by John Brunner and Ludwig Mond. While this partnership recorded a loss of £4,300 during its first year, it was able to turn a profit of £2,045 in the following year. During 1874, they had built Winnington Works in Northwich, Cheshire and produced their first soda ash. The business was incorporated as a limited company in 1881.

Within 20 years the business had become the largest producer of soda ash in the world.

=== 20th century ===
In 1911, it acquired soap and fat manufacturer Joseph Crosfield and Sons and Gossage, another soap company that owned palm plantations. During 1917, the company's trinitrotoluene (TNT) factory in Silvertown, London exploded as a result of a fire.

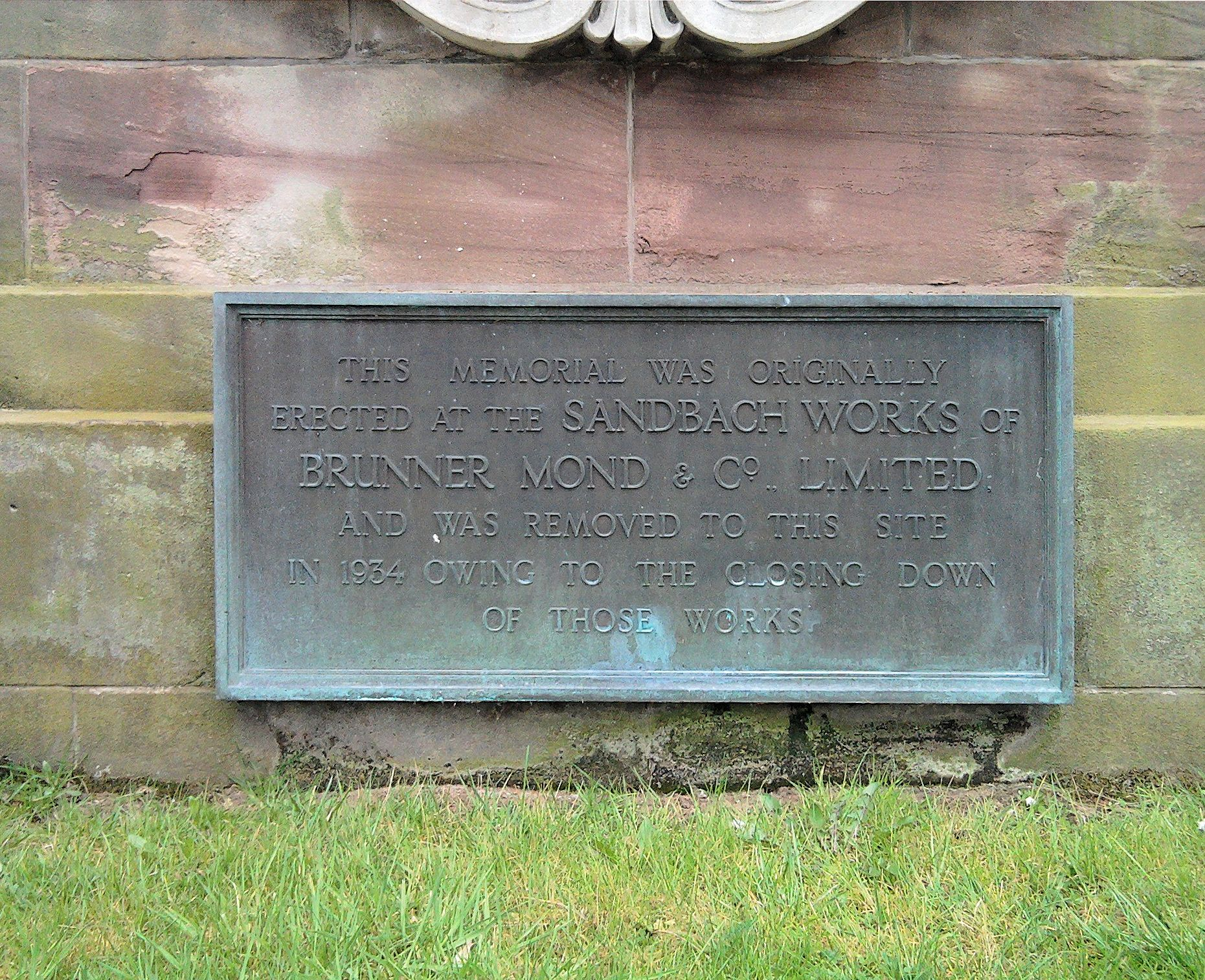
World War I memorial plaque, now at Sandbach Cemetery

During the early twentieth century, the company built managers' and workers' houses in Hartford, Cheshire. In addition to housing, the firm funded schools, a social club, library and guildhall facilities.

In 1919, it sold the soap and chemical businesses to Lever Brothers.

During 1924, Brunner Mond acquired the Magadi Soda Company of Kenya; two years later, Brunner Mond was one of the four main companies – along with British Dyestuffs Corporation, Nobel's Explosives, and the United Alkali Company – which took part in the merger which created the massive industrial combine Imperial Chemical Industries (ICI).

Alfred Mond – son of Ludwig and Chairman of Brunner Mond – was a key figure along with Harry McGowan of Nobel's in bringing this merger about. The Brunner Mond business was absorbed into the Alkali Group of ICI, becoming one of the largest and most successful companies in the world.

The Alkali Group became the Alkali Division in 1951.

The Alkali Division merged with the Runcorn-based General Chemicals Division of the same firm in 1964 to form Mond Division. This became the Soda Ash Products (Group) of ICI Chemicals and Polymers from 1986 until divestment.

In 1991, the British and Kenyan soda ash businesses of ICI were segregated from the rest of the ICI; shortly thereafter, it was demerged from ICI as Brunner Mond Holdings Limited. During 1997, the company was floated on the London Stock Market; one year later, it was bought by private equity firms.

ICI acquired Crosfield and Gossage's chemicals business from Unilever in 1997.

In 1998, this company acquired the soda ash production capabilities of Akzo Nobel in The Netherlands to form Brunner Mond B.V.

=== 21st century ===
In early 2006, following regulatory approval, Brunner Mond B.V. was purchased by Tata Chemicals. Five years later, Brunner Mond was re-branded Tata Chemicals Europe.

Throughout the 2000s and 2010s, energy costs doubled; as soda ash is energy intensive to produce, the firm responded via the purchase of a gas-fired combined heat & power plant from the European utility firm E.ON and the closure of its soda ash plant in Winnington in early 2014.

Furthermore, while soda ash had typically been responsible for generating around 90 percent of the firm's profits, the company opted to pursue diversification; this decision led to the creation of the world’s first standalone sodium bicarbonate plant.

Another step towards diversification came in December 2010 when Brunner Mond B.V. acquired British Salt, a Cheshire-based brine supplier, for around £93 million; this vertical acquisition gave longer term raw commodity price certainty and an economy of transport distance for one of the company's largest factories.

During 2022, Tata Chemicals Europe opened the UK's first industrial-scale carbon capture and usage plant, which can capture 40,000 tonnes of carbon dioxide per annum. That same year, the firm was also reportedly evaluating the potential purchase of a plant in the Netherlands.

In 2024, Tata Chemicals Europe chose to end the production of soda ash at its Lostock site in favour of a new facility (built at a cost of £60 million) in Northwich; this closure also caused the neighbouring Imerys Winnofil plant which relies on raw materials from Tata Chemicals Europe to also cease production in early 2025. This restructuring of the business coincided with the declining value for soda ash.

In September 2026 Tata Chemicals was ordered out of Kenya by Kenya’s president, William Ruto.

== See also ==
- Solvay process
- Silvertown explosion
- Mond gas
- Timeline of hydrogen technologies
- Ludwig Mond Award
- Melchett Medal
- Baron Melchett
- Robert Mond
