= Henriette Hertz =

German philanthropist and art collector (1846–1913)

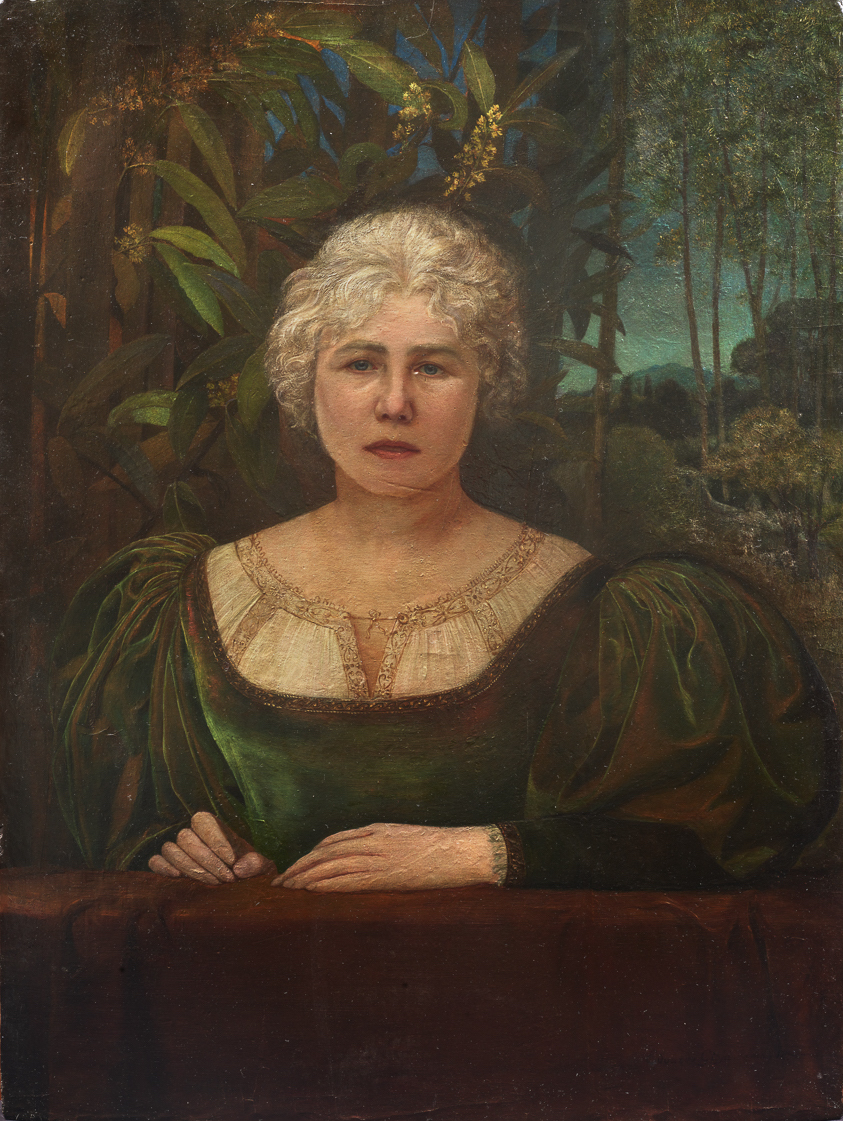
Henriette Hertz painted by Edoardo Gioja

Henriette Hertz (6 January 1846, Cologne – 9 April 1913, Rome) was a German-born philanthropist and art collector. She donated the Palazzo Zuccari to house the Bibliotheca Hertziana in 1912.

== Early life ==
Hertz attended school in Cologne, where her family had settled in 1844. Henriette was the fourth child, the eldest girl, of seventeen children, of which seven survived infancy. She spent her school years studying painting and the history of art. In 1871, Hertz, who had been born Jewish, converted to Protestantism.

In 1881 she lived for several months with art historians Jean Paul and Louise Marie Richter at their home in Notting Hill. Jean Paul tutored her in art history, and she and Louise became close friends.

== Life in Rome, to 1912 ==
Henriette Hertz is now known mainly through her establishment of the Bibliotheca Hertziana, granted to the Kaiser Wilhelm Institute (KWI) in 1913 (from 1953, the Max Planck Society).

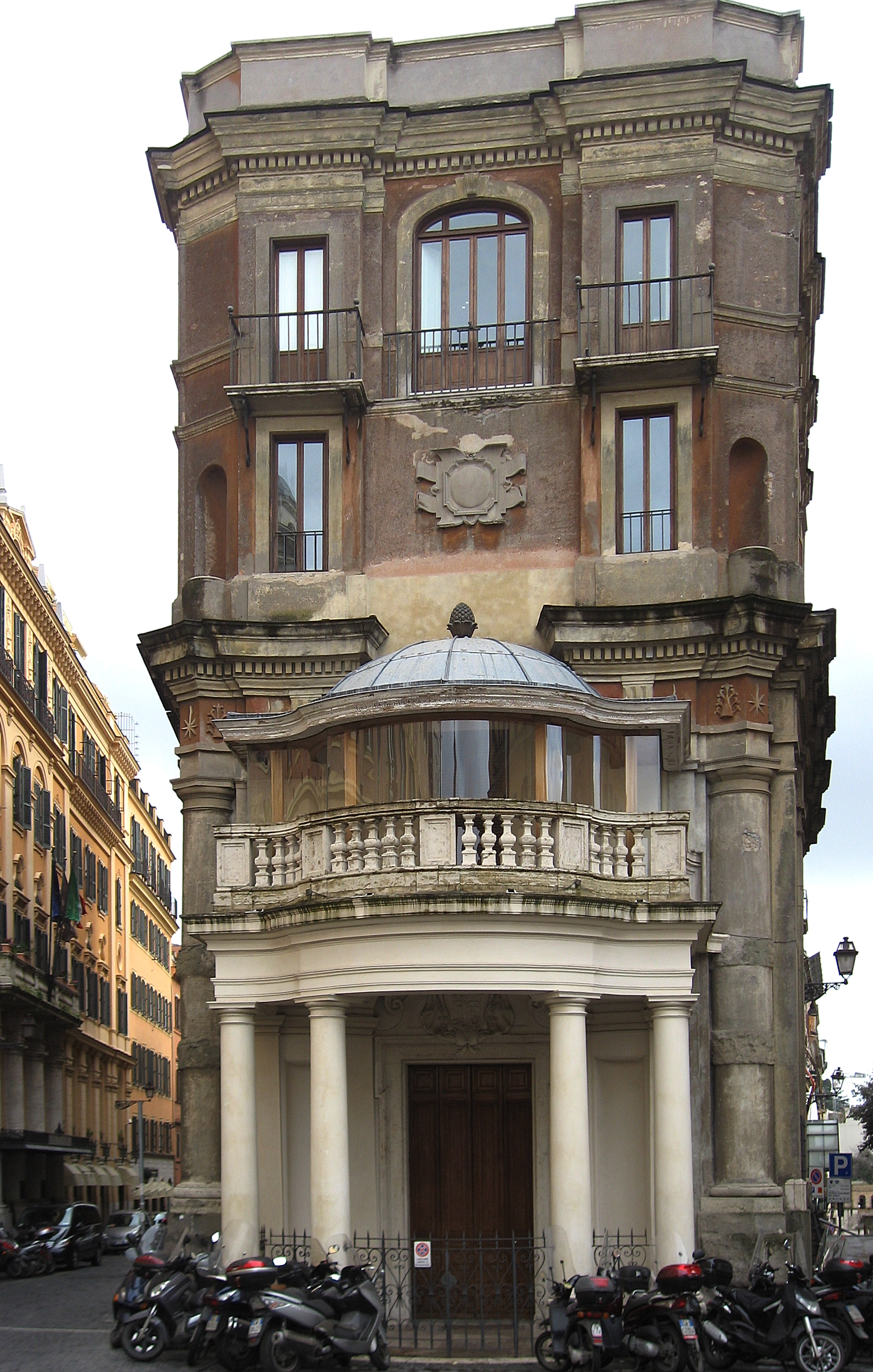
The Palazzo Zuccari in Rome was an "open house"

In 1889 Hertz, with her wealthy friends Frida and Ludwig Mond, rented parts of the Palazzo Zuccari in Rome. Backed by Ludwig Mond's fortune earned in the British soda industry, the Monds and Hertz maintained an "open house" salon in Rome; regular visitors included Gabriele d'Annunzio, the Italian mathematician Pietro Blaserna, Paul Deussen, the writer Olga von Gerstfeldt and the art historian Ernst Steinmann, Wolfgang Helbig, Theodor Mommsen, Giovanni Morelli, and the violinist Teresina Tua, a/k/a Teresa Tua. In 1904, the Palazzo was purchased in Hertz's name, along with an adjoining building, the Casa dei Preti. With the support of Frida Mond and Steinmann, Hertz began to collect books on Italian art.

During the ensuing years (1904–1912), Hertz collected the core of a research library focused upon the art of Italy, and particularly of Rome. Extensive re-modelling of the palazzetto enabled the ground floor to be used for the library, which was installed in the winter of 1910–1911. The Sala di Disegno in the palazzetto has retained its original early twentieth-century furnishings, and was one of the five rooms originally used for the library. Despite opposition from Paul Fridolin Kehr, director of the Prussian Historical Institute in Rome, the Bibliotheca Hertziana was gifted to the KWI in 1912 with Ernst Steinmann as its foundation director. The Bibliotheca hosted the tenth International Congress of Art History of 1912, which featured a plenary paper presented by Aby Warburg.

== The Bibliotheca Hertziana and the KWI ==
On 15 January 1913, the Bibliotheca was officially inaugurated. Hertz gave the palazzetto and the entire inventory of its library to the KWI, along with substantial legacies to fund the operation of the institute, and to expand the library.

Hertz died in Rome on 9 April 1913, and was buried in the Cimitero Acattolico. Her tombstone was crafted by the artist Otto Placzek.

== British Academy bequest ==
A bequest from Henriette Hertz to the British Academy established a fund to support three lecture series and to enable the academy to support scholarly research and publication. The Aspects of Art Lectures, first given in 1916, deal with the relation of visual art or music to human culture. The Philosophical Lectures, first given in 1914, were converted into a series of symposia from 1993 to 2001 and then in 2015 the series of single lectures was revived. The Master-Mind Lectures, first delivered in 1916, were "intended to be an appreciation of an individual of ‘genius’, connected with any of the disciplines of the academy." The Master-Mind Lecture series was discontinued after 2017 upon the British Academy's development of a series of events on ‘Thinkers for our time’.
