= Palazzo Zuccari, Florence =

Building in Florence, Italy

Palazzo Zuccari
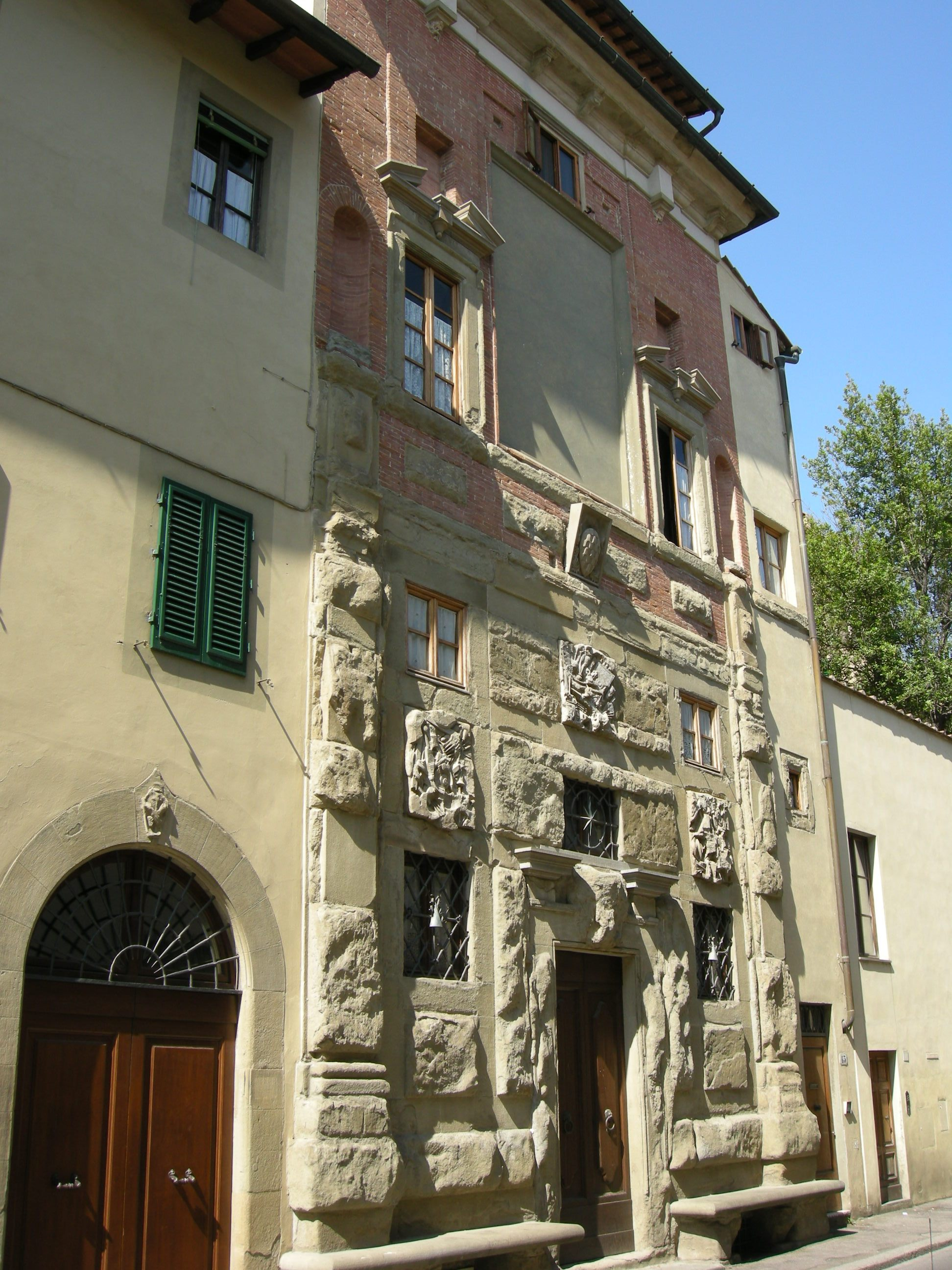
- Facade

General information
- Architectural style: Renaissance
- Location: Via Giusti 43, Florence, Tuscany, Italy
- Coordinates: 43°46′39″N 11°15′47″E
- Construction started: 15th Century-1577

Design and construction
- Architect: Federico Zuccari

Palazzo Zuccari is located at 43 Via Giusti in Florence. The complex also incorporates the House of Andrea del Sarto, with an entrance at 22 Via Gino Capponi. Although the two buildings are connected internally, they are generally treated as separate buildings because of the distinctive Mannerist façade of Palazzo Zuccari, which makes it unique in the Florentine architectural landscape.

== History ==
During the 16th century, the area was home to numerous artists because of its proximity to the Accademia delle Arti del Disegno, which was then located in the Chapel of St Luke within the Basilica della Santissima Annunziata. In addition to Andrea del Sarto, artists associated with the area included Pontormo, who lived on Via della Colonna, Pietro Perugino, and Giuliano da Sangallo and his brother, who resided at the Palazzo Ximenes da Sangallo.

In 1577, Federico Zuccari, who had been commissioned to complete the frescoes of the interior dome of the Florence Cathedral following the death of Giorgio Vasari, purchased the house from the heirs of Andrea del Sarto. In 1578, he acquired the adjacent building and began converting the two properties into his residence and workshop. The project represented an ambitious artistic conception, with the arrangement of the buildings reflecting Zuccari's ideas about the role and status of the artist. Work on the building ceased in 1579, when he abruptly left Florence after completing the cathedral dome frescoes. The unfinished concept was later developed into the more ambitious Palazzo Zuccari in Rome, which became his new residence.

In 1588, the house was leased to the artist Giovanni Battista Paggi, and in 1602, it was sold to him by Zuccari. Having returned to Rome, Zuccari was compelled to part with the Florentine residence due to the heavy financial burden of outfitting his Roman palazzo. Paggi commissioned another fresco for the upper floor.
