= Ludwig Mond =

British chemist and businessman (1839–1909)

Ludwig Mond FRS
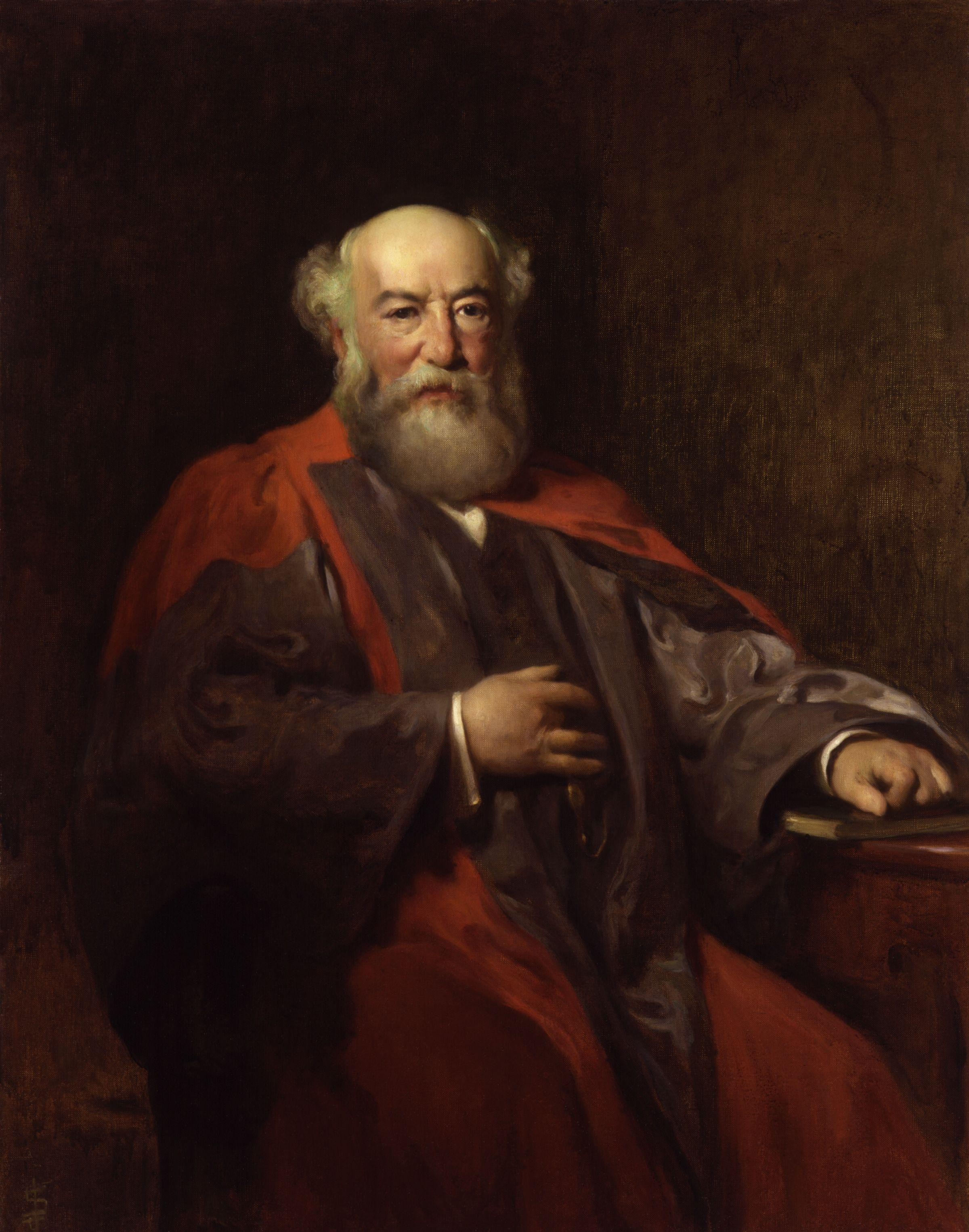
- Portrait of Ludwig Mond by Solomon Joseph Solomon, circa 1909
- Born: 7 March 1839; Kassel, Hesse-Kassel, German Confederation
- Died: 11 December 1909 (aged 70); Regent's Park, London, England
- Education: University of Marburg; University of Heidelberg
- Known for: Commercial use of the Solvay process Discovery of nickel carbonyl Mond gas Mond process
- Spouse: Frida Löwenthal
- Children: Robert Mond; Alfred Mond, 1st Baron Melchett
- Awards: Grand cordon of the Order of the Crown of Italy; Fellow of the Royal Society (1891)
- Scientific career
- Fields: Chemist
- Workplaces: Brunner Mond & Company; Mond Nickel Company
- Doctoral advisor: Hermann Kolbe; Robert Bunsen

Ludwig Mond FRS (7 March 1839 – 11 December 1909) was a German-born British chemist and industrialist. He discovered an important, previously unknown, class of compounds called metal carbonyls.

== Education and career ==
Ludwig Mond was born into a Jewish family in Kassel, Germany. His parents were Meyer Bär (Moritz) Mond and Henrietta Levinsohn. After attending schools in his home town, he studied chemistry at the University of Marburg under Hermann Kolbe and at the University of Heidelberg under Robert Bunsen but he never gained a degree. He then worked in factories in Germany and the Netherlands before coming to England to work at the factory of John Hutchinson & Co in Widnes in 1862. He worked in Utrecht for the firm of P. Smits & de Wolf from 1864 to 1867 and then returned to Widnes. Here he formed a partnership with John Hutchinson and developed a method to recover sulphur from the by-products of the Leblanc process, which was used to manufacture soda ash.

In 1872 Mond got in touch with the Belgian industrialist Ernest Solvay who was developing a better process to manufacture soda ash, the ammonia-soda or Solvay process. The following year he went into partnership with the industrialist John Brunner to work on bringing the process to commercial viability. They established the business of Brunner Mond & Company, building a factory at Winnington, Northwich. Mond solved some of the problems in the process that had made mass production difficult, and by 1880 he had turned it into a commercially sound process. Within 20 years the business had become the largest producer of soda ash in the world.

Mond continued to research new chemical processes. In 1890 he discovered nickel carbonyl, a previously unknown compound and the first-discovered in the class of metal carbonyls, which could be easily decomposed to produce pure nickel from its ores through the Mond process. He founded the Mond Nickel Company to exploit this, and thus was born the Victoria Mine of the Sudbury Basin. Ores from nickel mines in Canada were given preliminary enrichment there and then shipped to Mond's works at Clydach, near Swansea, Wales for final purification.

He was one of the first industrialists of his time who offered his employees paid holidays and fringe-benefits.

== Honours and benefactions ==
Mond supported scientific societies and, with Henry Roscoe, helped to expand the small Lancashire Chemical Society into the nationwide Society of Chemical Industry of which he was elected president in 1888. He was elected to the Royal Society in 1891. and to the Manchester Literary and Philosophical Society on 18 October 1881, Abroad, he was elected to membership of the German Chemical Society, the Società Reale of Naples, and the Prussian Akademie der Wissenschaften. He received honorary doctorates from the universities of Padua, Heidelberg, Manchester and Oxford and was awarded the grand cordon of the Order of the Crown of Italy.

He was a benefactor to a number of scientific organisations including the Royal Society, the Italian Accademia dei Lincei and the Royal Institution of Great Britain. In his will he left bequests to the town of Kassel and to a number of Jewish charities. In his later years he had built up a collection of old master paintings and he left the greater proportion of these to the National Gallery, London. His wife left a large collection of materials relating to German literature to King's College, London.

The Royal Society of Chemistry awards the Ludwig Mond Award in his honour. A statue of him, designed by Édouard Lantéri (1912), stands in front of the former Brunner Mond offices in Winnington, flanked by a statue of Brunner. Another statue of Mond is sited across from the Mond Nickel Works in Clydach, Wales, and is a Grade II listed structure

== Family and personal ==
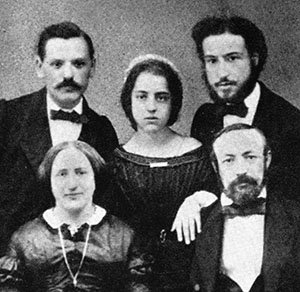
Back row, left to right Leopold Schweich, Frida Löwenthal and Ludwig Mond in 1861, and in front are Frida's parents

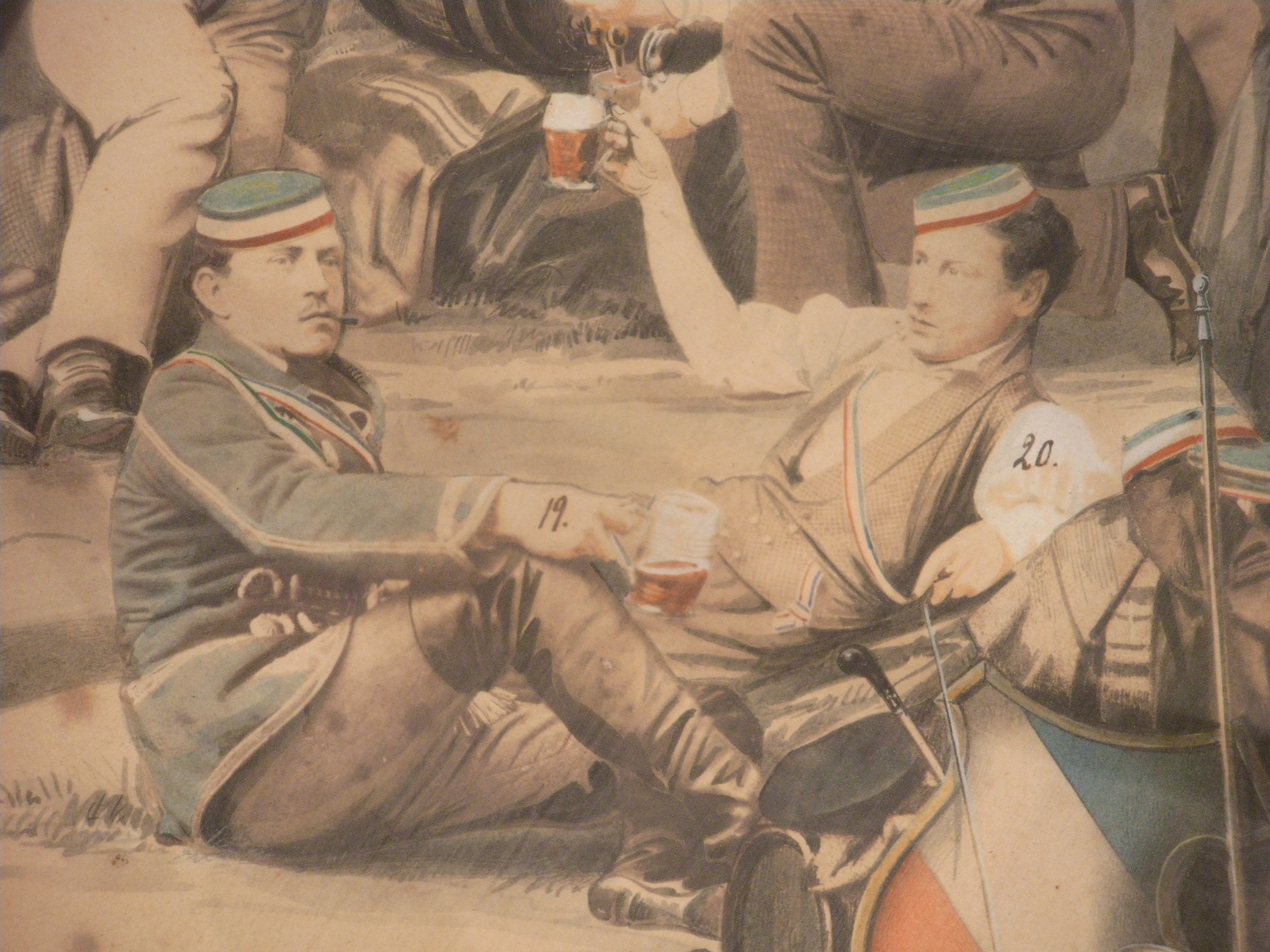
Ludwig Mond (right) as a member of the Corps Rhenania Heidelberg, ca. 1856

In October 1866 Mond married his cousin Frida Löwenthal (1847–1923) in her native town of Cologne. They soon moved to England and had two sons, Robert and Alfred, who was later known as the 1st Lord Melchett. In 1880 he took British nationality. While he was establishing his business the family lived at Winnington and in 1884 they moved to London. From the early 1890s on, he spent most of his winters in Rome at his home there. This home, the Palazzo Zuccari, was first leased and then (1904) bought in the name of his wife's friend Henriette Hertz, who developed it into a study centre for the history of art now called Bibliotheca Hertziana. He died in his London home, 'The Poplars', Avenue Road, near Regent's Park. Although he had never practised any religion he was buried with Jewish rites at St Pancras cemetery where his sons erected a mausoleum. His estate was valued at £1 million.

== See also ==
- Mond gas
- Timeline of hydrogen technologies
- Ludwig Mond Award
- Melchett Medal
