= Palazzo Zuccari, Rome =

Palazzo Zuccari
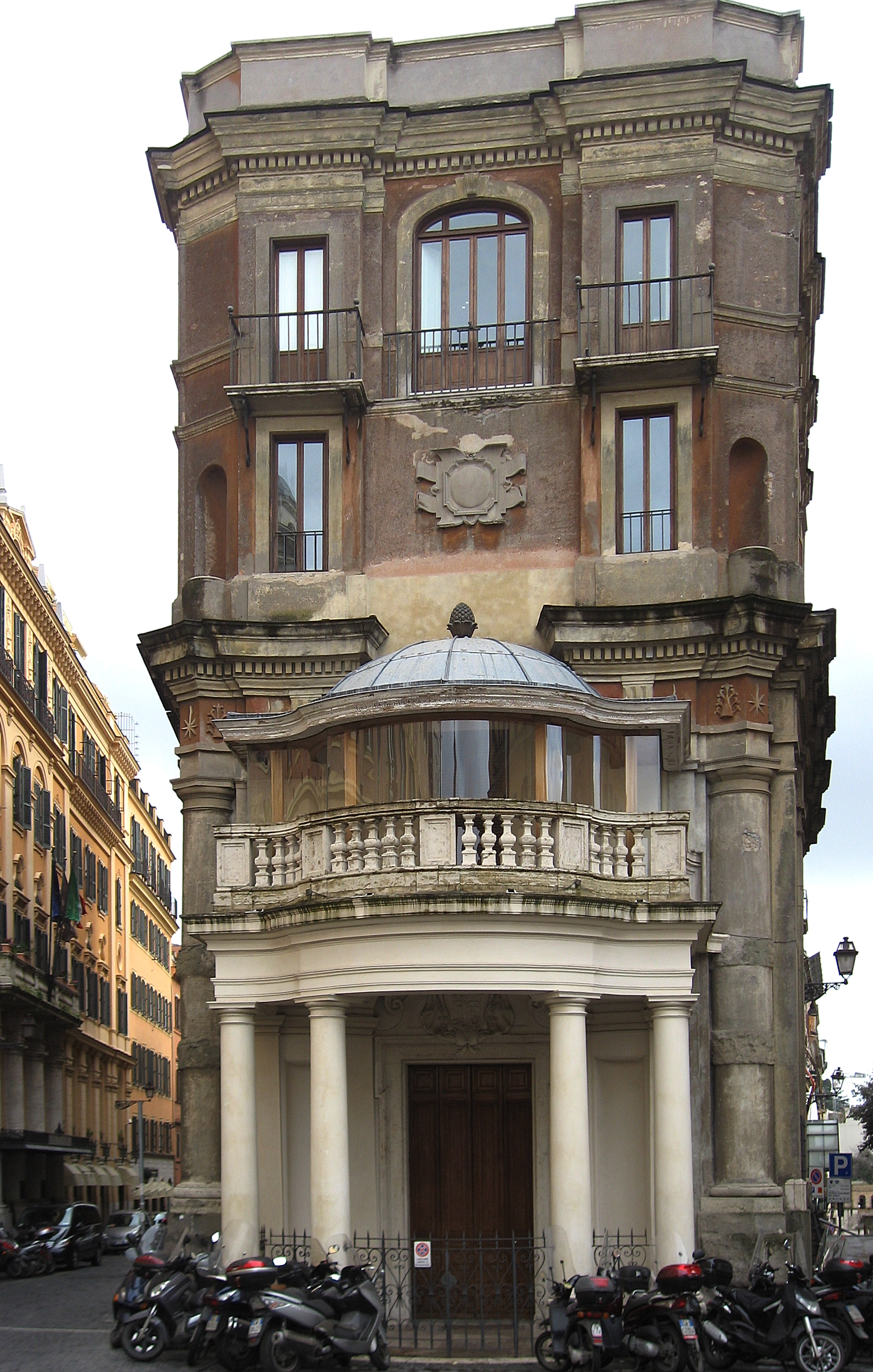
- Facade on the piazza Trinità dei Monti
- Click on the map for a fullscreen view

General information
- Architectural style: Mannerist, Baroque
- Location: Via Gregoriana, 28, Rome, Italy
- Coordinates: 41°54′20″N 12°29′02″E
- Current tenants: Bibliotheca Hertziana
- Construction started: 1590
- Renovated: 2000

Palazzo Zuccari, also called Palazzetto Zuccheri, is a 16th-century palace, located at the crossroads of via Sistina and via Gregoriana, with a Mannerist 16th-century facades on the latter street and a late Baroque facade on the piazza Trinità dei Monti in the Campo Marzio neighborhood of Rome, Italy. Designed by Federico Zuccari, the house is known locally as the "House of Monsters" for the decorations on its doors and windows overlooking the via Gregoriana.

== History ==
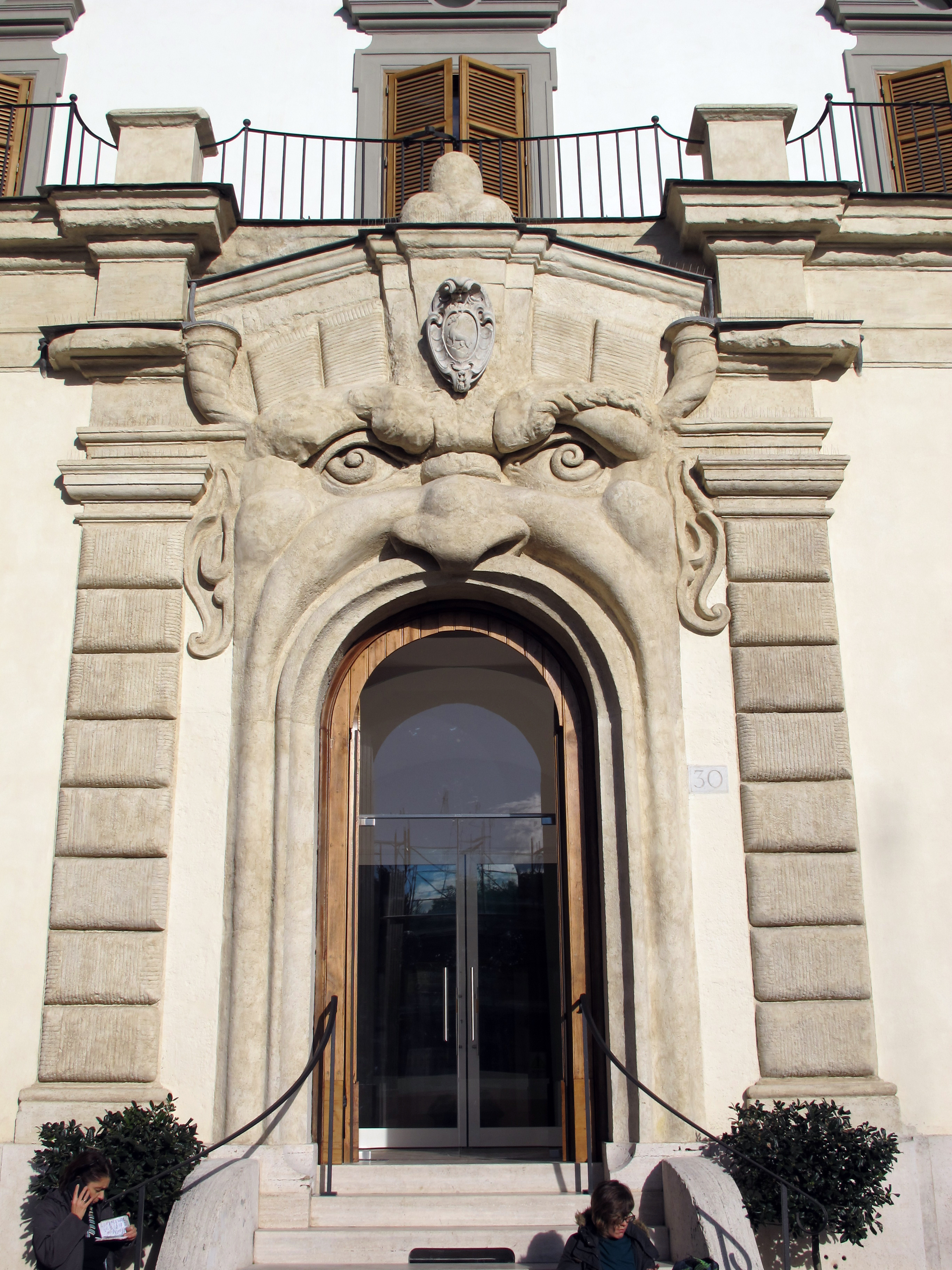
Door of Palazzo Zuccari

The artist Federico Zuccari worked in Rome and Florence (where he designed frescoes for the Florence Cathedral and made a name for himself as an artist. Called back to Urbe for a series of commissions, he decided to create a sumptuous palace that displayed his importance and skill. The project would be more grandiose than his previous work in Florence, the Palazzo Zuccari.

In 1590, Zuccari bought a plot of land near the Trinità dei Monti, and its remains of the Gardens of Lucullus. He then began to construct his artist house. In the end, the grand project would almost ruin him and required a smaller scope. At Zuccari's death in 1609, he left the house to the artists of the Accademia di San Luca. Girolamo Rainaldi then took over work on the complex and gave it the look it would maintain until 1904, when the palace was renovated.

The Zuccari family reacquired the palazzo and held it until the last descendant of the dynasty, the lawyer Federico Zuccari, decided to sell it to Henriette Hertz in the 18th century. From 1702, the palazzo housed the widowed and exiled Queen of Poland, Marie Casimire Louise de La Grange d'Arquien. She funded the construction of a wooden arch over the via Sistina and the facade with a balcony facing the square. At her direction, Filippo Juvarra painted the Polish coat of arms on the facade. She also established a small private theater from 1704 to 1714, which presented music to the Roman nobility by the queen's court musician Domenico Scarlatti.

In 1756, the palazzo became a center for the Christian teaching organization, the De La Salle Brothers, which had previously been housed at the Trinità dei Monti. This use is documented in an engraving by Bartolomeo Pinelli of children leaving the school, accompanied by two brothers of the order.

During the Grand Tour, the palazzo was a visiting spot for artists and scholars like Joshua Reynolds, Johann Joachim Winckelmann, Jacques-Louis David, and painters of the Nazarene movement. It then became the property of Enrichetta Hertz, who gifted the building in turn to the German government. Since 1912, the palazzo has been home to the Bibliotheca Hertziana. In 2000, the restoration of the palazzo's structure and decoration was undertaken by the architect Enrico Da Gai at the direction of the Max Planck Society, which runs the building's library.

== Architecture ==
The Via Gregoriana facade and much of the structure were built starting in 1590 by Zuccari, who frescoed the ground floor. Marie Casimire Louise de La Grange d'Arquien made later modifications, like the Trinità dei Monti facade. The palazzo is known for the odd decorations on its cornicing and windows, which look like monstrous open mouths inspired by the Gardens of Bomarzo and Mannerist architecture. The three mascaron looking out on the via Gregoriana are a major attraction of the palazzo. Zuccari had used similar designs in his illustrations of the gate to hell in Dante's Inferno.

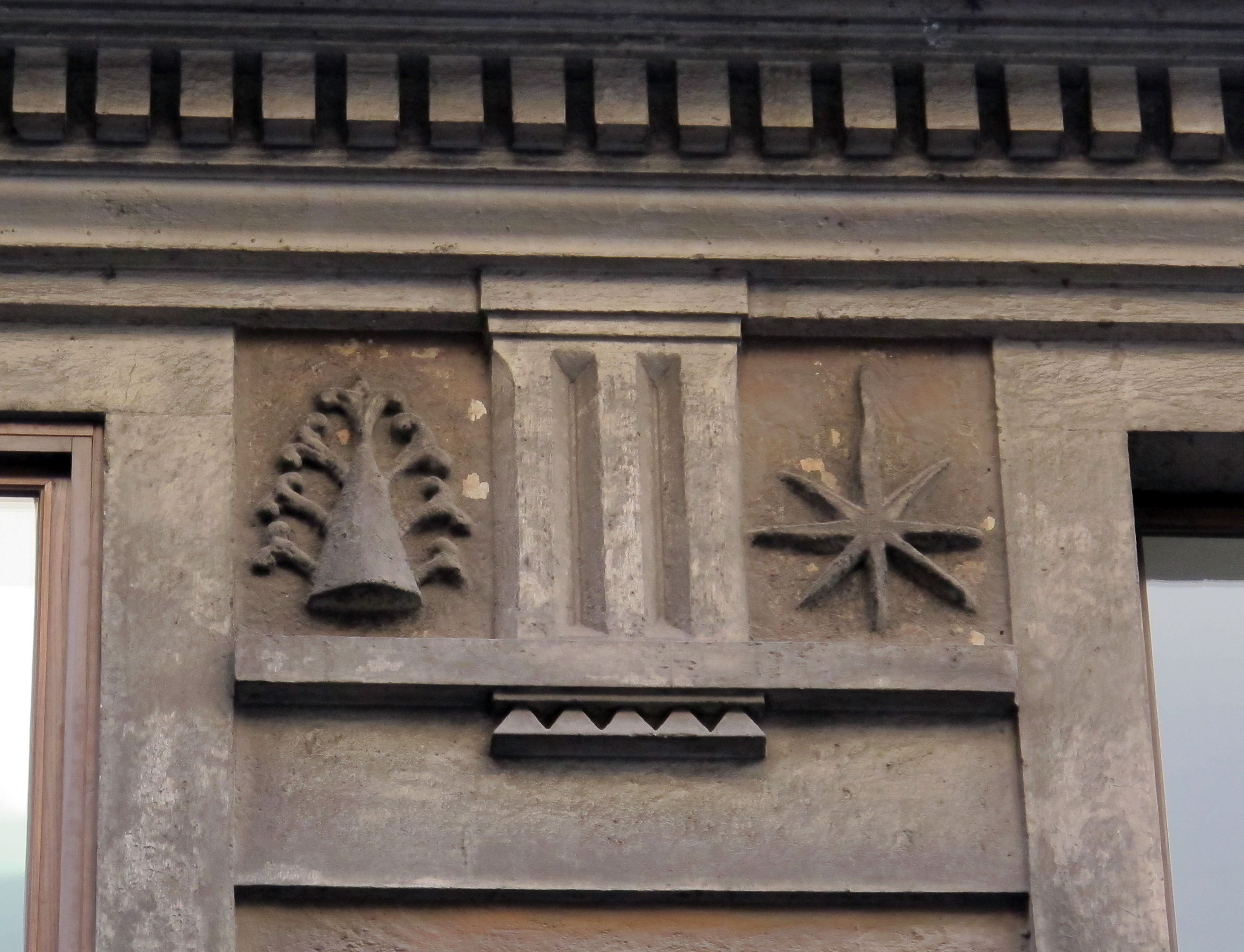
The entablature motif of the Zucchari coat of arms, lumps of sugar, alternated with comets

The palazzo was initially designed in three parts: a studio on the Piazza Trinità dei Monti, the residence facing via Sistina, and the garden with an entrance from via Gregoriana. In contrast with the simplicity of its external appearance, the interior contains illustrious art. The maximum decoration occurs in the staircase, salon, gallery, and garden. The family coat of arms are visible in the fresco of the building's Doric entablature and alternated with comets, an element that reflects the coat of arms. The interior also contains frescoes by Giulio Romano that are modeled after those of the Villa Lante al Gianicolo. Outside, the garden of the palace is rectangular in shape, around 17 meters on each side.

Preceded by Palazzo Wedekind	Landmarks of Rome; Palazzo Zuccari, Rome	Succeeded by Villa Farnesina
