= Berry chantilly cake =

Southern US cake

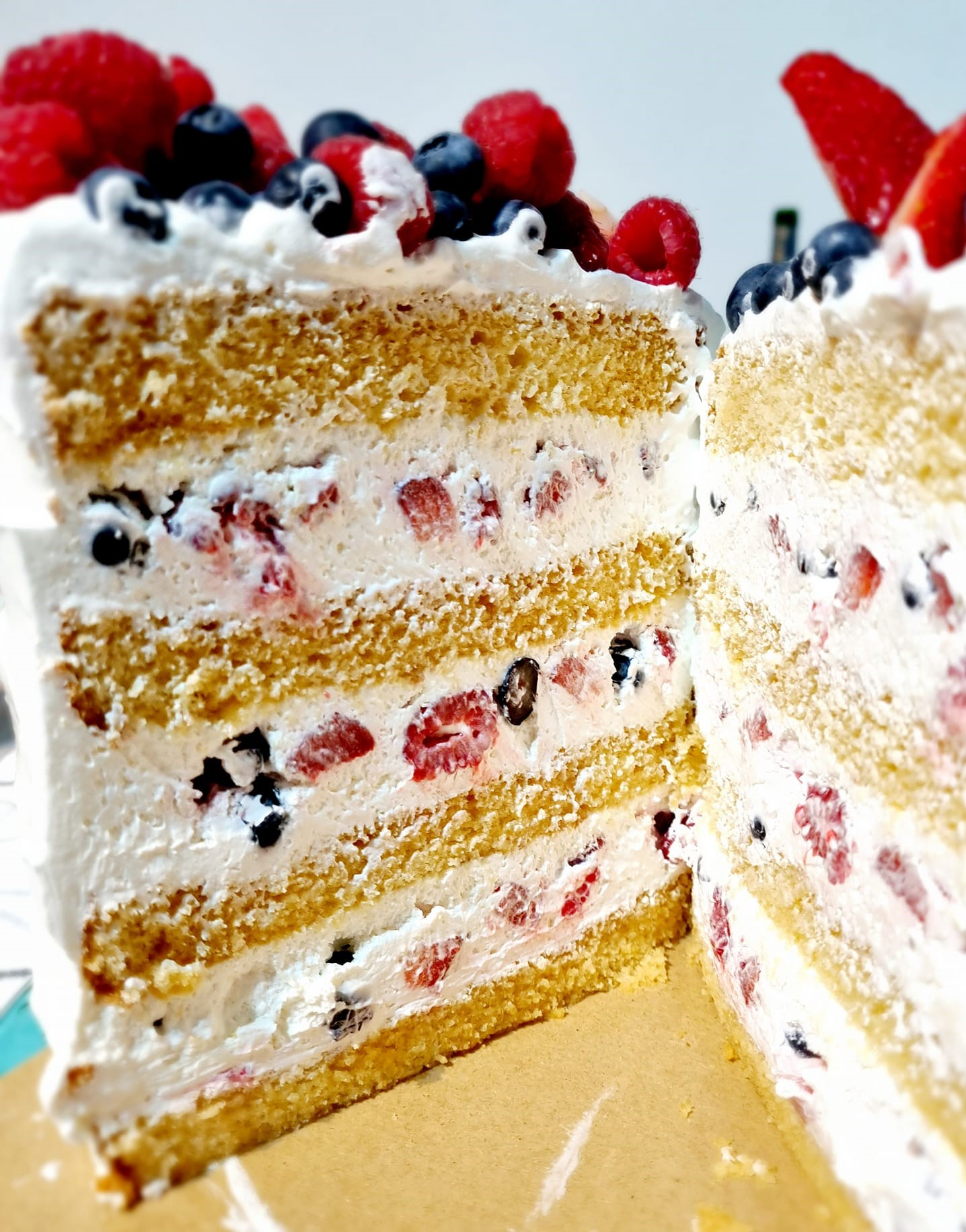
- The cake is composed of yellow sponge layers with berries and sweetened whipped cream.
- Type: Cake
- Place of origin: United States
- Region or state: South

Chantilly cake is a layer cake filled with berries and chantilly cream (a type of sweetened whipped cream). It is popular in the Southern United States.

One well-known version of berry chantilly cake was designed by baker Chaya Conrad while working at a Whole Foods in New Orleans in 2002 or 2005. Her original inspiration was a recipe from her grandmother. Over the years, and while working for different bakeries, Conrad has changed the recipe many times. At Whole Foods, she used a yellow cake, and at the bakery she opened later, she uses a white cake. She includes mascarpone cheese in the whipped cream. The cake has been described as a cult favorite. In 2024, Whole Foods attempted to standardize the cake across all of its stores. The standardized design used berries on top of the cake and jam between the layers, and resulted in complaints from customers who were accustomed to fresh berries in the filling. According to Conrad, the varying prices, seasonal availability, and perishability of the berries can make the original cake design complicated to manage from a business perspective.

A 19th-century variation used a cake made with rice flour, filled it with jam and custard instead of fresh berries, and topped it with chantilly cream. This version was also called trifle cake, after trifle.

== See also ==
- List of desserts
- List of regional dishes of the United States
