= Bibliotheca Hertziana – Max Planck Institute for Art History =

Art library in Italy

Bibliotheca Hertziana Max-Planck-Institut für Kunstgeschichte
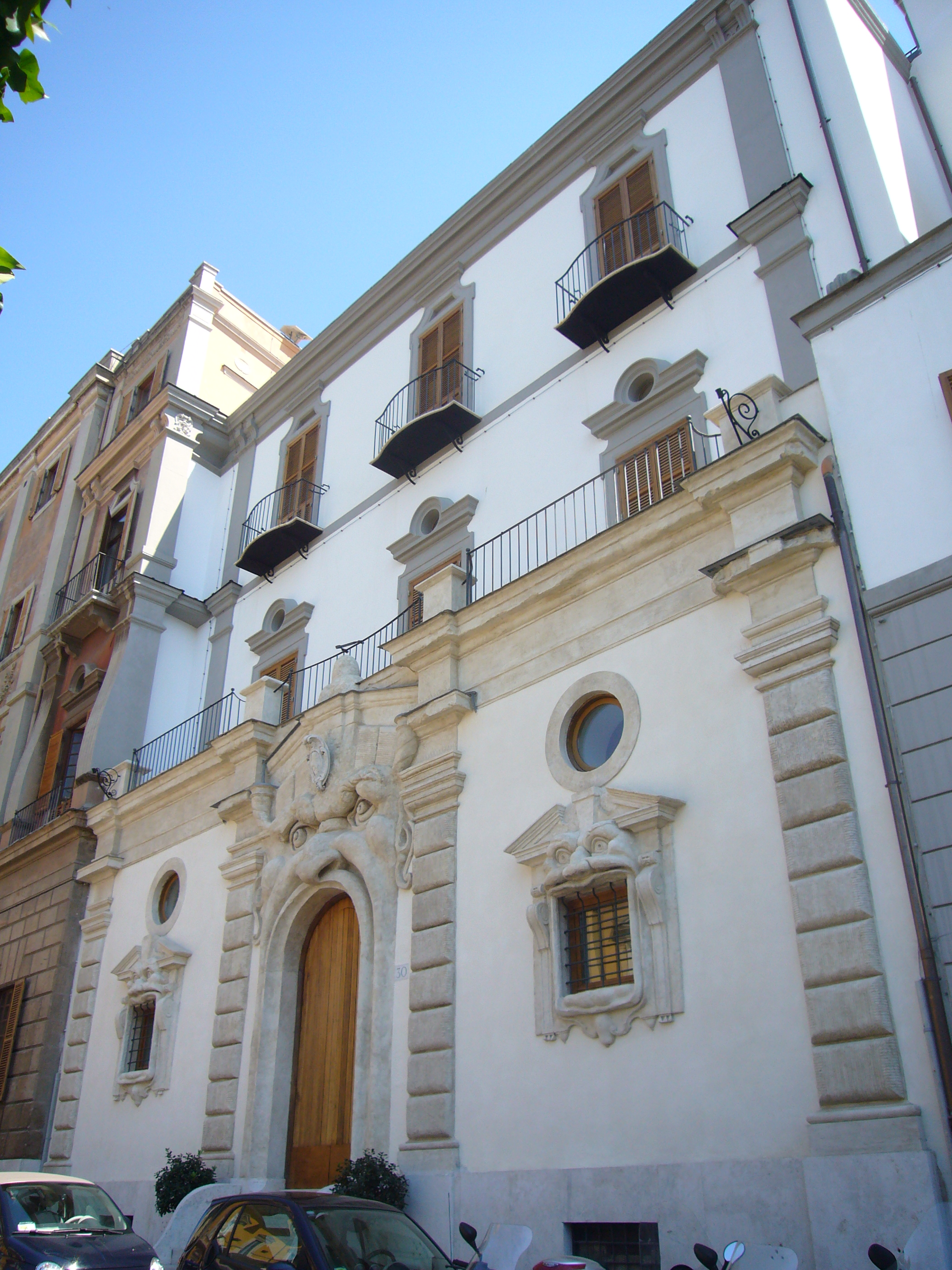
- Bibliotheca Hertziana – Max Planck Institute for Art History
- Founded: 1912
- Founder: Henriette Hertz
- Type: Research institute
- Location: Rome
- Directors: Tanja Michalsky, Tristan Weddigen
- Parent organization: Max Planck Society
- Website: https://www.biblhertz.it/de/home

The Bibliotheca Hertziana – Max Planck Institute for Art History is a German research institute located in Rome, Italy. It was founded by a donation of Henriette Hertz in 1912 as a Kaiser Wilhelm Institute. Of the 84 institutes in the Max Planck Society (Max Planck Gesellschaft), it is one of the few not located in Germany. The institute is situated in the historical centre of Rome near Trinità dei Monti in a cluster of four buildings along the Via Gregoriana: the 16th-century Palazzo Zuccari, the adjacent Palazzo Stroganoff, the Villino Stroganoff across the road and the new library building (completed in 2012) designed by the Spanish architect Juan Navarro Baldeweg.

== Purpose/Activities ==
The Bibliotheca Hertziana was founded in 1913 in Rome as an institute of the Kaiser-Wilhelm-Society for research on Italian art from the period immediately following antiquity, and in particular the Renaissance and the Baroque periods. Today, the Bibliotheca Hertziana – Max Planck Institute for Art History is part of the Human Sciences Section of the Max Planck Society and promotes scientific research in the field of Italian and global history of art and architecture.

Under the present directors Tanja Michalsky and Tristan Weddigen, the research carried out at the Institute has broadened its methodological, historical, and geographical horizons. Tanja Michalsky's department, Cities and Space in Premodernity, focuses on Southern Italy, specifically Naples and the Mediterranean region, and explores historical concepts of space and their transformation in Premodernity. Tristan Weddigen's department, Art of the Modern Age in a Global Context, investigates the global ramifications of Italian art from the Early Modern Period to Modernism, questions materiality and mediality, the intellectual history of the discipline of art history, and on digital art history. The research group Visualizing Science in Media Revolutions, led by Sietske Fransen, Ph.D., investigates how the representation of scientific images has been influenced by media revolutions and the invention of new instruments and techniques. The Lise Meitner Group Decay, Loss, and Conservation in Art History, led by Francesca Borgo, Ph.D., focuses on the decay and loss of artworks and examines how the fragility of objects shapes the way we handle, think, and write about them.

Regular workshops on current projects, lectures, study courses for younger academics as well as symposia and congresses provide opportunities for academic exchange between the members of the institute and guests from outside.

The Bibliotheca Hertziana's holdings of about 340,000 units of specialist literature as well as its collection of more than 1,300,000 photographs, negatives, and digital images focused on the history of Italian art from the Middle Ages to modern times, are accessible through the institute's online catalogues. In addition, innovative database projects on art history were developed early -Cipro, Lineamenta - which are being continued in the various projects of today's Digital Humanities Lab.

== Periodical Publications ==
- Römisches Jahrbuch
- Römische Forschungen
- Römische Studien
- Studi della Bibliotheca Hertziana
- Publications outside the series and in collaboration with other institutions
- Electronic Publications
