= Gary Slater =

British sports journalist

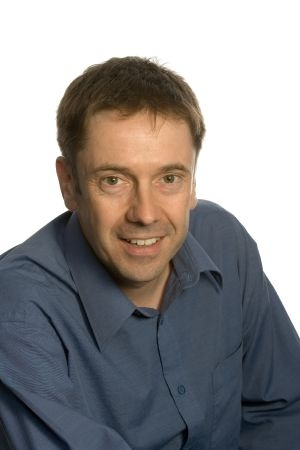
- Born: 15 May 1961 (age 65); Warrington, Lancashire, England
- Occupation: Sports Journalist

Gary Slater (born 15 May 1961) is a British sports journalist, who has worked for The Daily Telegraph and The Times. As a Warrington Wolves historian he has written several books for the popular rugby league football club. In 2014 he was the ghostwriter for an autobiography of Mike Nicholas, a former rugby league footballer.

== Personal life ==
Gary grew up in Penketh, Warrington with three siblings (Mark Slater, Julie Slater and Neil Slater). He studied at Penketh High School then went to university at the Imperial College London. Gary had four sons with his first wife Jane Slater.

== Societies ==
Gary joined the Labour Party (UK) in 1978 and is now a member of the Warrington South CLP. He is also a member of the National Union of Journalists, the Rugby League Writers' Association and Camra (the Campaign for Real Ale).

== Career ==
Gary began work as a journalist in Warrington at the Warrington Guardian where he became deputy sports editor. In 1996 Gary started work for The Daily Telegraph at Canada Place in Canary Wharf, London. He left the Telegraph Media Group in 2017 and started working for The Times. Aside from Gary's work as a journalist, he has also written seven books about the Warrington Wolves Rugby League football club and former players and was part of the team who created the Warrington Wolves Heritage Wall at the Halliwell Jones Stadium in 2013.

== Publications ==
1. Warrington Rugby League Club - Images of Sport (2000)
2. Warrington Rugby League Football Club 100 Greats (2002)
3. So Close to Glory: Warrington Rugby League Football Club 1919 to 1939 (2008)
4. The Warrington Wolves Miscellany (2012)
5. Jack Fish: A Rugby League Superstar (2012)
6. From Swn-Y-Mor to Seattle: Nicko's Rugby Odyssey (2014)
7. Wire till I die: My life in rugby league (2016)
