= Warrington =

Town in Cheshire, England

Coordinates: 53.39°N 2.59°W

- Town
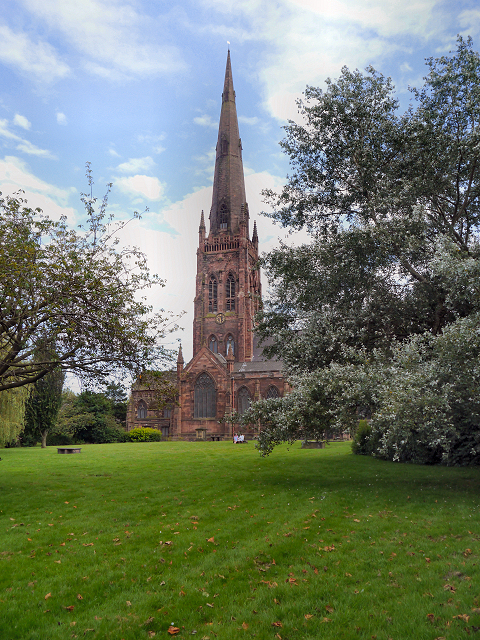
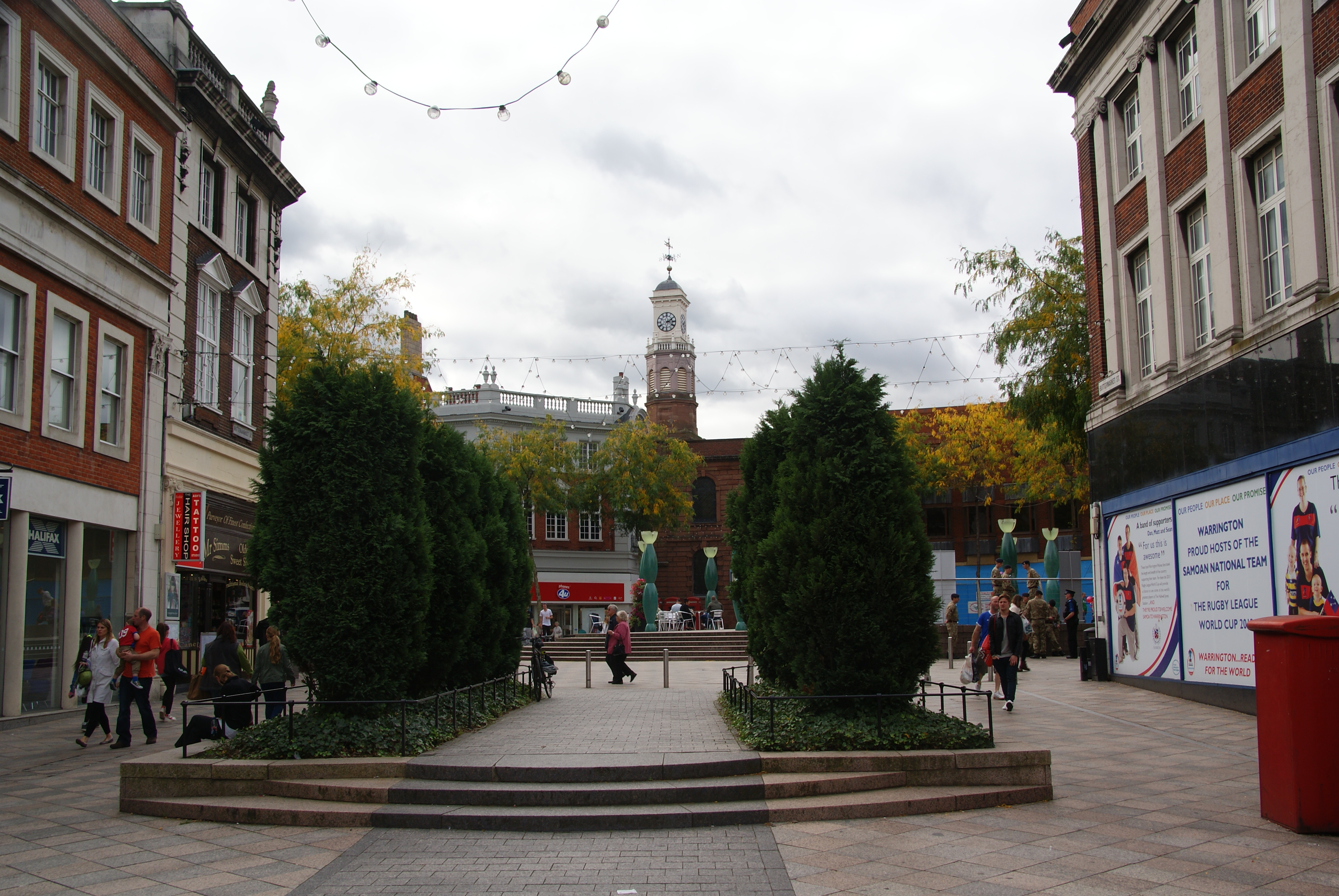
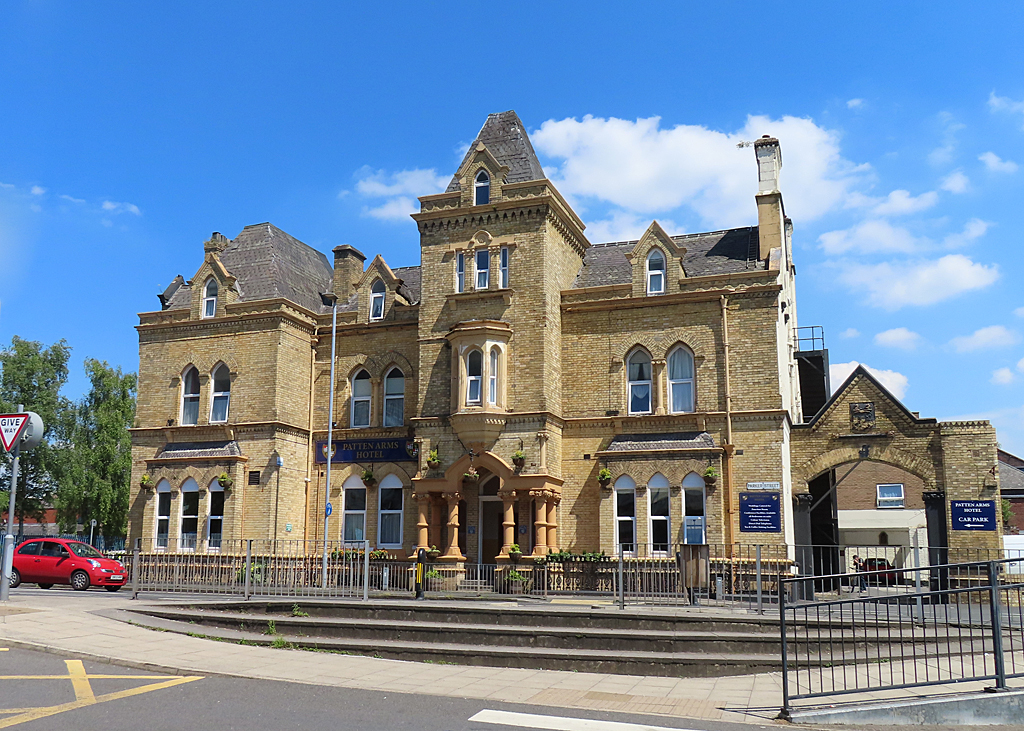
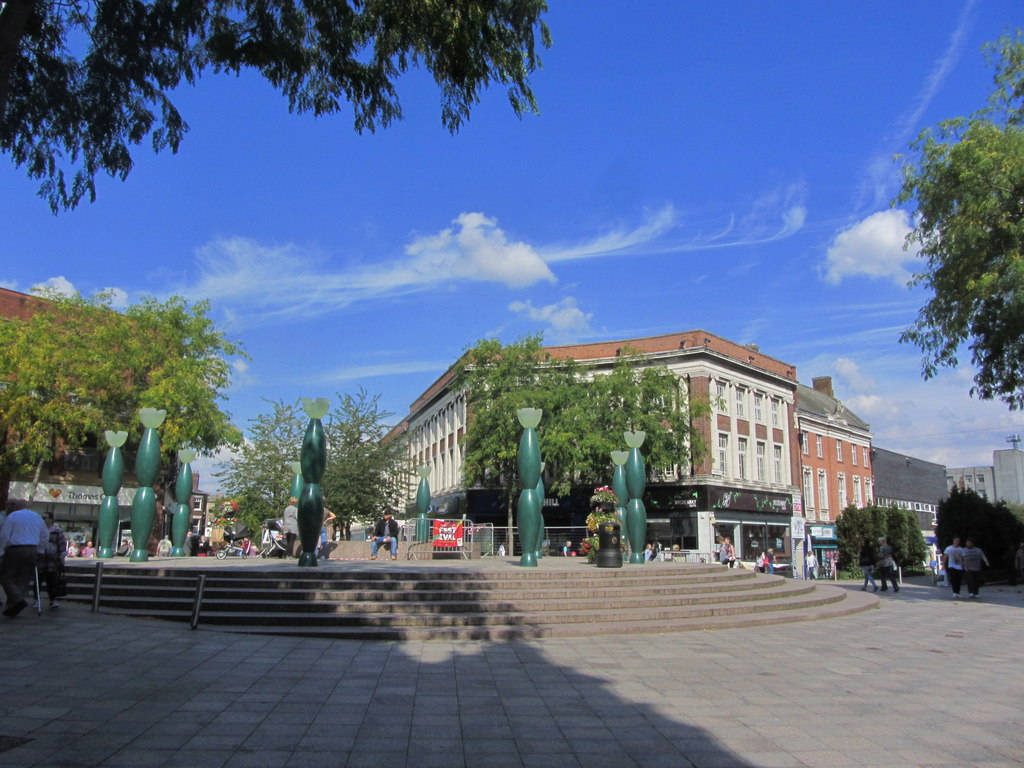
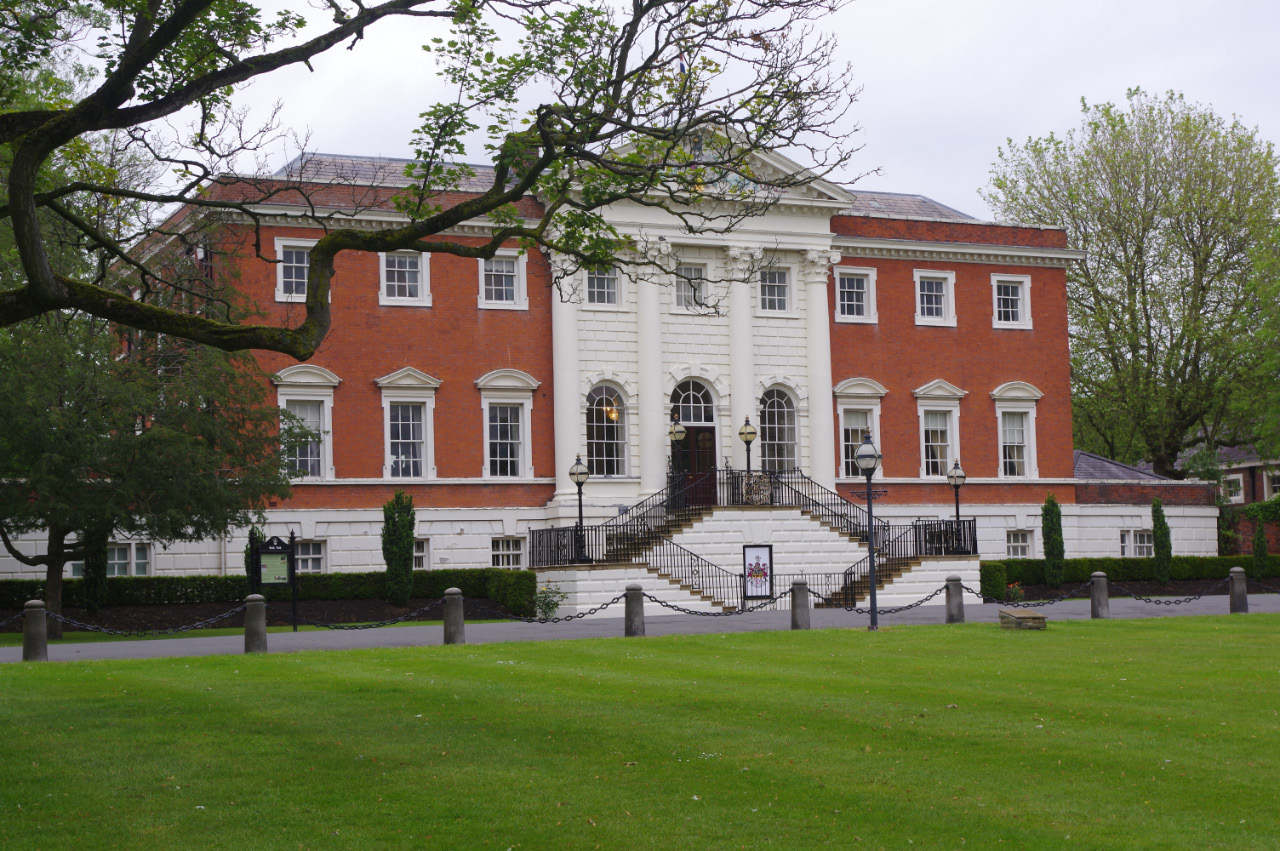
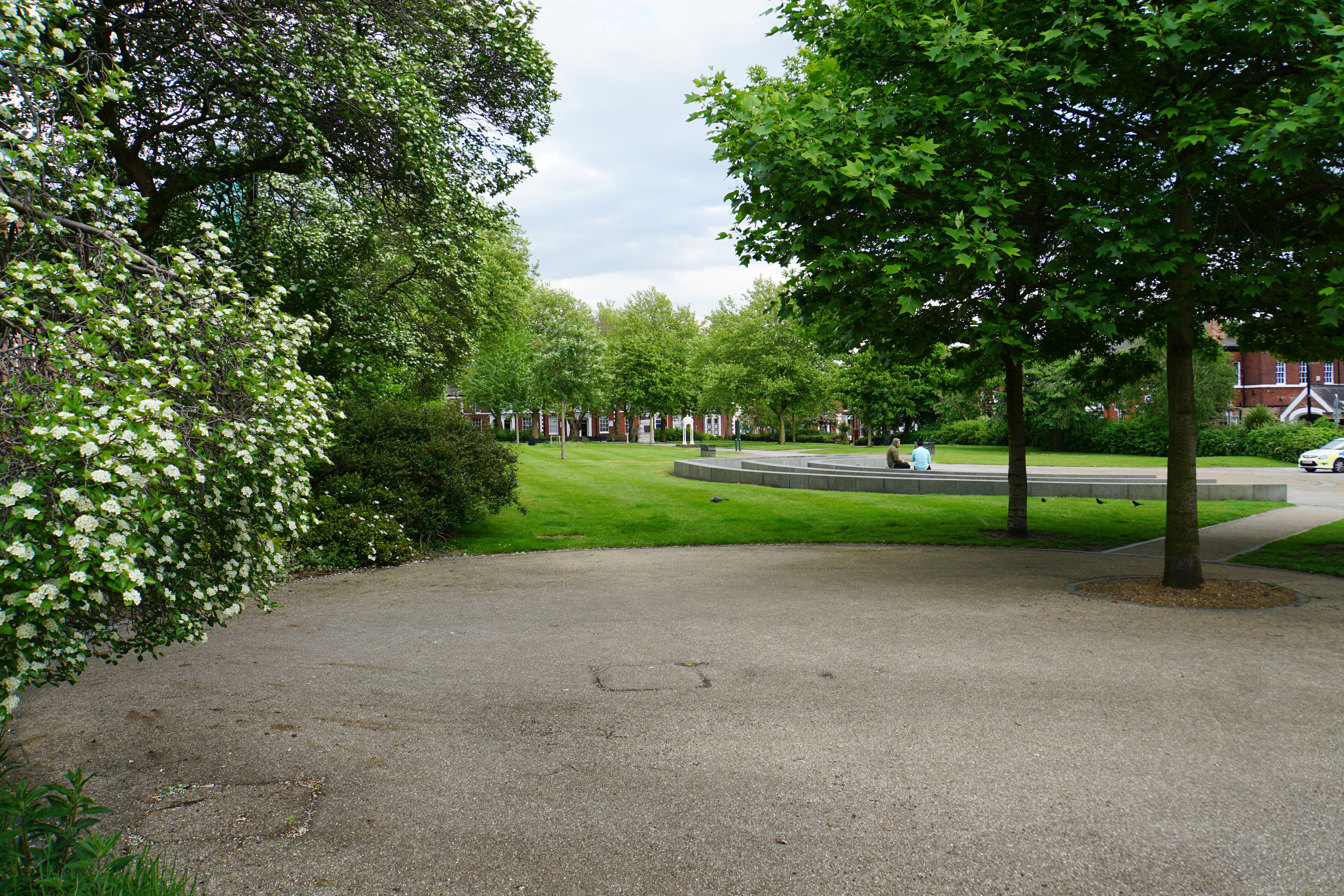
- St Elphin's Church Buttermarket Street Patten's Hotel Market Gate Town Hall Queens Gardens

- Location within Cheshire
- Area: 44.89 km^{2} (17.33 sq mi)
- Population: 211,000
- Unitary authority: Warrington
- Ceremonial county: Cheshire
- Region: North West
- Country: England
- Sovereign state: United Kingdom
- Post town: Warrington
- Postcode district: WA1–WA5
- Dialling code: 01925
- UK Parliament: Warrington North; Warrington South
- Website: warrington.gov.uk

Warrington (/ˈwɒrɪŋtən/) is an industrial town in Cheshire, England. The town is the main settlement of the Borough of Warrington and sits on the banks of the River Mersey, with the town centre and its suburbs north of that river historically having been part of Lancashire. It is 16 miles (26 km) east of Liverpool and the same distance west of Manchester.

The population in 2021 was recorded as 174,970 for the built-up area and 210,900 for the wider borough, the latter being more than double that of 1968 when it became a new town. Warrington is the largest town in the ceremonial county of Cheshire.

Warrington was founded by the Romans at an important crossing place on the River Mersey. A new settlement was established by the Saxon Wærings. By the Middle Ages, Warrington had emerged as a market town at the lowest bridging point of the river. A local tradition of textile and tool production dates from this time.

The expansion and urbanisation of Warrington coincided with the Industrial Revolution, particularly after the Mersey was made navigable in the 18th century. The West Coast Main Line runs north to south through the town, and the Liverpool to Manchester railway (the Cheshire Lines route) west to east. The Manchester Ship Canal cuts through the south of the borough (west to east). The M6, M56 and M62 motorways form a partial box around the town.

== Toponymy ==
The earliest known appearance of the name is "Weringtun", when before the Norman Conquest it was the head of a hundred. An entry in the Domesday Book in AD 1086 named it as "Wallintun". The root is likely the Old English word waru – meaning "those that care for, watch, guard, protect, or defend." The suffix -ing is a cognate of inge, an ethnonym for the Ingaevones said variously to mean "of Yngvi", "family, people or followers of" or a genitive plural form of an inhabitant appellation. The suffix "ton" is from the Old English word tun meaning "fenced area" or "enclosure".

== History ==
=== Early history ===
Warrington has been a major crossing point on the River Mersey since ancient times and there was a Roman settlement at Wilderspool. Local archaeological evidence indicates that there were also Bronze Age settlements. In medieval times Warrington's importance was as a market town and bridging point of the River Mersey. The first reference to a bridge at Warrington is found in 1285. The origin of the modern town was located in the area around St Elphin's Church, now included in the Church Street Conservation Area, established whilst the main river crossing was via a ford approximately 1 km upriver of Warrington Bridge. Warrington was the first paved town in Lancashire, which took place in 1321.

=== English Civil War ===
Warrington was a fulcrum in the English Civil War. The armies of Oliver Cromwell and the Earl of Derby both stayed near the old town centre (the parish church area). Popular legend has it that Cromwell lodged near the building which survives on Church Street as the Cottage Restaurant. The Marquis of Granby public house bears a plaque stating that the Earl of Derby 'had his quarters near this site'. Dents in the walls of the parish church are rumoured to have been caused by the cannons from the time of the civil war. On 13 August 1651 Warrington was the scene of the last Royalist victory of the civil war when Scots troops under Charles II and David Leslie, Lord Newark, fought Parliamentarians under John Lambert at the Battle of Warrington Bridge.

=== Industrial history ===
The expansion and urbanisation of Warrington largely coincided with the Industrial Revolution, particularly after the Mersey was made navigable in the 18th century. As Britain became industrialised, Warrington embraced the Industrial Revolution, becoming a manufacturing town and a centre of steel (particularly wire), textiles, brewing, tanning and chemical industries. The navigational properties of the River Mersey were improved, canals were built, and the town grew yet more prosperous and popular. When the age of steam came, Warrington naturally welcomed it, both as a means of transport and as a source of power for its mills.

=== Second World War ===
Warrington was the location of the Burtonwood RAF base and Risley Ordnance Factory. During World War II, RAF Burtonwood served as the largest US Army Air Force airfield outside the United States, and was visited by major American celebrities including Humphrey Bogart and Bob Hope who entertained the GIs. The RAF station continued to be used by the USAAF and subsequently USAF as a staging post for men and material until its closure in 1993.

=== Post-war expansion ===
Warrington was designated a new town in 1968 and consequently the population grew in size, with many of the town's new residents moving from Liverpool or Manchester, with the Birchwood area being developed on the former ROF Risley site. New council housing was built for families rehousing from slum clearances in Liverpool or Manchester, while Warrington's new private housing estates also became popular with homeowners.

Heavy industry declined in the 1970s and 1980s but the growth of the new town led to a great increase in employment in light industry, retail, distribution and technology.

=== IRA bombing ===
On 20 March 1993, the Provisional Irish Republican Army (IRA) detonated two bombs in Warrington town centre. The blasts killed two children: three-year-old Johnathan Ball died instantly, and twelve-year-old Tim Parry, from the Great Sankey area, died five days later in hospital. Around 56 other people were injured, four seriously. Their deaths provoked widespread condemnation of the organisation responsible. The blast followed a bomb attack a few weeks earlier on a gas-storage plant in Warrington.

Tim Parry's father, Colin Parry, founded the charity The Tim Parry Johnathan Ball Foundation for Peace (operating from a purpose-built Peace Centre) with the aim of working to reconcile communities in conflict. The centre opened on the seventh anniversary of the bombing, 20 March 2000. He and his family still live in the town. In 2026 the building was converted to a school for children with special educational needs.

=== Other history ===
In 1981, Warrington was the first place to field a candidate for the new Social Democratic Party: former Home Secretary Roy Jenkins stood for Parliament but lost to Labour Party candidate Doug Hoyle by a small number of votes.

There was a RAF training camp at Padgate, a Royal Naval air base at Appleton Thorn (RNAS Stretton) and an army base at the Peninsula Barracks in O'Leary Street. The Territorial Army was based at the Bath Street drill hall until they moved to Peninsula Barracks.

In October 1987, Swedish home products retailer IKEA opened its first British store in the Burtonwood area of the town, bringing more than 200 retail jobs to the area.

== Governance ==
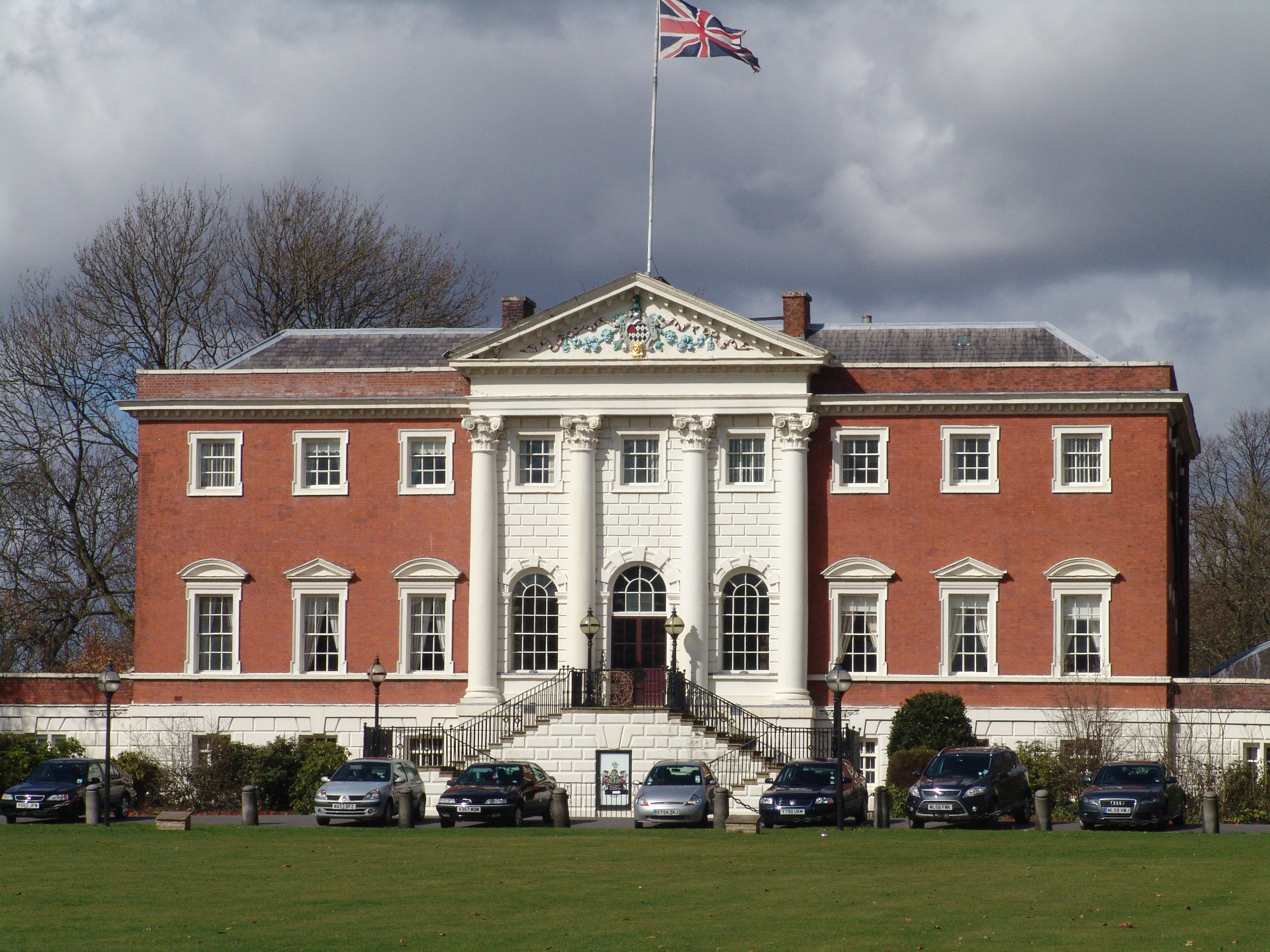
Warrington Town Hall

The modern Borough of Warrington was formed in 1974 by the amalgamation of the former County Borough of Warrington with part of the Golborne Urban District (in Lancashire), the Lymm Urban District (in Cheshire), part of the Runcorn Rural District (in Cheshire), the Warrington Rural District (in Lancashire) and part of a single parish within the Whiston Rural District (in Lancashire) within the designated area for Warrington New Town. It covers the town and surrounding areas, and is administered by Warrington Borough Council, which is a unitary authority (a district council which also performs the functions of a county council). The central part of the modern borough, corresponding to the pre-1974 borough boundaries, is an unparished area; the rest of the borough is covered by civil parishes, which form a second tier of local government for their areas. The borough council has its main offices at 1 Time Square in the town.

=== National representation ===
At Westminster, Warrington is represented by two MPs: Charlotte Nichols represents Warrington North, and Sarah Hall represents Warrington South. Both are Labour MPs.

=== Administrative history ===
Warrington was an ancient parish comprising five townships, being Burtonwood, Poulton-with-Fearnhead, Rixton-with-Glazebrook, Woolston-with-Martinscroft and a Warrington township covering the town itself and adjoining areas. The parish was part of the West Derby Hundred of Lancashire, and the River Mersey formed the county boundary. The land on the south bank of the river was in the township of Latchford, in the parish of Grappenhall in Cheshire. From the 17th century onwards, parishes were gradually given various civil functions under the poor laws, in addition to their original ecclesiastical functions. In some cases, including Warrington, the civil functions were exercised by each township separately rather than the parish as a whole. In 1866, the legal definition of 'parish' was changed to be the areas used for administering the poor laws, and so each of the five townships of the old Warrington parish became a separate civil parish.

In 1813 improvement commissioners were appointed for the township of Warrington, being the town's first form of urban local government; prior to that the town was governed by its vestry and manorial courts. The town was incorporated as a municipal borough by a royal charter dated 3 April 1847. The borough boundaries differed from the township in some areas: more rural parts of the Warrington township were excluded from the borough, whereas the built-up parts of Latchford on the south bank of the Mersey in Cheshire were included within the borough.

From 1847 until 1889 the borough straddled Lancashire and Cheshire. In 1889 boroughs which straddled county boundaries were placed entirely in the county which had the majority of the population, and so the part of the borough south of the Mersey was transferred from Cheshire to Lancashire. The borough boundaries were subsequently enlarged on several occasions, notably in 1890, 1933 and 1954.

The town had its own police force from 1847 to 1969.

Warrington acquired county borough status in 1900 after its population exceeded the 50,000 threshold for such boroughs. The borough council therefore took over county-level services from Lancashire County Council, and until 1974 the borough was known as the County Borough of Warrington. As part of proposed local government reforms of England, in 1969 the Redcliffe-Maud Report suggested incorporating Warrington into either the new Merseyside or Greater Manchester metropolitan counties. Lobbying by the borough council averted this. Instead, under the local government reforms of 1974, an enlarged borough of Warrington was created, incorporating Lymm Urban District and part of Runcorn Rural District from Cheshire, and part of Warrington Rural District. The enlarged borough was placed in Cheshire (the creation of Greater Manchester and Merseyside having separated Warrington from the remainder of Lancashire) with county-level functions provided by Cheshire County Council.

On 1 April 1998, Warrington Borough Council became a unitary authority, taking over county-level functions from Cheshire County Council. The borough is still served by Cheshire Police and Cheshire Fire and Rescue Service, and forms part of Cheshire for ceremonial purposes, such as the Lord Lieutenancy. Warrington has applied unsuccessfully for city status, the most recent attempt being after the opening of the Peace Centre as a "City for Peace".

== Geography ==
=== Climate ===
Warrington has a temperate maritime climate with warm summers and cool winters. Rain is spread across the year, with thunderstorms only usually occurring in the summer months. Summer heat waves are rare but can cause temperatures to exceed 30 °C. Summers are usually snow free and rarely experience high winds. Winters are generally cold, with most days around 0 °C . Moreover, during occasional lengthy cold snaps, night-time temperatures have been known to fall to −12 °C with lying snow lasting for weeks. Ground frost regularly occurs from late October until late March. High winds are common in winter, although rarely above gale force 7.

Climate data for Warrington, United Kingdom (1981–2010)
Month	Jan	Feb	Mar	Apr	May	Jun	Jul	Aug	Sep	Oct	Nov	Dec	Year
Mean daily maximum °C (°F)	6.9 (44.4)	7.2 (45.0)	9.7 (49.5)	12.3 (54.1)	15.9 (60.6)	18.4 (65.1)	20.2 (68.4)	20.1 (68.2)	17.4 (63.3)	13.5 (56.3)	9.6 (49.3)	7.1 (44.8)	13.2 (55.7)
Mean daily minimum °C (°F)	0.8 (33.4)	1.0 (33.8)	2.4 (36.3)	3.6 (38.5)	6.7 (44.1)	9.0 (48.2)	11.7 (53.1)	11.3 (52.3)	9.2 (48.6)	6.7 (44.1)	3.0 (37.4)	0.6 (33.1)	5.5 (41.9)
Average rainfall mm (inches)	81.5 (3.21)	51.5 (2.03)	58.6 (2.31)	61.4 (2.42)	54.8 (2.16)	64.5 (2.54)	67.3 (2.65)	79.4 (3.13)	79.6 (3.13)	98.8 (3.89)	79.9 (3.15)	89.8 (3.54)	867.1 (34.16)
Mean monthly sunshine hours	43.8	69.8	97.7	137.1	185.9	163.7	171.7	161.6	133.3	89.7	63.7	54.6	1,372.6

=== Green belt ===
Warrington is within a green belt region that extends into the wider surrounding counties, and is in place to reduce urban sprawl, prevent the towns in the nearby Manchester and Merseyside conurbations from further convergence, protect the identity of outlying communities, encourage brownfield reuse, and preserve nearby countryside. This is achieved by restricting inappropriate development within the designated areas, and imposing stricter conditions on permitted building.

The main urban area and larger villages of the borough are exempt from the green belt area, but surrounding smaller villages, hamlets and rural areas such as Rixton, Glazebrook, Higher Walton, Kenyon, Stretton, Hatton, Broomedge are 'washed over' with the designation. The green belt was first drawn up in 1977 under Cheshire County Council, and the size in the borough in 2017 amounted to 11,500 hectares (115 km^{2}; 44 sq mi).

A subsidiary aim of the green belt is to encourage recreation and leisure interests, with rural landscape features and facilities including Walton Hall gardens with zoo and bicycle museum, St Oswald's Church and well, the River Mersey with valley and trail, River Bollin, Manchester Ship Canal, Bridgewater Canal, Appleton Reservoir, numerous playing fields, parks and golf clubs, Cuerdley and Norton marshes, the Trans Pennine Trail, the Mersey Forest project, and Sow Brook.

== Demography ==
Based on ONS statistics

=== Population and ethnicity ===
At the 2011 census, Warrington had a total population of 202,200, of which 49.6% are male and 50.4% are female. The average age of the population is 38.06 years, which is slightly below the regional and national averages. In 2018 it was estimated that the current population of Warrington is 209,500.

In addition to English, a further 36 languages were recorded spoken by more than 0.01% of Warrington's population aged 3 and over in the 2011 census. Those spoken by more than 0.1% were Polish (0.88%), Slovak (0.21%), Urdu (0.14%), Latvian (0.12%), Non Mandarin or Cantonese Chinese (0.12%) and Tagalog/Filipino (0.11%).

There are around 100 churches or other Christian communities, two mosques, and a Sikh temple Guru Nanak Gurdwara which is the only Sikh place of worship in Cheshire.

The most multicultural parts of Warrington are in the town centre, as well as the western and north western suburbs, such as Bewsey and Westbrook. In 2011, the town was 92.9% White British, 2.3% other White, 2.4% Asian and 0.3% Black.

=== Housing and social situation ===
At the 2011 census, the borough of Warrington had 85,100 households. From 2001 data (80,593 households), 76% were owner occupied, 17.6% were rented from the council, 4.8% were rented from other sources and 1.6% of houses had residents who lived rent free. Warrington has a population density of 10.7 residents per hectare, and 31.9% of residents describe the borough as a comfortably well-off area. 4.3% of households are deemed overcrowded. Of the total population, 5.8% of residents are on some form of benefits.

=== Employment and education ===
At 2005, the borough of Warrington had 63.6% employment, with only 2.9% of all economically active people unemployed – although a substantial rise began in 2008 due to the recession. 2.3% of the population are students in full-time higher education. 31.1% of the total population are economically inactive (due to retirement, ill health, or full-time carer status). According to borough statistics, of the population (in the Borough of Warrington in 2005). 26.9% are unqualified (either due to leaving school early or failing the end of school examinations). 46.4% have level 1 or 2 qualifications (level 1 being 1+ GCSE (A*-G) or "O" Level or equivalent, level 2 being 5+ GCSEs (grades A-C), 1+'A' levels/ AS levels (A-E) or equivalent). 19.7% have received level 3+ qualifications (meaning 2+ A-levels (A-E), 4+ AS-levels (A-E) or equivalent minimum).

== Economy ==
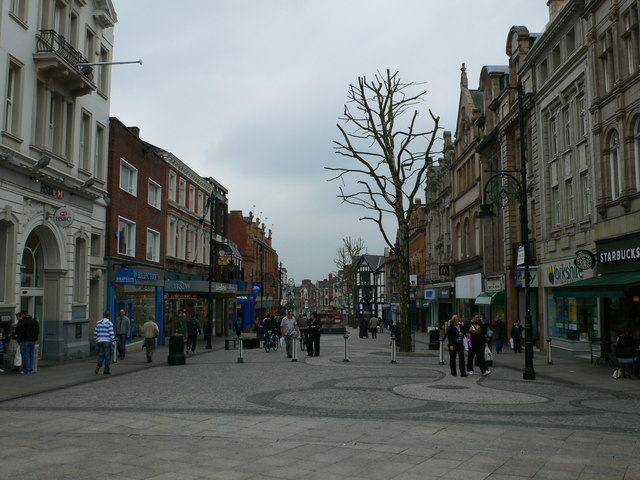
Bridge Street, one of the main shopping streets in Warrington

This is a chart of trend of regional gross value added of Halton and Warrington at current basic prices.

Year	Regional gross value added (Note: Includes hunting and forestry.)	Agriculture (Note: Includes energy and construction.)	Industry (Note: Includes financial intermediation services indirectly measured.)	Services (Note: Components may not sum to totals due to rounding.)
1995	3,636	14	1,361	2,261
2000	4,768	10	1,433	3,324
2003	5,774	18	1,399	4,356

There is a large Unilever factory in Warrington where powder detergents are made. In January 2020, Unilever put the plant under review owing to a fall in demand for washing powder compared with other forms of detergent.

Warrington Council and Warrington & Halton Hospitals NHS Foundation Trust are major employers in the borough.

ESR Technology's main operations are located at Warrington.

=== Retail ===
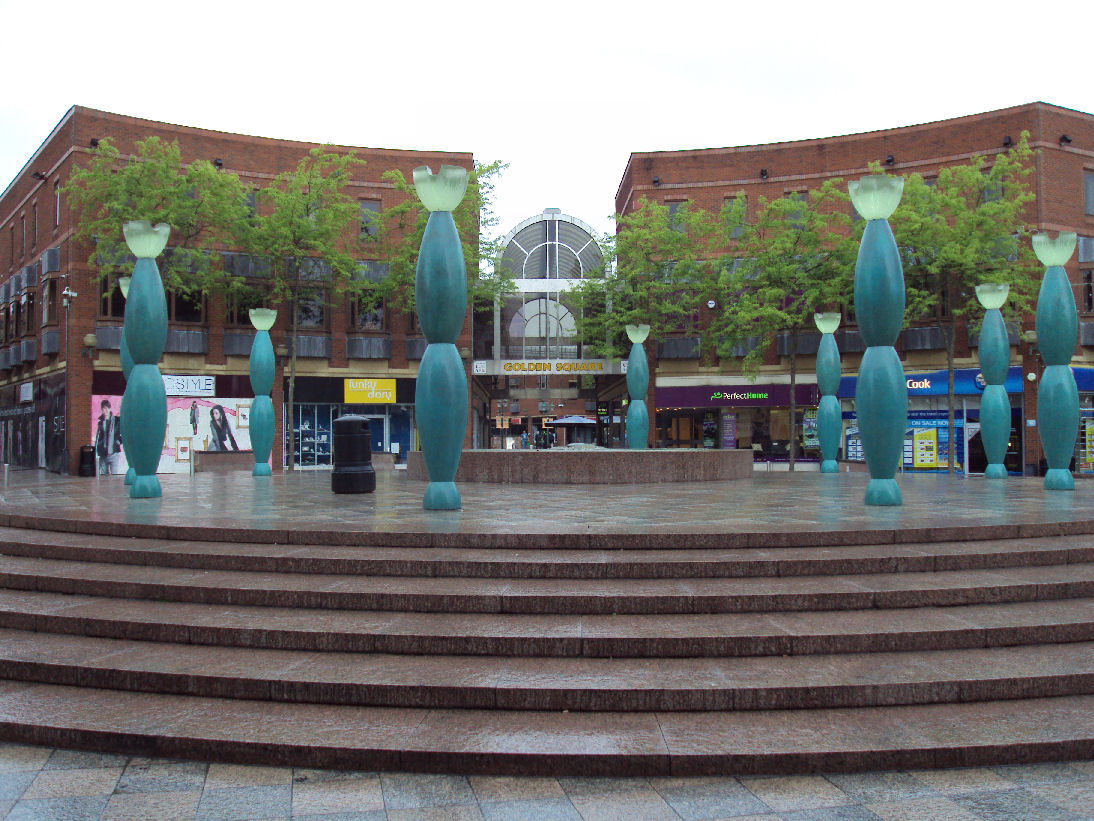
The Skittles

In spite of its proximity to significant retail areas in Manchester, Liverpool, Chester and the out-of-town Trafford Centre, Warrington continues to have one of the larger shopping centres in North West England. Despite the competition, Warrington has seen an increase in its customer trade, due in part to the modernisation of the town centre. The town's main shopping centre, Golden Square, first opened in 1974, which has been extended to include a Primark store, and a new bus station.

The old Cockhedge Textile Mill was demolished and replaced by another shopping mall. The main shopping streets are Buttermarket Street, Horsemarket Street, Sankey Street and Bridge Street. Where these four streets intersect at Market Gate, there is a redevelopment with a large fountain and "guardians" (known locally as "the skittles") designed by Howard Ben Tré. Musical instrument retailer Dawsons Music originates in the town, and was located on Sankey Street from 1898 until 2019. The town also has a large indoor market which was redeveloped as part of the Time Square development which brought the return of a cinema in the town centre along with office space, restaurants, bars and retail opportunities.

The town also has several other small shopping malls located in the town centre and throughout the town such as Hatters Row and Birchwood Mall. IKEA chose Warrington as the location for their first store when they came to the UK; the store is located in the large out-of-town shopping area of Gemini, which is home to one of the largest Marks and Spencer stores in the UK. Nearby to this, there is also an ODEON Luxe cinema, which was refurbished in 2019.

=== Leisure ===
There is ten-pin bowling located in the town centre and at Winwick Quay, and indoor paintball. An indoor karting centre is located near to Bank Quay. Pitch and putt and crazy golf are available at Walton Hall and Gardens. A Laser Quest arena and a snooker club can also be found in Warrington, both located close to the town centre. Gulliver's World theme park is located in Old Hall, Apple Jack's Farm theme park is situated in Stretton.

=== Developments ===
The Omega Development Site close to the M62 on the northern edge of Warrington, on part of the site of the Burtonwood Airbase, was intended to be a major business park but has instead been developed as mainly warehousing with a large residential area.

Other planned developments in Warrington were delayed by the economic climate, but redevelopment of the Time Square area, including a new Market, multi-story car park with around 1,200 spaces, cinema, retail outlets and council offices was completed in 2020 with an estimated cost of £142 million.

Warrington is developing a new Local Plan but plans to build 24,000 new homes were scaled back as government guidance changed. Included in the plans would be a new "Garden City Suburb" in the south of Warrington. The four main areas of growth as outlined in the planning were the waterfront around the River Mersey, the town centre, the Garden City Suburb and south west urban extension.

== Transport ==
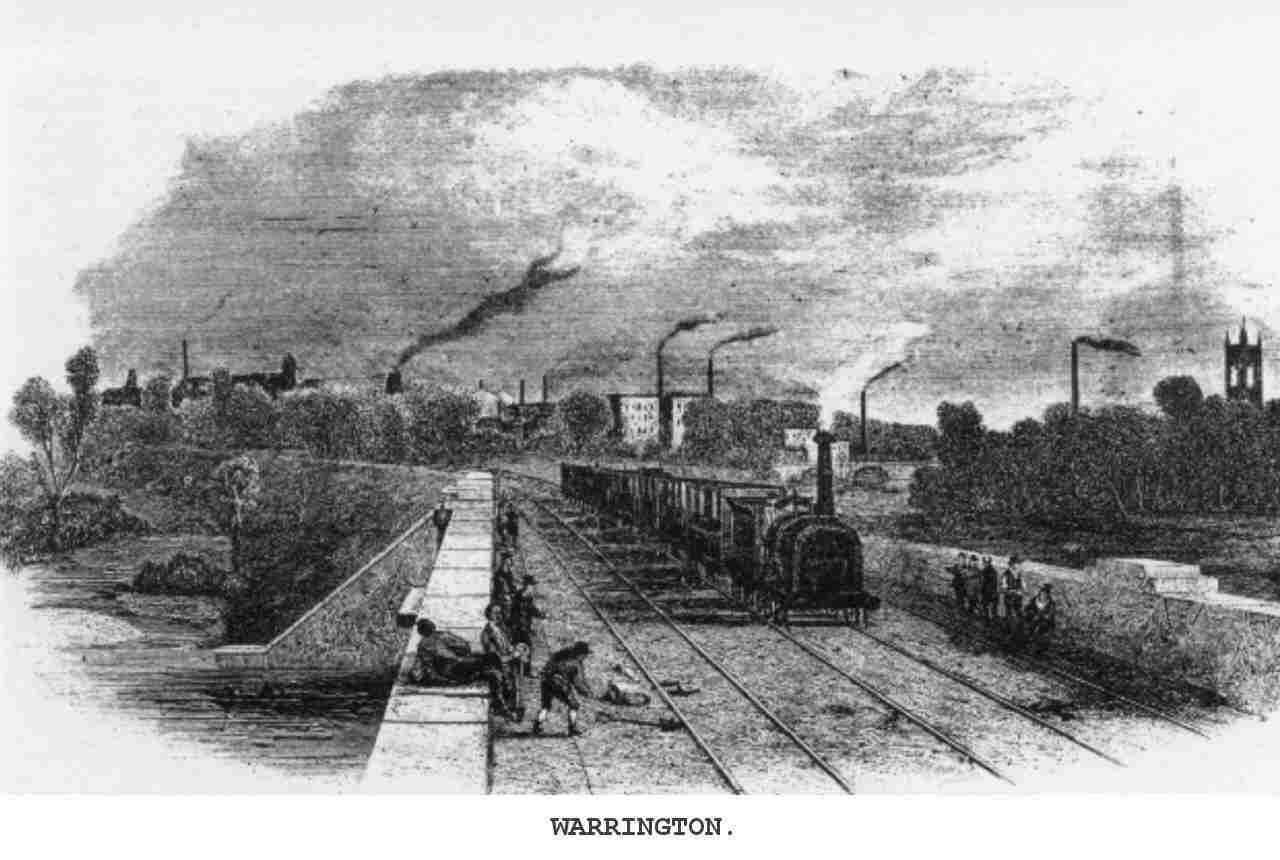
Warrington after the coming of the railway, 1851

The town has two main railway stations: Bank Quay is on the West Coast Main Line between London Euston and Glasgow Central and the Manchester Piccadilly to North Wales via Chester line, while Central is on the Liverpool to Manchester line (via Widnes and Warrington) with through services to Sheffield then to East Anglia or Cleethorpes. Bank Quay is much altered, but Central (built 1873) is of some architectural merit, featuring polychromatic brickwork. Both have undergone some refurbishment including new entrances. There are also railway stations in the suburbs at Padgate, Sankey, Glazebrook and Birchwood. A new railway station, Warrington West in Chapelford, near Great Sankey, opened in December 2019.

The town lies close to the M62, M6 and M56 motorways and midway between Liverpool and Manchester airports. It also has five primary A roads, the A49, A50, A56, A57 and A580 (East Lancashire Road), which forms part of the northern boundary of the borough.

Warrington's Own Buses, one of the few municipal bus companies to survive in public ownership, runs most bus services within the town. The Bee Network and Arriva North West provide bus links to surrounding destinations such as Manchester, the Trafford Centre, Liverpool, St Helens, Runcorn, Widnes and Chester. A real-time passenger information system is installed at some bus stops. A new bus station known as Warrington Interchange opened in 2006 at the Golden Square Shopping Centre.

The River Mersey runs through the heart of the town dividing it in two. There are only two main thoroughfares crossing the Mersey in Warrington: at Warrington Bridge at Bridge Foot and at the Kingsway Bridge. Before the M6 was built, these routes were very busy with through traffic.

The Manchester Ship Canal runs through the south of the town; three swing bridges and a high-level cantilever bridge provide crossing points. Although shipping movements on the ship canal are far less frequent than in years past, they can cause severe delay to local road traffic. The Bridgewater Canal runs through the borough from the village of Lymm to Walton Hall and Gardens, a local park/leisure area. The course of the Sankey Canal runs through the west of the town, although the only navigable section is at the lock to the River Mersey estuary at Fiddlers Ferry.

=== Warrington Bus Interchange ===
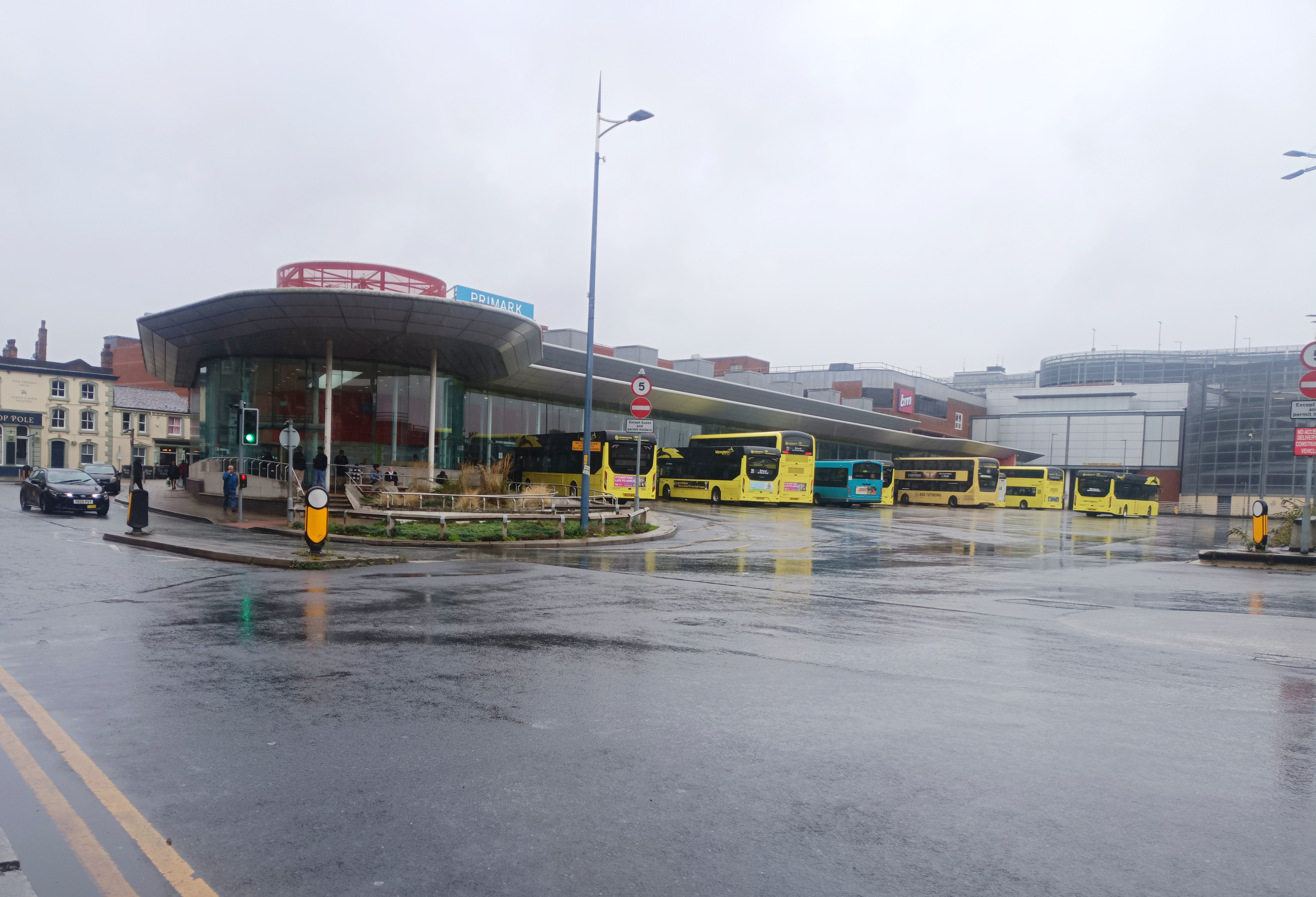
Warrington Bus Interchange in September 2026

The interchange consists of 19 departure stands, alphabeted from A to U (except I and O), all of which employ a drive-in reverse-out layout. Each stand has a computerised information screen which also ties into the real-time information system. All stands are served from the main concourse building, which contains toilets, a newsagent, cafe, and a combined travel and tourist information office. There is access to the Golden Square shopping centre via escalators and lifts. The exits on the eastern side of the building lead onto Winwick Street, on which can be found a taxi rank and Warrington Central railway station within around 100 metres.

The bus station is the terminus for all local bus services within Warrington. Regional services operate to neighbouring cities Liverpool, Manchester and Chester, as well as to Wigan, Leigh, the Trafford Centre, Altrincham, Northwich, Runcorn, Widnes and St Helens. The majority of bus services are operated by Warrington's Own Buses. Other services are provided by Arriva North West and Bee Network.

==== History ====
Warrington Bus Interchange (also known as Warrington Interchange) opened on 21 August 2006, next to the site of a temporary terminus that had been in use for the past thirteen months. The new interchange was built in conjunction with the extension and upgrade of the adjoining Golden Square shopping centre, and replaced the previous bus station which dated from 1979.

In 2021, a 3.5 m (11 ft) artwork was painted on glass at the bus station.

== Culture ==
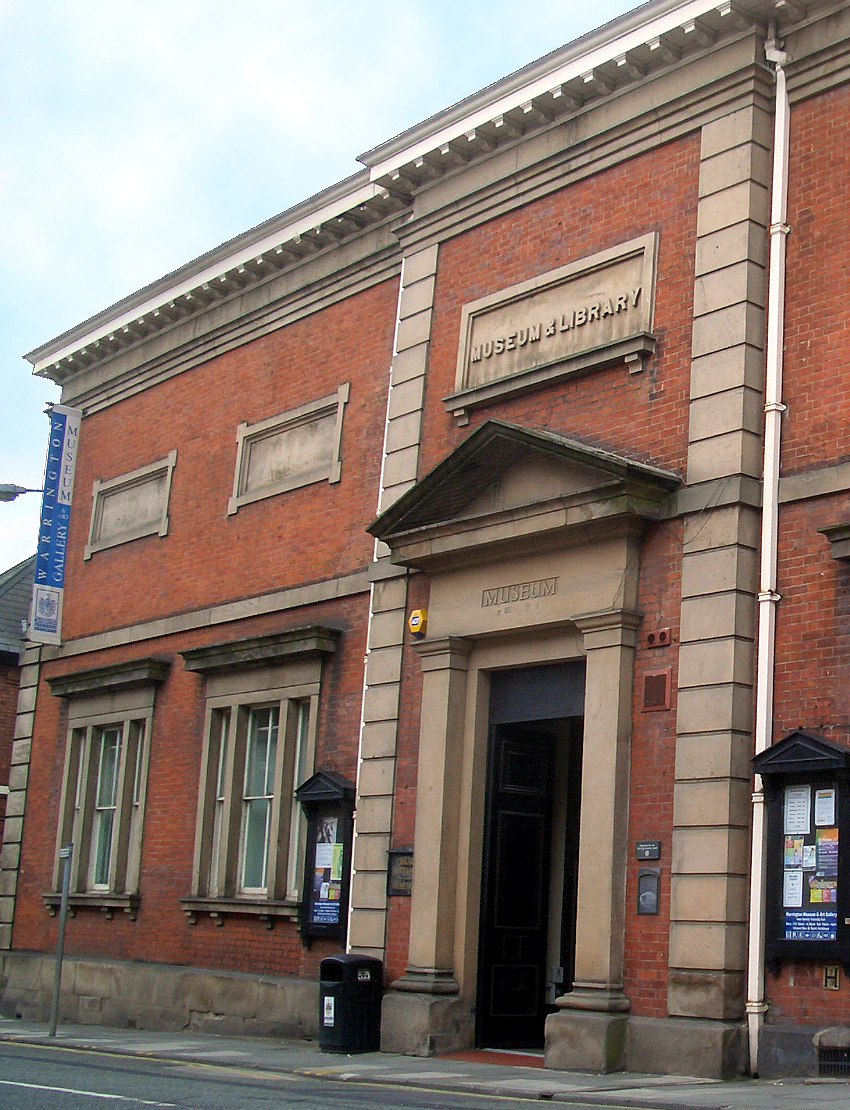
Warrington Museum & Art Gallery, opened 1858

In March 2017 Warrington Borough Council made an unsuccessful bid to become the UK City of Culture in 2021. However, various aspects of the town's cultural heritage gained prominence as a result of the bid such as the Grade II-listed Warrington Transporter Bridge, the last railway transporter bridge in the world, and the Warrington Academy which once earned the town the nickname of the Athens of the North.

Warrington has a concert hall (the Parr Hall), an arts centre (the Pyramid), three museums, and various public libraries throughout the borough. Warrington Central Library was the first rate-supported library in the UK.

There is a cinema at Westbrook, and another opened in 2019 as part of a town centre redevelopment. There are several parks in Warrington and designated nature reserves at Woolston Eyes, Risley Moss, Rixton Claypits and Paddington Meadows.

=== Museums ===
Warrington Museum & Art Gallery is situated in Warrington's Cultural Quarter on the first floor of a building it currently shares with Warrington Central Library. The town is also home to the Museum of Policing in Cheshire, located in part of the working police station, and the Warrington Museum of Freemasonry.

A heritage centre for the village of Lymm was given planning permission in February 2016.

=== Events ===
A number of festivals, carnivals and walking days are held annually in the Warrington area. Warrington Walking Day – originally a Sunday school festival – is held on the closest Friday to the last day of June, and the town centre is closed to traffic as churches walk together through the streets.

Other festivals, besides the many walking days, include:

- Appleton Thorn Bawming of the Thorn
- Birchwood Carnival and Safari Day
- Croft Carnival
- Culcheth Community Day
- Glazebury Gala
- Howley Carnival
- Lymm May Queen
- Lymm Dickensian Festival
- Lymm Rushbearing
- Penketh Carnival
- Stockton Heath Arts Festival
- Thelwall Rose Queen
- Warrington Music Festival
- Winwick Carnival
- Westy Carnival

=== Music ===
A regular series of free classical music concerts take place in Bold Street Methodist Church, organised by WACIDOM. This charity is also responsible for the biennial Warrington Competition for Young Musicians, held at Arley Hall. Regular classical recitals also take place at Walton Hall and St Wilfrid's Church, Grappenhall. Warrington also has many musical groups, including Warrington Male Voice Choir, Gemini Musical Theatre Company (formerly Warrington Light Opera), Warrington Youth Orchestra, North Cheshire Wind Orchestra, Centenary Theatre Company and ladies a cappella choir, the Cheshire Chord Company.

Warrington has a purpose-built concert hall, the Parr Hall, which houses a large and internationally famous concert pipe-organ made by the nineteenth-century French organ-builder Aristide Cavaillé-Coll.

A number of rock and pop musicians are associated with Warrington. Madchester pioneers The Stone Roses are closely associated with the town, particularly the native lead singer Ian Brown. Other artists include Spike Dawbarn from 1990s music act band 911, Kerry Katona of Atomic Kitten, Ben Byrne and James Stelfox from Starsailor and Tim Bowness of No-Man. The band Viola Beach (whose single "Swings & Waterslides" posthumously entered the UK Singles Chart at number 11) were formed in Warrington.

The Hit Man and Her TV show featuring producer Pete Waterman (of Stock Aitken Waterman) and Michaela Strachan debuted and regularly returned to the Mr Smiths nightclub in Warrington from the late 1980s to the early 1990s. The nightclub itself closed down in 2010.

Warrington is home to the two-day Neighbourhood Weekender music festival, which takes place in Victoria Park during the May bank holiday weekend. The event was first launched in 2018, and over 50,000 people attended the event over the two days. It has continued to take place annually with exceptions where it was not held in 2020 (due to the COVID-19 lockdown) and in 2024 (for unknown reasons).

=== Open spaces ===
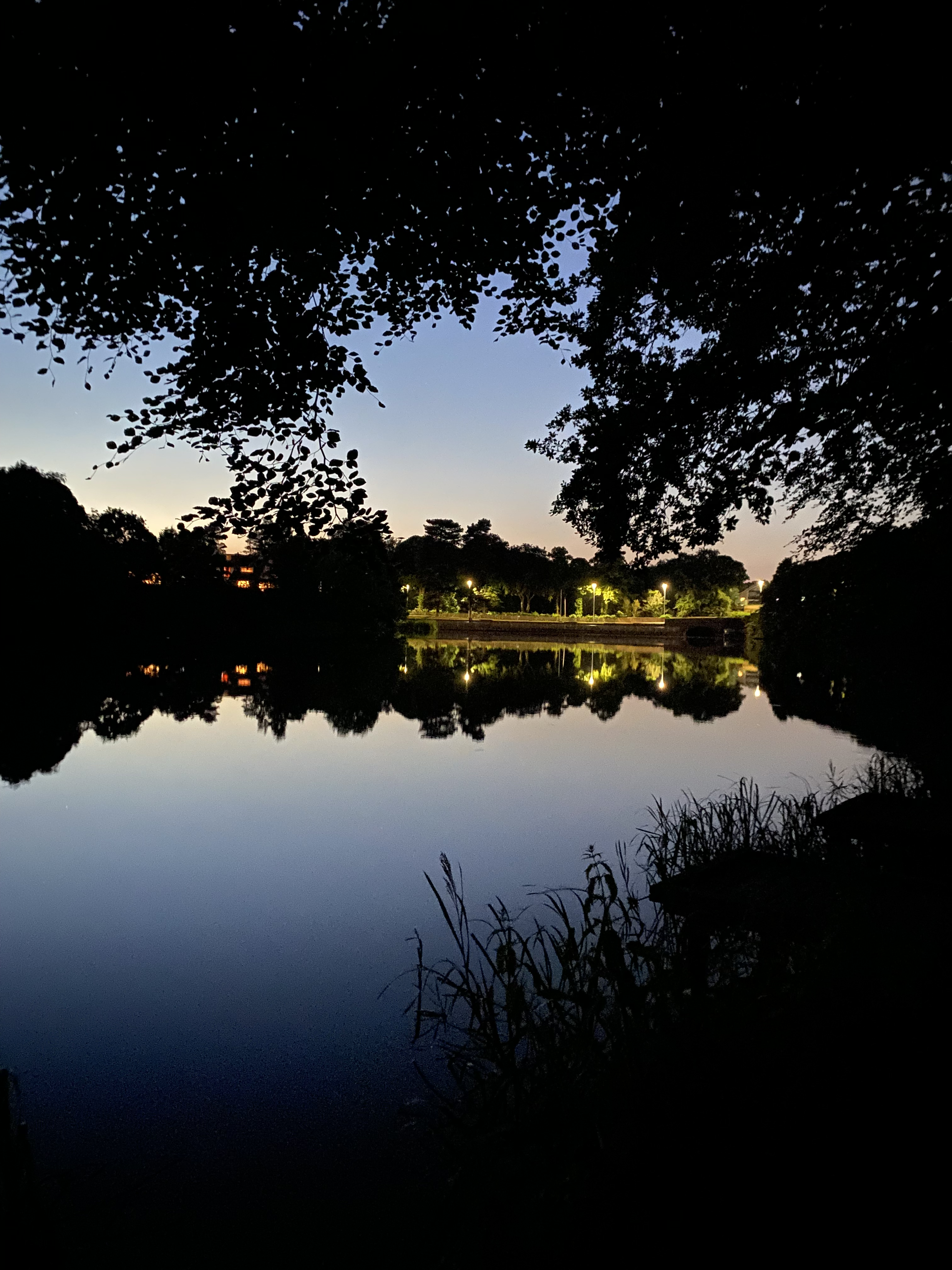
Lymm Dam pictured at sunset

Warrington has an array of open spaces, including parks, trails, nature reserves and gardens rich in history and visual beauty. Many of these attractions are dog friendly, and free of charge to enter, usually with man-made paths created to ensure safety. The attractions include:

- Culcheth Linear park- open 24hrs, with public toilets, parking, and staff based around the park
- Lymm dam - open 24hrs, water features, wildlife and woodland walks. Also has angling opportunities and links to the Trans Pennine trail.
- New Cut heritage and ecology trail- ongoing project including linear footpaths, Paddington meadows nature reserve, and links to several other parks in the area (listed below)
- Risley Moss local nature reserve - works with schools and partakes in regular subjects to help aid the life of local wildlife. Includes car parking and toilets
- Sankey valley Park - open 24hrs, includes picnic benches, car parking, angling opportunities and play areas.
- Trans Pennine Trail - open 24hrs, suitable for cycling, walking and running. Links to many other paths in the area.
- Victoria Park - includes sports facilities, changing facilities, training pitches, ASICS Stadium, play area and home to the annual Neighbourhood Weekender music festival
- Walton gardens - includes gardens, Walton hall, petting zoo, play areas, mini golf and footpaths accessible to all.

Warrington is also home to other small parks and open spaces such Woolston park, Birchwood forest park and Bank park. Most open areas are dog friendly and only require unfriendly dogs to be kept under proper control by owners.

=== Heritage ===
The historic core of Warrington contains many significant listed buildings, including Warrington Town Hall, St Elphin's Church and Warrington Museum, situated within Conservation Areas.

== Education ==
=== Higher education ===
The University of Chester has a campus at Padgate that was formerly part of Warrington Collegiate.

=== Colleges ===
Warrington is home to three colleges: Priestley Sixth Form and Community College, Warrington and Vale Royal College and University Technical College Warrington. Most of the high schools have their own post-16 provision (sixth-form).

=== Schools ===
There are 14 high schools throughout the borough:

Region	School name	Type of school	Pupils
Birchwood	Birchwood Community High School	Academy Converter	1,124
Culcheth	Culcheth High School	Community	1,132
Appleton	Bridgewater High School	Academy Converter	1,650
Latchford	Sir Thomas Boteler Church of England High School	Church of England (Aided)	752
Latchford	Cardinal Newman Catholic High School (Warrington)	Roman Catholic (Aided)	780
Great Sankey	Great Sankey High School	Academy Converter	2,000
Lymm	Lymm High School	Academy Converter	1,877
Padgate	Padgate Academy	Academy Converter	455
Penketh	Penketh High School	Academy Converter	1,137
Westbrook	St Gregory's Catholic High School	Roman Catholic (Aided)	1012
Orford	Beamont Collegiate Academy	Academy Converter	750
Padgate	King's Leadership Academy Warrington	Free School	320
Lymm	Bright Futures School	Private	30
Thelwall	Chaigeley School	Private	35

Woolston High School closed in 2012.

There are also 69 primary schools in the borough.

The Manchester Japanese School (マンチェスター日本人補習授業校 Manchesutā Nihonjin Hoshū Jugyō Kō), a weekend Japanese educational programme, is held at the Language Centre at Lymm High School.

== Sport ==
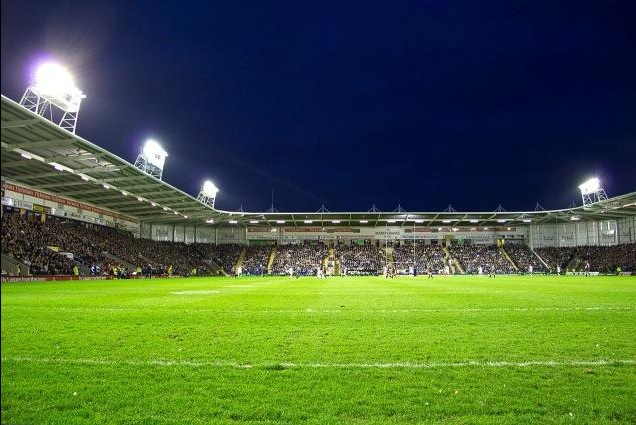
Halliwell Jones Stadium, home to Warrington Wolves

Rugby league is the town's premier sport in the form of Warrington Wolves, who were historically nicknamed "The Wire" because of Warrington's history of wire making. In 2003 the club left Wilderspool Stadium, its home for over a century, and moved to the Halliwell Jones Stadium. Warrington RLFC are the only team to have played every season in the top flight of rugby league. They established themselves as one of the leading rugby clubs in the country by taking home the Challenge Cup for two years running in 2009 and 2010 and a further win in 2012. This was won by them for the first time since 1974.

The club also reached the cup finals in 2016 and 2018, where they lost to Hull FC & Catalans Dragons respectively. In 2019, Warrington triumphed over St Helens in the Challenge Cup Final, 18-4, to lift the trophy for the 7th time. In 2011 the Wolves gained the Super League Leaders Shield for the first time (winning again in 2016), and in 2012 they appeared in the Super League Grand Final for the first time versus Leeds Rhinos with the chance to become only the third team to win the Challenge Cup/Grand Final double – however, they lost. They also reached the Grand Final again in 2013, 2016 and 2018, losing to Wigan Warriors on all occasions, Warrington's last domestic title came in 1955, when they beat Oldham at Manchester City's Maine Road. Warrington teams play in the British Amateur Rugby League Association leagues.

Football is represented by Warrington Town at Cantilever Park, next to the Manchester Ship Canal. The club has several nicknames including Town, Yellows and The Wire. Warrington Town are currently in National League North following promotion in 2023. Warrington's biggest success was in the 2014 FA Cup where they reached the first round proper for the first time, whilst in the eighth tier. Warrington drew Exeter City of the fourth tier, who were at the time of the game 100 places above the Yellows. The match was shown live on BBC One and sold out Cantilever Park. Warrington famously won the game 1–0, but lost to 5th-tier Gateshead in the second round. The town also has another non-league team, Rylands F.C. who currently play in the Northern Premier League Premier Division.

Rowing in Warrington may well have been taking place for nearly 200 years. It is known that Warrington Regatta is well over 150 years old, often attracting large crowds on the riverbank. The modern Warrington rowing club started in the mid-1980s and is based near Kingsway Bridge. Warrington is home to both recreational and competitive rowers.

Warrington Athletic Club is based at Victoria Park, where a new eight-lane synthetic track was built in 1998, after the original track was destroyed in a fire the previous year.

Speedway racing, formerly known as dirt track racing, was staged in Warrington in its pioneering era between 1928 and 1930. The track entered a team in the 1929 English Dirt Track League and the 1930 Northern League. Efforts to revive the venue in 1947 failed to materialise.

Warrington Wolves Basketball team was set up in 2009 and competes in the English Basketball League Division Four.

Warrington has four predominant rugby union teams: Warrington RUFC, Lymm RFC, Gentlemen of Moore RUFC and Eagle RUFC, who are based at Thornton Road.

== Media ==
Warrington receives its television signals from the Winter Hill TV transmitter.

Local radio stations are BBC Radio Manchester, BBC Radio Merseyside, Heart North West, Capital North West & Wales and Independent Local Radio station Greatest Hits Radio Liverpool & The North West (formerly Wire FM), formerly based in Orrell, also serves the Warrington area. Community radio station Radio Warrington broadcasts from a studio in Warrington Retail Market. They hold an AM licence and have received planning permission for a transmitter, though their broadcasts are currently only available online.

Warrington's longest established newspaper is the Warrington Guardian. Published weekly and costing £1, it is currently owned by Newsquest and has sales of just over 17,000. Bridge Foot based Orbit News Ltd produce a monthly free news magazine, Warrington Worldwide, as well as three community magazines, Warrington Worldwide, Lymm Life (first published April 1999) and Culcheth Life (First published April 2003) and the daily news website. The free monthly newspaper Cheshire Times is also distributed in the southern half of the borough.

== Landmarks ==
See also Listed buildings in Warrington

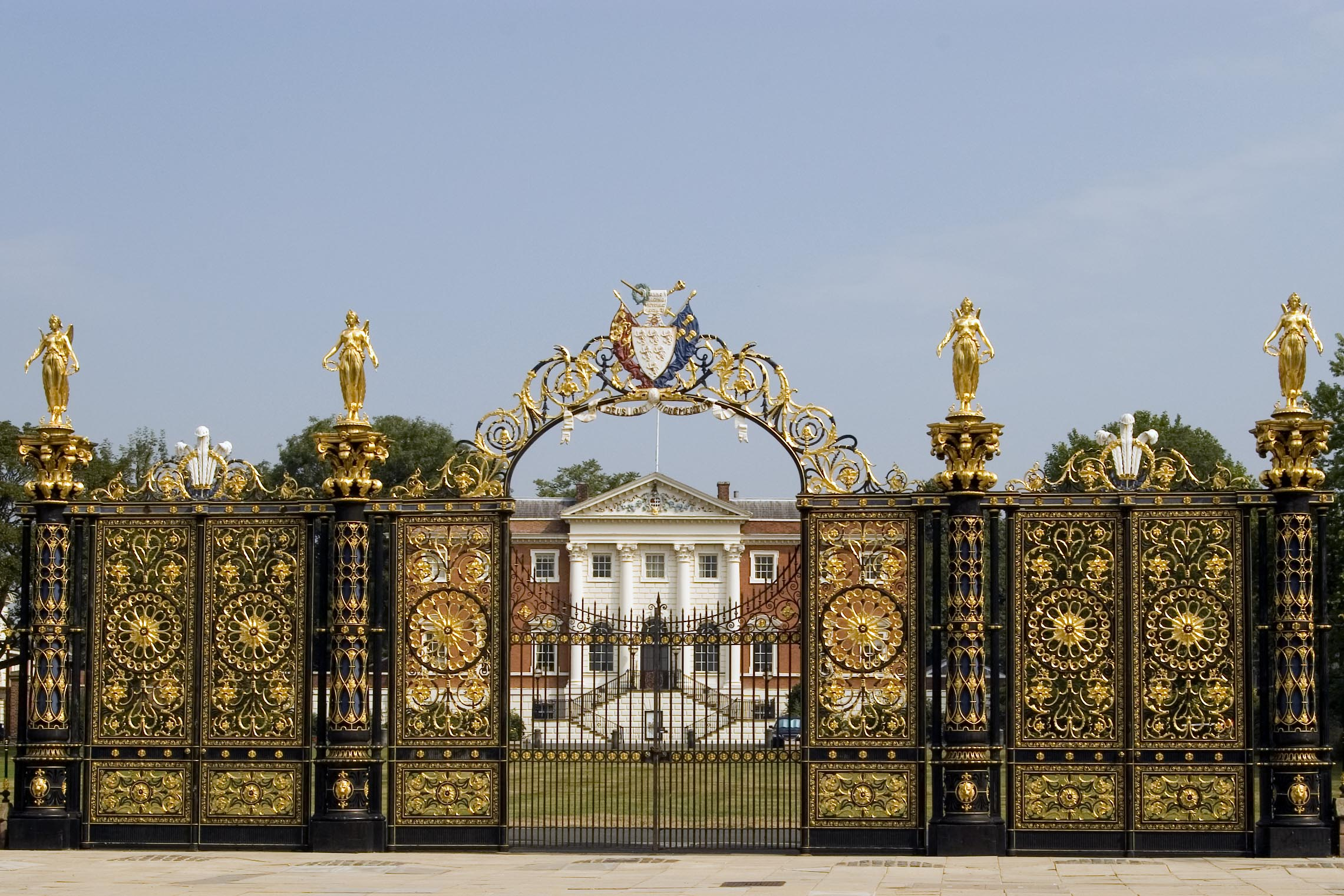
The park gates at Warrington Town Hall

=== Churches and other religious buildings ===
- St Wilfrid's Church, Grappenhall, Grade I listed medieval church
- St Oswald's Church, Winwick, Grade I listed medieval church
- The 14th-century Parish Church of St Elphin, largely a Victorian rebuild with a 281-foot (86 m) spire, the sixth tallest in the UK
- Holy Trinity Church, 1758, Grade II* listed Georgian church at Market Gate
- St Mary's Church, Grade II church designed by E.W. Pugin and Peter Paul Pugin in Buttermarket Street

=== Civic amenities ===
- Warrington Museum & Art Gallery, Grade II listed building and one of the oldest municipal museums in the UK
- Warrington Town Hall (and its golden gates), formerly Bank Hall (built 1750), the home of the Philips family and their scion the artist Nathaniel George Philips
- Halliwell Jones Stadium, home of Warrington Wolves
- Parr Hall Concert Hall, home to a rare concert pipe-organ made by the great French organ-builder Aristide Cavaillé-Coll
- Pyramid Arts Centre on Palmyra Square

=== Industrial and commercial structures ===
- Warrington Transporter Bridge, a Grade II* listed building and a Scheduled Ancient Monument
- The Barley Mow, established in 1561, the oldest pub in Warrington
- The Cheshire Lines railway warehouse, now redeveloped as apartments
- The row of late Victorian terracotta-clad shops on Bridge Street
- Fiddlers Ferry Power Station, decommissioned
- The industrial modernist Unilever Soapworks, now being redeveloped as a data centre
- IKEA store, near the Gemini retail park, the first of the IKEA chain to be built in the UK
- The former Woolworth's Building in Sankey Street (originally Garnett's furniture showroom and currently Poundland)
- Musical instrument retailer Dawsons Music has been based on Sankey Street since 1898, where its headquarters remain to this day.

=== Other ===
- Grappenhall Heys Walled Garden
- The Warrington Academy, a dissenters' institute where Joseph Priestley once taught. After the academy moved, the building housed the offices of the local newspaper the Warrington Guardian until June 2016. A Grade II listed statue of Oliver Cromwell stands in front of the academy.
- "Cromwell's Cottage" (17th century), which Oliver Cromwell is said to have visited

== Notable people ==
=== Public service ===
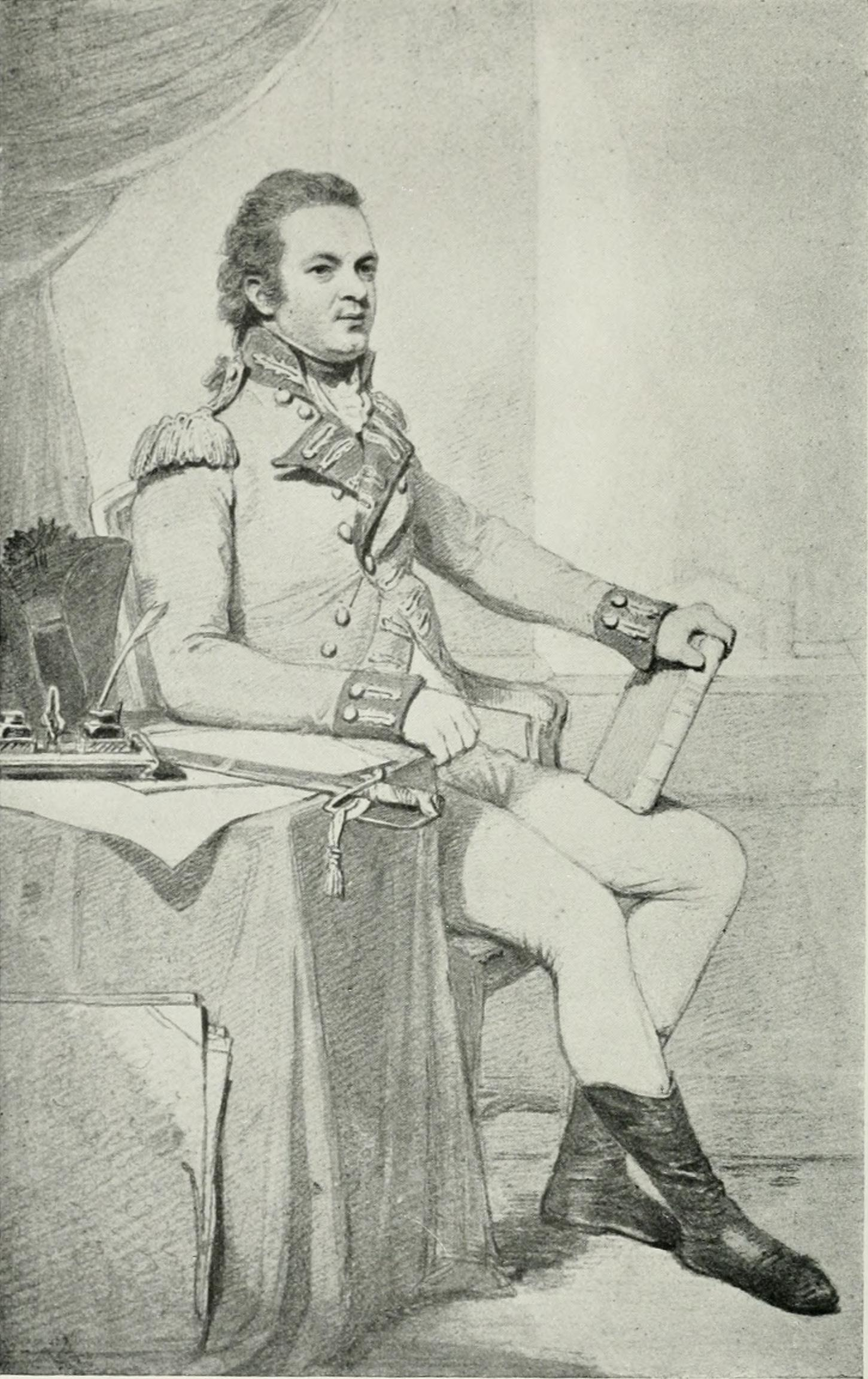
Captain John Drinkwater Bethune

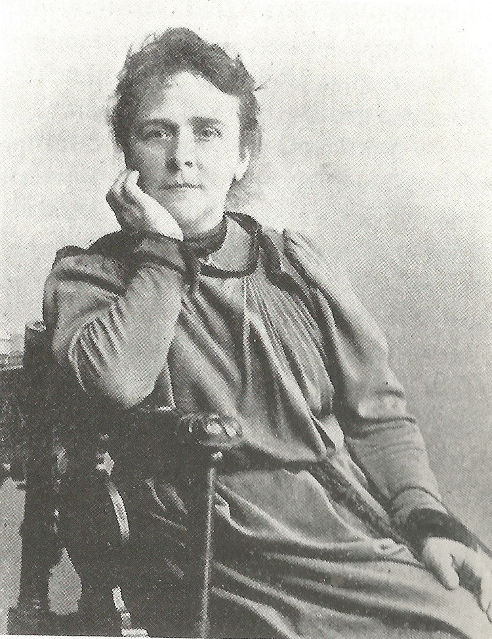
Jeannie Mole, 1880

- James Bell (1524–1584), Catholic priest and martyr, born in Warrington
- Edward Barlow (1639 in Warrington – 1719), priest and mechanician
- John Seddon (1725–1770) English Dissenter and rector of Warrington Academy.
- John Macgowan (1726–1780), non-conformist preacher satirist and author; resident of Warrington
- Edward Evanson (1731 in Warrington – 1805), controversial clergyman
- Thomas Barnes (1747–1810) a Unitarian minister and educational reformer.
- John Drinkwater Bethune (1762 in Latchford – 1844), army Colonel, documented the Great Siege of Gibraltar
- Maria Hill (1791 in Winwick–1881), Canadian heroine of the US/UK War of 1812
- Philip Pearsall Carpenter (1819–1877), Presbyterian minister between 1846 and 1862
- William Norman (1832–1896), local war hero, born in Warrington, awarded the Victoria Cross
- Jeannie Mole (1841 in Warrington – 1912), socialist, feminist, and trade union organiser
- John Webster (1845 in Warrington – 1914), civil engineer who specialised in designing bridges
- B. H. Roberts (1857 in Warrington – 1933), Mormon leader, historian, politician and polygamist
- Captain Guy Wareing (1899 in Latchford – 1918) World War I flying ace
- George Cardell Briggs (1910 in Warrington–2004), the first Bishop of The Seychelles
- Alfred Edward Sephton (1911 in Warrington – 1941), Royal Navy Petty Officer, recipient of the Victoria Cross
- Helen Newlove, Baroness Newlove (born 1961), local community reform campaigner, appointed Victims' Commissioner in 2012

=== Politics ===
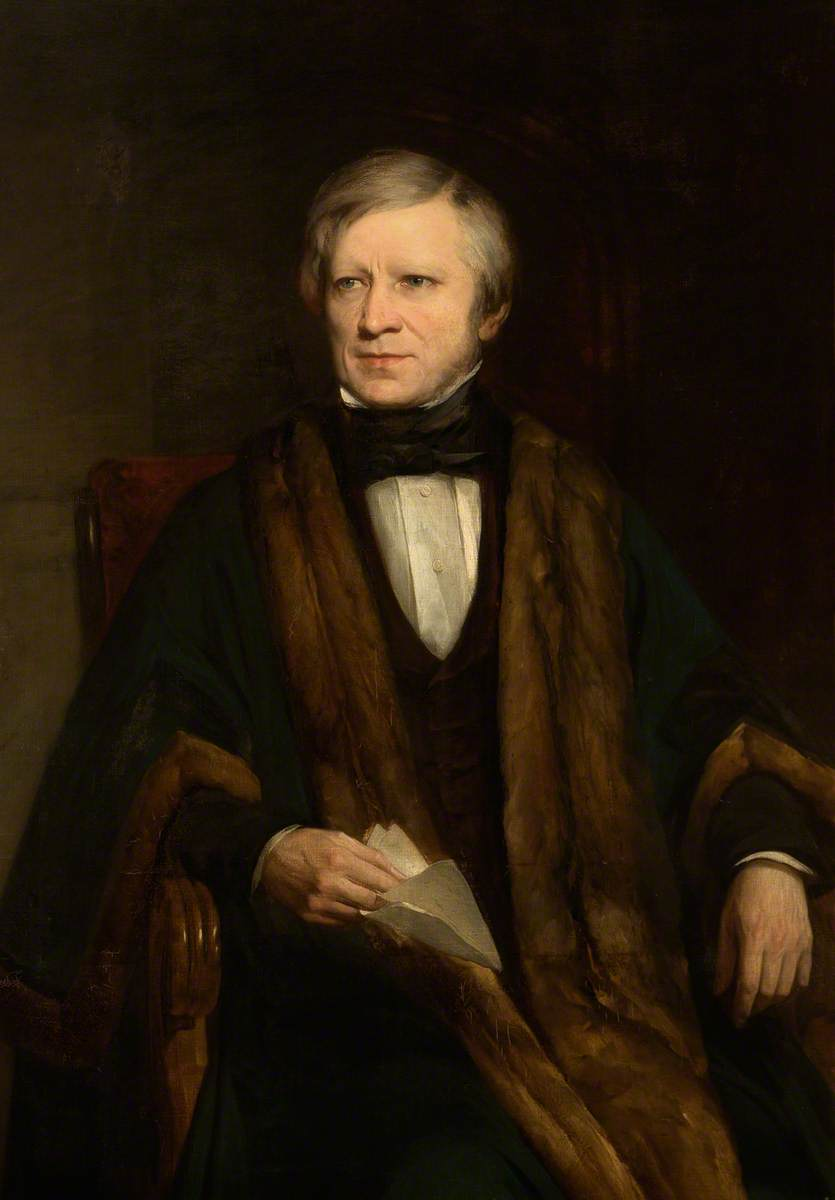
William Beamont, 1849

- William Beamont (1797–1889), lawyer, philanthropist, first Mayor of Warrington, founded the municipal library
- Sir Gilbert Greenall, 1st Baronet (1806–1894), businessman and Conservative MP for Warrington 1847–1868, 1874–1880 & 1885–1892
- Peter Rylands (1820 in Warrington – 1887), wire manufacturer and Liberal politician, MP in two periods between 1868 and 1887
- Joseph Leicester (1825 in Warrington – 1903), glass blower and Liberal politician, MP for West Ham South from 1885 to 1886
- Edward Owen Greening (1836 – 1923) a British co-operative and radical activist.
- Reginald Essenhigh (1890 in Warrington–1955), MP for Newton from 1931 to 1935 and then a judge
- Dave Cook (1941 in Warrington–1993), British communist activist, also known as a rock climber
- Joan Ryan (born 1955 in Warrington), politician, MP for Enfield North 1997–2010 and 2015–2019
- Antony Green (born 1960 in Warrington), Australian psephologist and commentator
- Chris Matheson (born 1968 in Warrington), Labour Party politician, MP for the City of Chester 2015–2022
- Liam Byrne (born 1970 in Warrington), Labour Party politician, MP for Birmingham Hodge Hill and Solihull North since 2004

=== Science and business ===
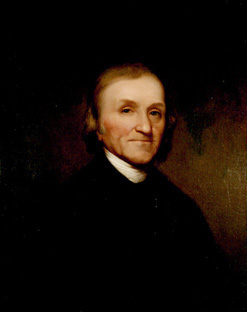
Joseph Priestley, 1801

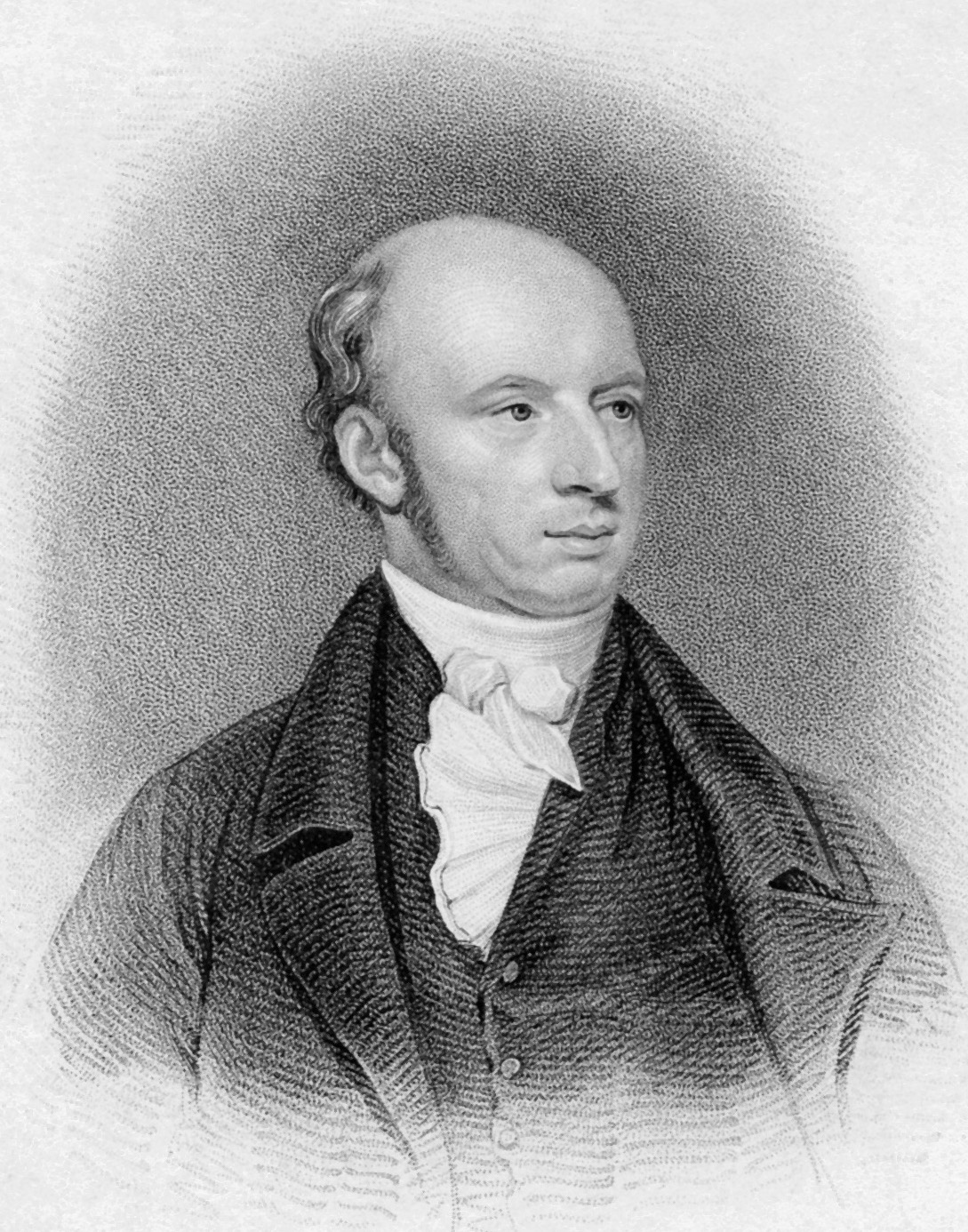
Arthur Aikin, 1824

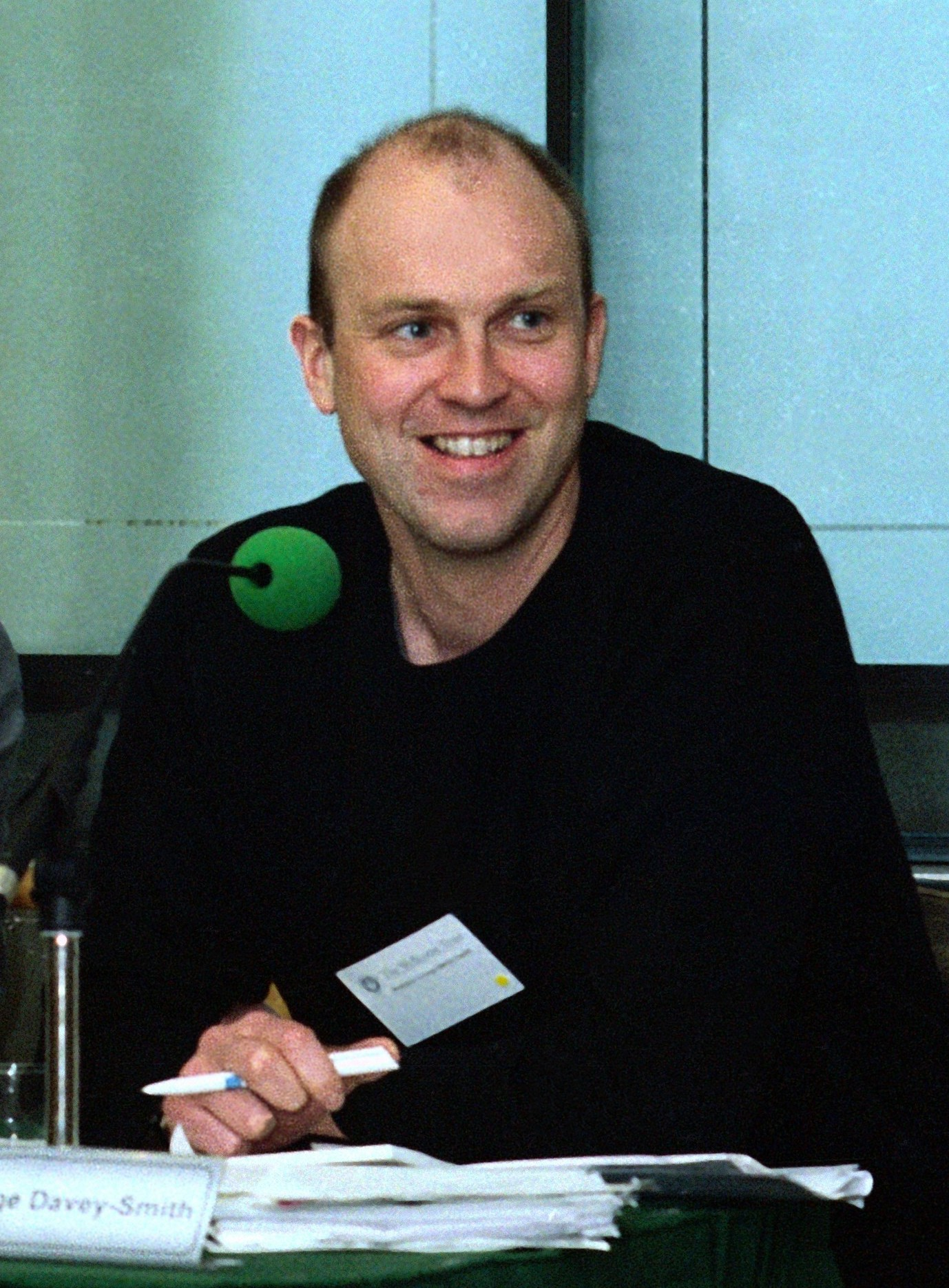
George Davey Smith, 1999

- John Harrison (1693–1776), inventor of the marine chronometer which established longitude; long-time inhabitant of Warrington
- Anna Blackburne (1726–1793), botanist, naturalist correspondent of Carl Linnaeus; lived and died locally
- Joseph Priestley (1733–1804), non-conformist clergyman, philosopher and scientist, discoverer of oxygen; lived in Warrington and taught at the Warrington Academy between 1761 and 1767
- Thomas Percival (1740 in Warrington − 1804), physician, ethicist, author; he wrote a code of medical ethics.
- Peter Litherland (1756–1805), watchmaker and inventor of the lever watch; born in Warrington
- John Cragg (1767 in Warrington–1854), English ironmaster who ran a foundry in Liverpool
- Arthur Aikin (1773 in Warrington – 1854), chemist, mineralogist and scientific writer, and was a founding member of the Chemical Society
- Charles Rochemont Aikin (1775 in Warrington – 1847), doctor and chemist
- Joseph Crosfield (1792–1844), businessman, established a soap and chemical manufacturing business in Warrington called Joseph Crosfield and Sons
- William Wilson (1799 in Warrington–1871), botanist, studied bryology (the study of moss & liverwort)
- James Kendrick (1809-1882) physician and antiquary; looked after the antiquities in the Warrington Museum.
- William Kirtley (1840 in Warrington – 1919), London Chatham and Dover Railway Locomotive Superintendent
- William Owen (1846 in Latchford – 1910), local architect, worked with William Lever to create Port Sunlight
- Geoffrey Hewitt (1934–2019) British chemical engineer notable for contributions to heat transfer and multiphase flow, in 2007 recipient of Global Energy Prize
- Philippa Perry (born 1957 in Warrington), psychotherapist, supporter of the Women's Equality Party and married to artist and cross-dresser Grayson Perry
- George Davey Smith (born 1959 in Warrington), epidemiologist
- Ian Crawford (born 1961), professor of planetary science and astrobiology
- Andy Bird (born 1964 in Warrington), film producer and executive, chairman of Walt Disney International
- Gavin Patterson (born 1967), brought up in Warrington, chief executive of BT Group plc, 2013-2019
- Helen Wilson (born 1973 in Warrington), mathematician focuses on theoretical and numerical modelling

=== Writers ===
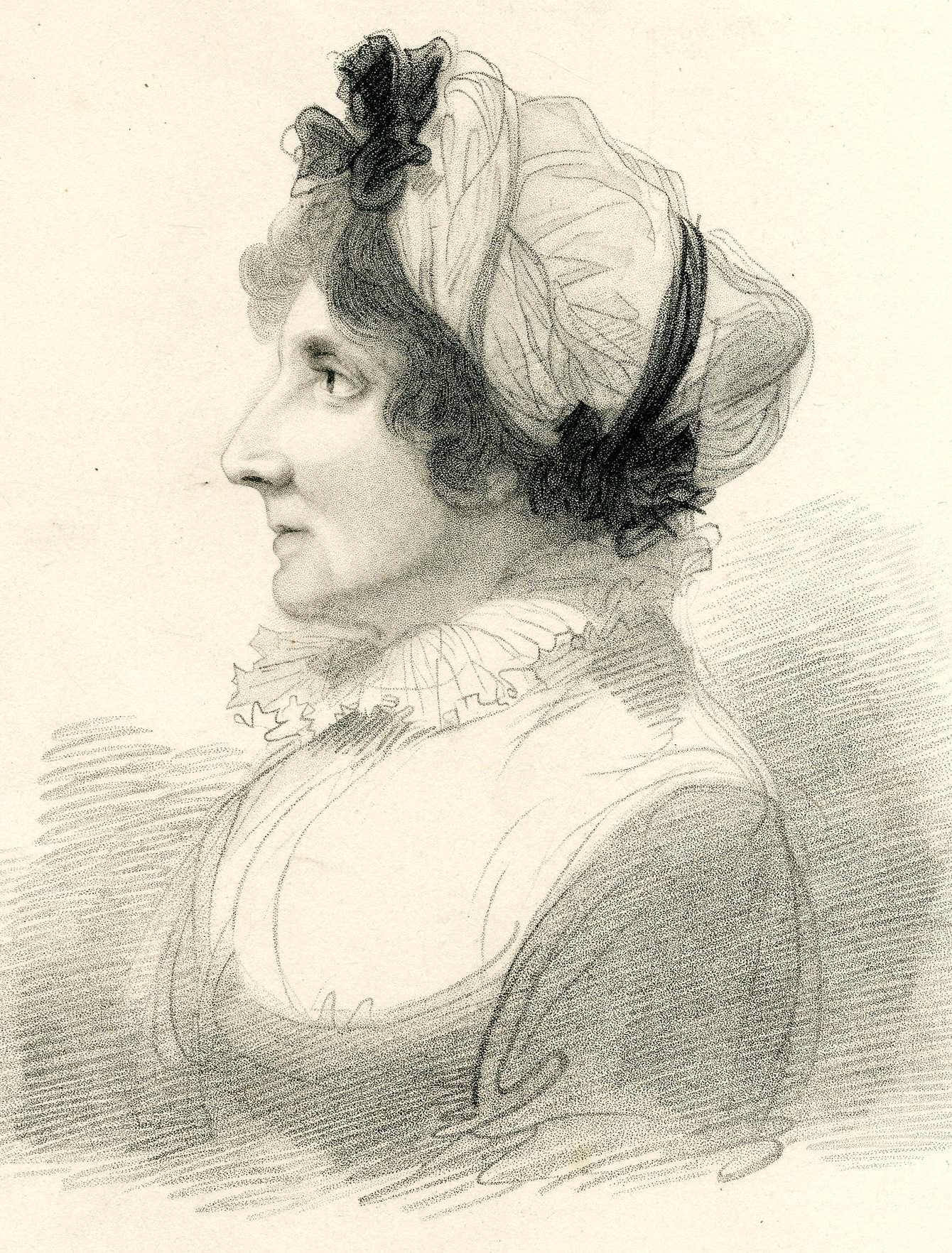
Engraving of Anna Laetitia Barbauld, 1822

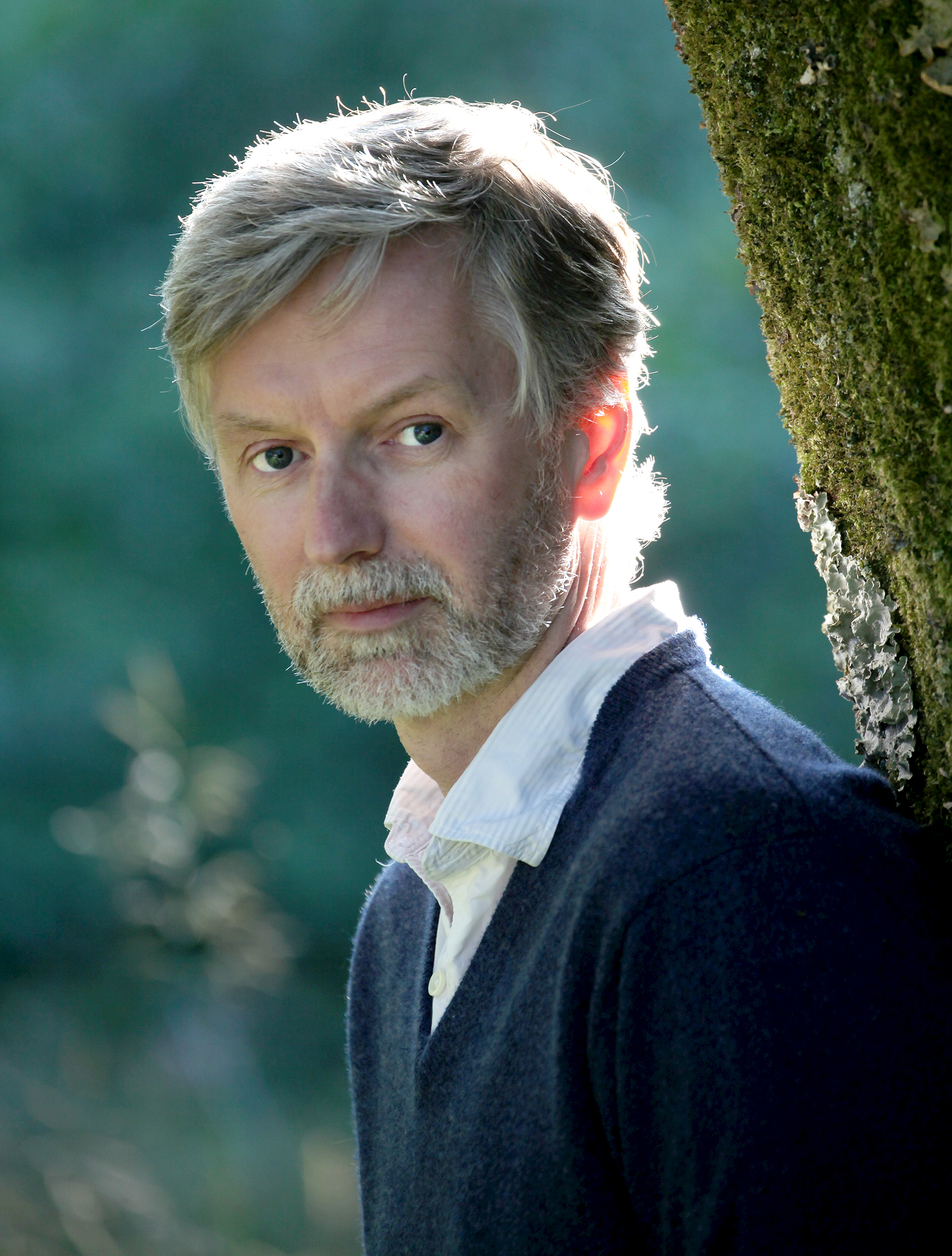
Christopher Potter, 2012

- Susanna Wright (1697 in Warrington–1784), American poet botanist, business owner and legal scholar
- Anna Laetitia Barbauld (1743–1825), poet and literary critic; lived in Warrington 1758–1774.
- Edmund Aikin (1780 in Warrington – 1820), architect and writer on architecture
- Lucy Aikin (1781 in Warrington – 1864), historical writer, also used the pseudonym Mary Godolphin.
- William John Beamont (1828 in Warrington – 1868), clergyman and author, founded the Cambridge School of Art
- Ann Pilling (born 1944 in Warrington), author and poet best known for young adult fiction
- Peter Brimelow (born 1947 in Warrington), American writer, paleoconservative
- Paul Lewis (born 1948 in Warrington), freelance financial journalist, presenter of Money Box on BBC Radio 4
- David Banks (born 1948 in Warrington), former British newspaper editor
- Ian Inkster (1949 in Warrington – 2023) a global historian, author and columnist.
- Steve Parker (born 1952 in Warrington), writer of children's and adult's science books
- Alan Gibbons (born 1953) writer of children's books and campaigner and advocate for libraries.
- Martin Sixsmith (born 1954 in Warrington), author and radio/television presenter, primarily working for the BBC. His book Philomena was made into the film starring Judi Dench and Steve Coogan, who played Sixsmith
- Philippa, Lady Perry (born 1957), integrative psychotherapist and author.
- Christopher Potter (born 1959 in Warrington), author and editor.
- Gary Slater (born 1961 in Warrington), sports journalist, currently working for the Daily Telegraph
- Robin Jarvis (born 1963), brought up in Warrington, writes young adult fiction, children's novels and dark fantasy
- Tim Firth (born 1964 in Warrington), dramatist, screenwriter and songwriter
- Michelle Olley (born 1966) writer, journalist and magazine and book editor.
- Rebekah Brooks (born 1968), journalist, newspaper editor and former chief executive of News International, attended Appleton Hall County Grammar School in Warrington
- Curtis Jobling (born 1972), author, illustrator and production designer of Bob the Builder, lives in Warrington
- Helen Walsh (born 1977), writer and film director
- Seán Hewitt (born 1990) a poet, lecturer and literary critic; Fellow of the Royal Society of Literature

=== Artists ===
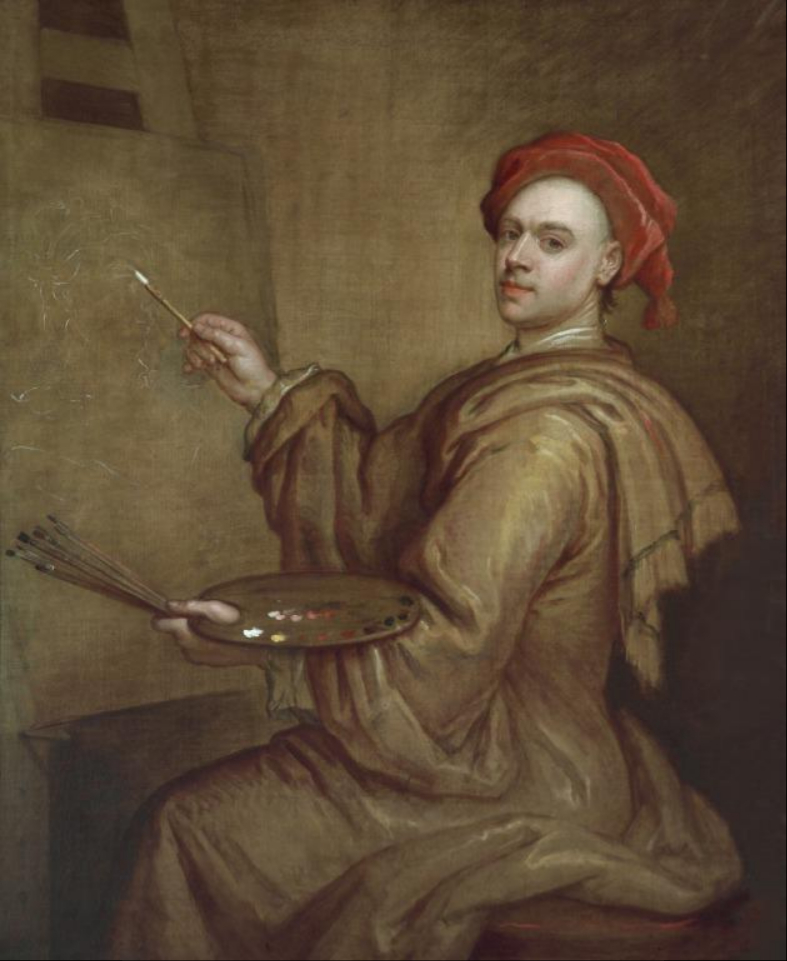
Hamlet Winstanley, 1730, Self-Portrait

- Hamlet Winstanley (1698–1756), painter and engraver; designed Stanley Street; born and died locally
- John Warrington Wood (1839–1886), sculptor of mythological subjects and portrait busts; born and died locally
- Sir Luke Fildes (1843–1927), artist, studied at Warrington School of Art
- Henry Woods (1846 in Warrington – 1921), painter and illustrator, an artist of the Neo-Venetian school
- James Charles (1851 in Warrington – 1906), impressionist artist
- Gordon Ellis (1920–1978), painter, specialised in maritime painting; born in Warrington
- Eric Tucker (1932–2018), artist
- John Geering (1941 – 1999 in Warrington), cartoonist
- Ossie Clark (1942–1996), fashion designer, raised and went to school in Warrington
- Tom Lomax (born 1945 in Warrington), painter and sculptor

=== Actors ===
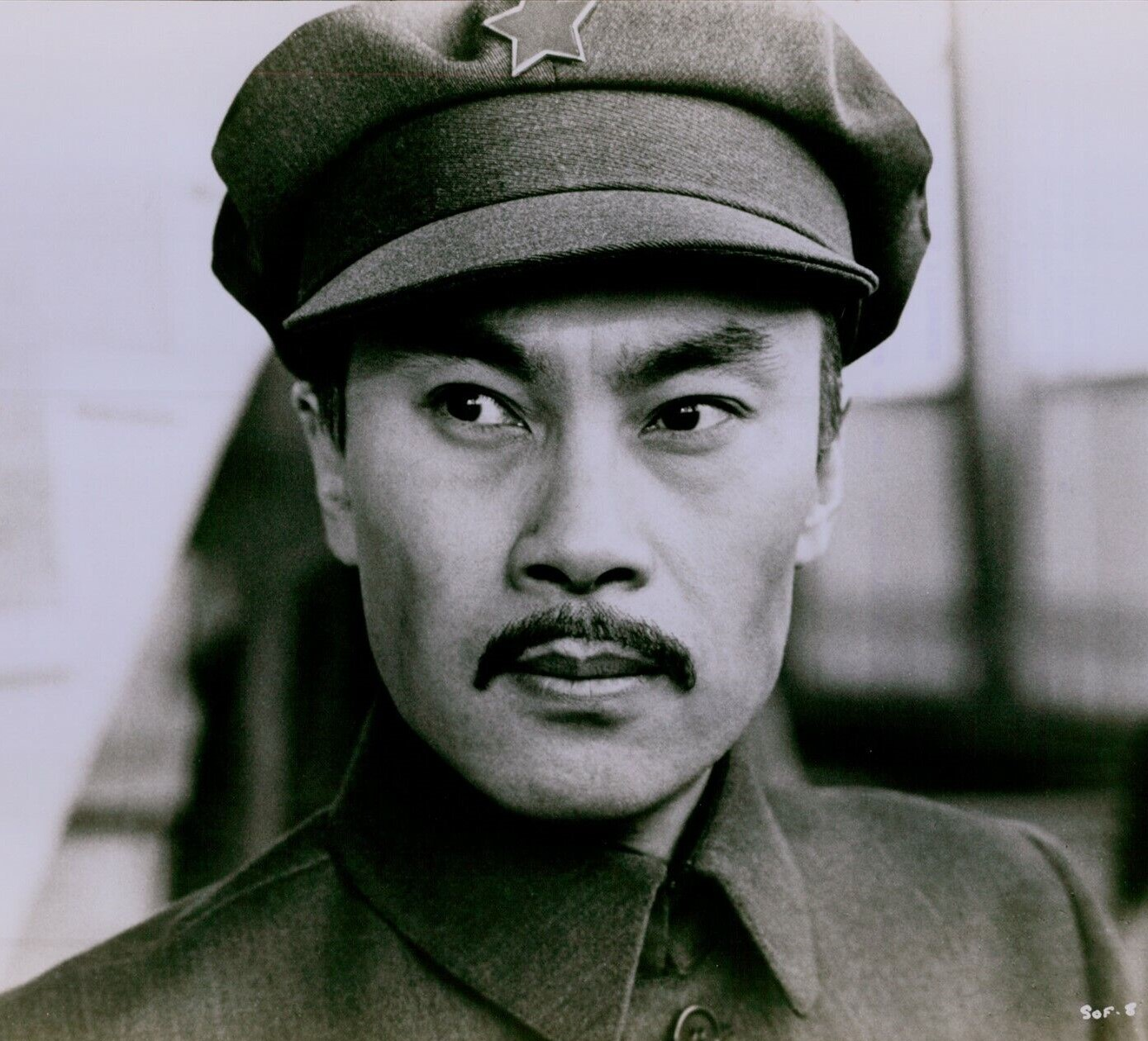
Burt Kwouk, 1968

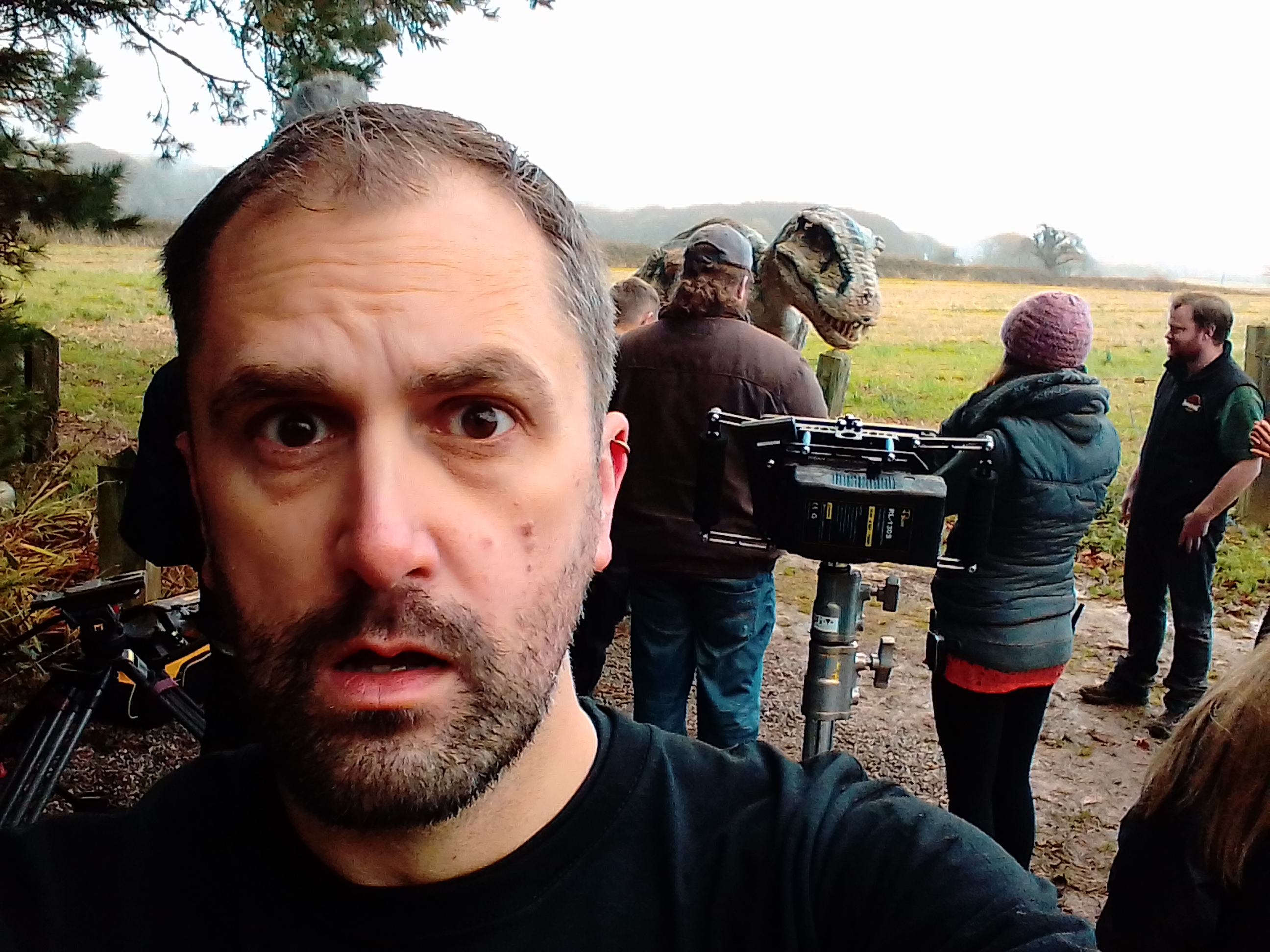
Nathan Head, 2017

- Elizabeth Whitlock (1761 in Warrington – 1836), actress, a member of the Kemble family of actors.
- Burt Kwouk (1930–2016), actor, The Pink Panther films, born in Warrington
- Sue Johnston (born 1943), actress, Brookside and The Royle Family
- Pete Postlethwaite (1946–2011), actor, a studio in the Pyramid Arts Centre has been named after him
- Pete McCarthy (1951–2004), actor, born in Warrington, a plaque on the wall of the Pyramid Arts Centre
- Martin Roberts (born 1963), presenter of BBC 1's Homes Under the Hammer
- Polly Walker (born 1966 in Warrington), actress, HBO's Rome and Netflix's Bridgerton
- Steven Arnold (born 1974), actor, known for his role as Ashley Peacock in Coronation Street, born in Warrington
- Warren Brown (born 1978), regular BBC actor, born and lives in Warrington
- Darren Jeffries (born 1982), actor, went to school locally, best known for his role as OB in Hollyoaks
- Natasha Hodgson (born 1986 in Croft), actress, singer, writer, & co-artistic director
- George Sampson (born 1993), dancer and winner of Britain's Got Talent in 2008
- Owen Cooper (born 2009), actor known for his performance in Netflix's miniseries Adolescence

=== Music ===
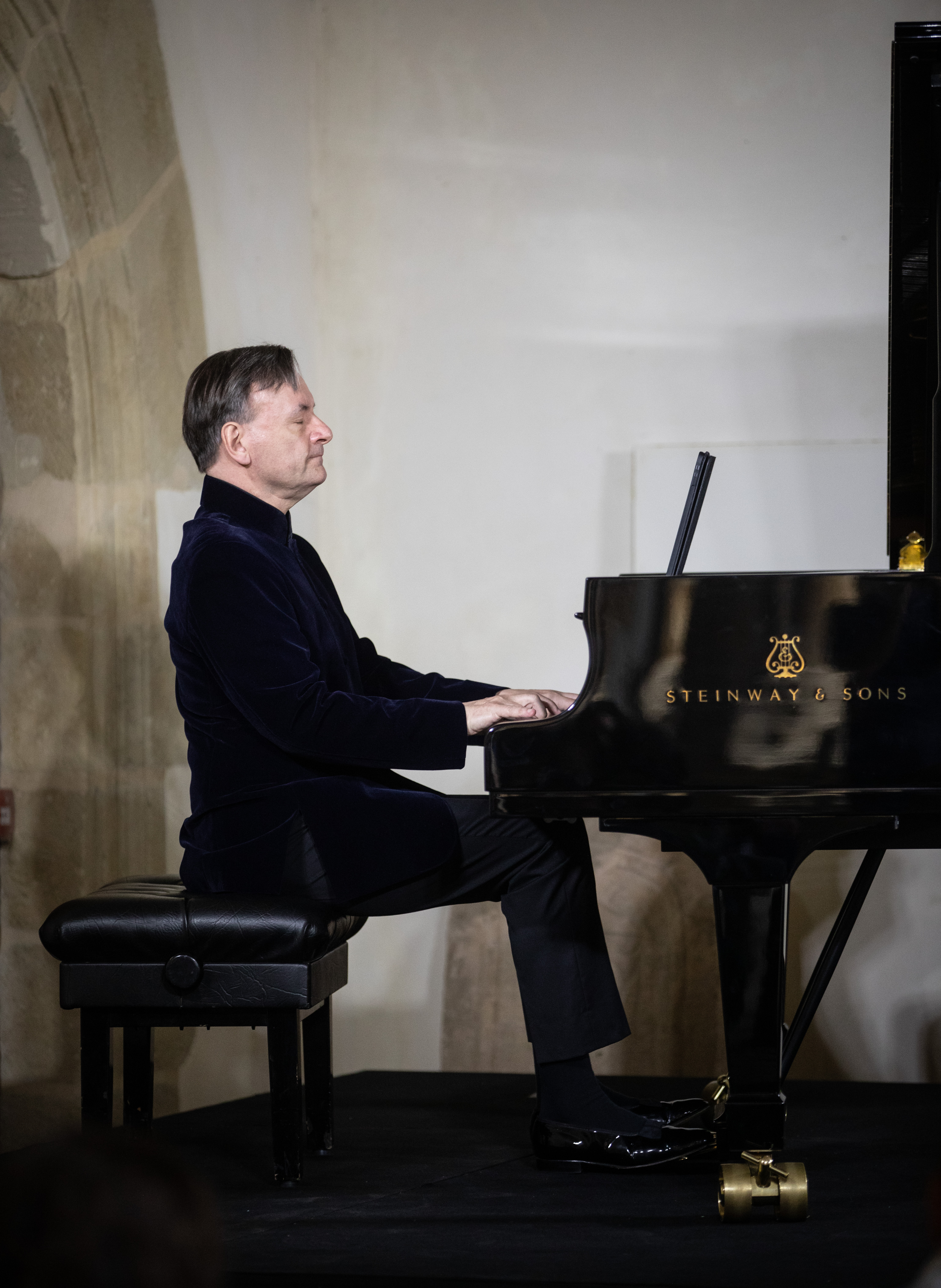
Stephen Hough, 2021

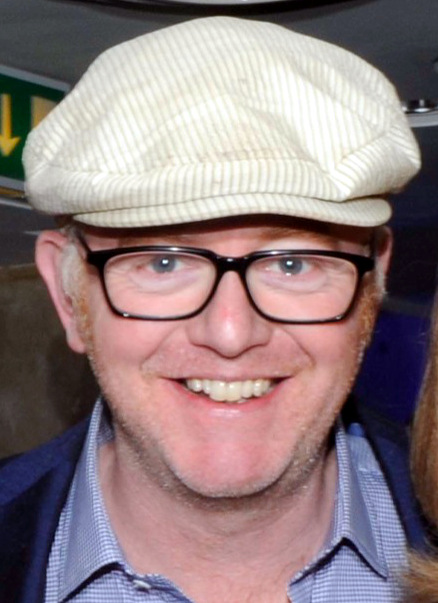
Chris Evans, 2010

- Rick Astley (born 1966), singer and radio DJ
- Thomas Dallam (1570–1614), organ builder and Elizabethan trade envoy to Constantinople. His family came from Dallam.
- Jack Wilson (1894–1970), partner in Wilson, Keppel and Betty, a popular British music hall and vaudeville act
- George Formby (1904–1961), entertainer, lived for many years in Warrington and is buried in Warrington Cemetery, with his father George Formby Sr, also an entertainer
- Edwin 'Ted' Astley (1922 in Warrington – 1998), composer, notably the themes to The Saint and Danger Man
- Edna Savage (1936–2000), traditional pop singer
- Tim Curry (1946-2026), actor, singer and composer, lived in Grappenhall
- Pete Waterman (born 1947), record producer, businessman, lives in south Warrington, near Daresbury
- John Maines (born 1948), musician, trombone player and active figure in the British brass band movement as a performer, conductor, tutor, compere and concert presenter
- Gareth Jones (born 1954), music producer and engineer notable for working with Depeche Mode
- Miles Tredinnick (born 1955), also known as Riff Regan rock musician, songwriter and screenwriter
- Phil Kelsall (born 1956 in Warrington), principal organist at the Blackpool Tower Ballroom since 1977
- Sir Stephen Hough (born 1961), international classical concert pianist and composer, raised in Warrington
- Tim Bowness (born 1963), singer-songwriter, singer in the band No-Man
- Ian Brown (born 1963), lead singer of The Stone Roses, now lives in Lymm
- Chris Evans (born 1966), DJ and TV presenter
- Anthony Whittaker (born 1968), classical composer and pianist, born in Warrington
- Jan Linton (born c. 1968), singer-songwriter, born in Warrington but re-located to Japan
- Chris Braide (born 1973), songwriter and record producer, now based in Malibu, born and lived in Padgate
- Kerry Katona (born 1980), singer, actress and TV personality, born and grew up in Warrington
- Bill Ryder-Jones (born 1983), singer-songwriter, musician and former guitarist of The Coral, born in Warrington
- Viola Beach (2013–2016), indie rock and indie pop band from Warrington

=== Sport ===
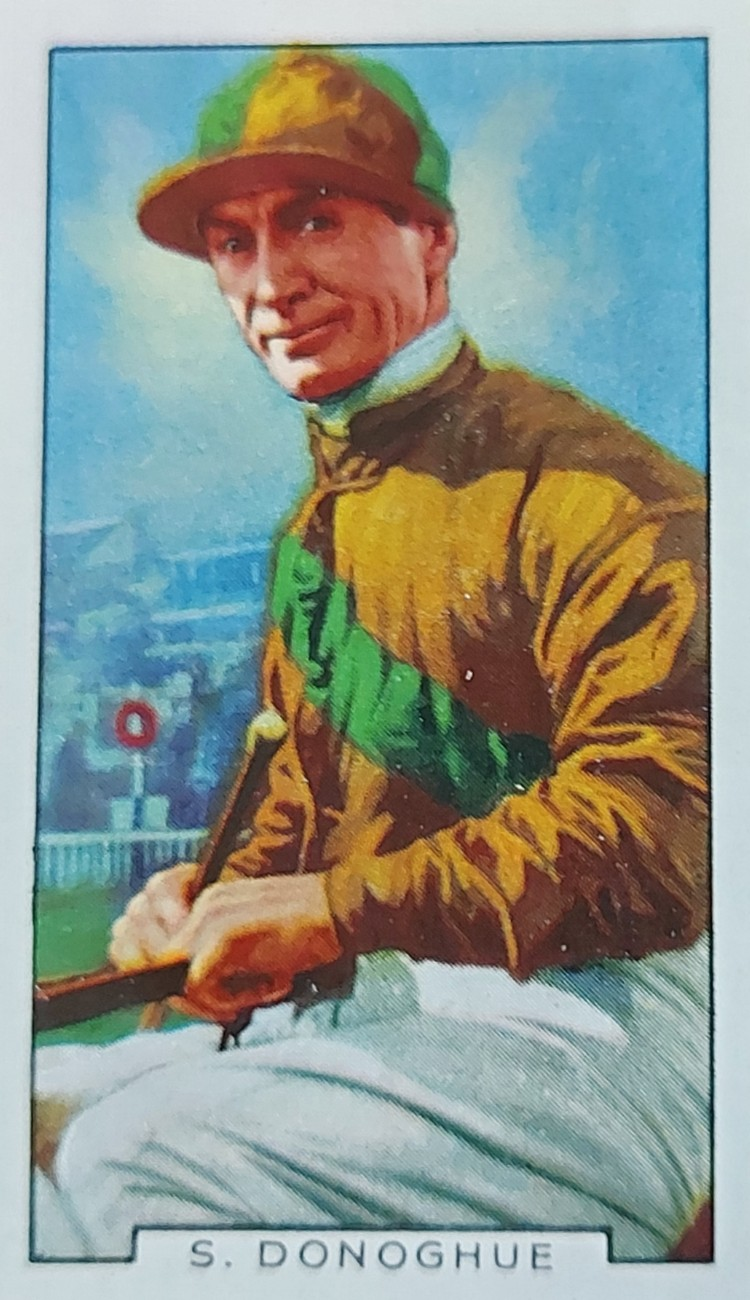
Steve Donoghue, 1936, on a cigarette card

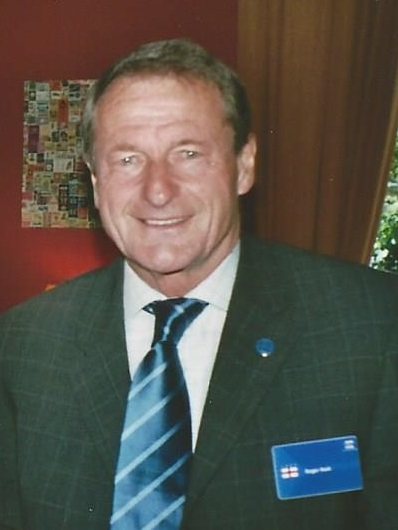
Roger Hunt, 2006

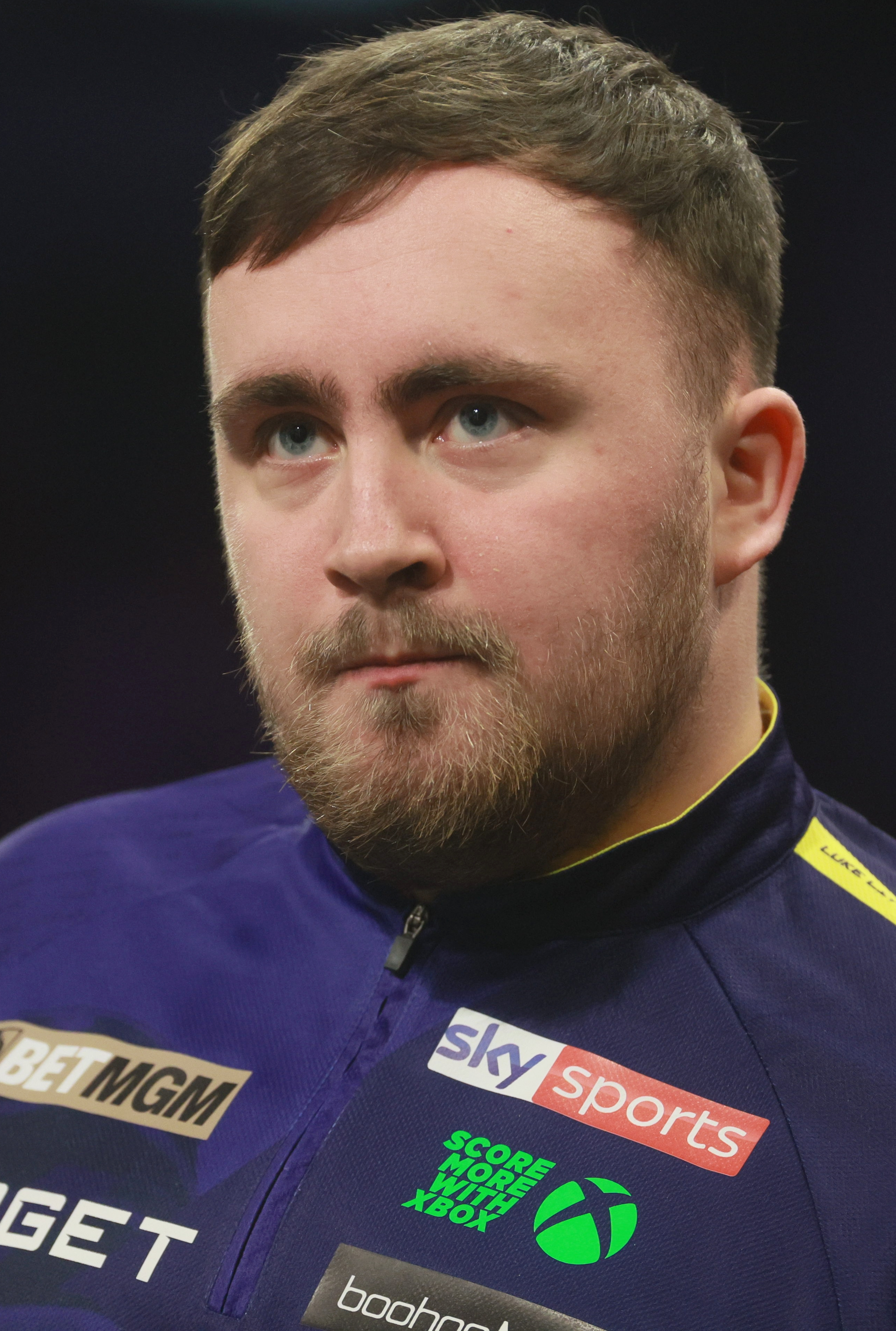
Luke Littler, 2025

- Steve Donoghue (1884–1945), jockey, ten times British flat racing Champion Jockey, born in Warrington
- Stan Woodhouse (1899 in Warrington – 1977), footballer, played 351 games for Southampton
- George Duckworth (1901–1966), first class cricketer, who played 24 test matches for England, was born in Warrington. He played first class cricket for Lancashire between 1923 and 1947.
- Hilda James (1904–1982) swimmer; team silver medallist at the 1920 Summer Olympics
- Fred Worrall (1910 in Warrington – 1979), footballer, played 431 games, mainly for Portsmouth
- Harold Palin (1916 in Warrington–1990), rugby league footballer, played 286 games; known as Moggy
- Laurie Gilfedder (1935 in Warrington – 2019), rugby league player, 468 games, mainly for Warrington Wolves
- Roger Hunt (1938-2021), footballer played 404 games for Liverpool F.C., and 34 for England, born in Glazebury, lived in Warrington, made a Freeman of the Borough in 2016
- Tommy Lawrence (1940–2018 in Warrington), Scottish footballer goalkeeper, 476 games, incl. 390 for Liverpool
- Neil McGrath (born 1942), former racing driver, competed in the British Touring Car Championship
- Bob Fulton (1947–2021), Australian Rugby League player and selector, born in Stockton Heath
- John Richards (born 1950 in Warrington) football striker, played 440 games, incl 385 for Wolves
- Keith Elwell (born 1950 in Warrington), rugby league footballer, played 591 games for Widnes Vikings
- John Bramhall (born 1956 in Warrington), footballer, over 530 games mainly for Tranmere Rovers and Bury
- Wade Dooley (born 1957), former rugby union international lock forward, played for his country 57 times
- Gary Bannister (born 1960 in Warrington), former footballer who played 539 games
- Neil Fairbrother (born 1963 in Warrington), first class cricketer, played 10 Test cricket matches for England,
- Johnny Smith (born 1965 in Warrington), wrestler, with All Japan Pro Wrestling
- Richard Egington (born 1979) rower, won two team medals at the 2008 & 2012 Summer Olympics
- Stephen Foster (born 1980), football defender, played 464 games; captain of Barnsley F.C., born in the town
- David Wright (born 1980 in Warrington), former professional footballer with 488 pro appearances
- Ian Sharps (born 1980 in Warrington), footballer played 562 games, now First-Team Coach at Walsall F.C.
- Paul Hanagan (born in 1980), twice British champion flat jockey, born in Warrington
- Matt Doughty (born 1981 in Warrington), former footballer, played over 410 games
- Jonathan Akinyemi (born 1988), Olympic Canoe Slalom athlete for team Nigeria, born and lives in Warrington
- James Chester (born 1989 in Warrington), footballer, played 424 games mainly for Hull City A.F.C.
- Carys Phillips (born 1992 in Warrington) a Welsh rugby union player, played 79 games for Wales women
- Jesse Lingard, (born 1992 in Warrington), footballer, played over 270 games and 32 for England
- Jack Robinson (born 1993 in Warrington), footballer, played about 300 games mainly for Sheffield United
- Joshua Brownhill (born 1995 in Warrington), footballer who has played over 400 games mainly for Burnley
- Luke Littler (born 2007), professional darts player; no.1 player with PDC World Darts Championship

=== Crime ===
- Garry Newlove (1959–2007 in Fearnhead), victim of high-profile murder in 2007, attacked outside his house
- Shafilea Ahmed (1986–2003 in Warrington), honour killing and filicide victim.
- Brianna Ghey (2006–2023 in Culcheth), murder victim

== Twin towns ==
Warrington is twinned with:

- Hilden, Germany
- Náchod, Czech Republic
- Česká Skalice, Czech Republic
- Červený Kostelec, Czech Republic
- Hronov, Czech Republic
- Jaroměř, Czech Republic
- Nové Město nad Metují, Czech Republic

The villages of Lymm and Culcheth, within the borough, are twinned respectively with these French communes:

- Meung-sur-Loire, France
- Saint-Leu-la-Foret, France

=== Former ===
- Lake County, Illinois, USA
- Zugdidi, Georgia

== Freedom of the Borough ==
The following people and military units have received the Freedom of the Borough of Warrington.

=== Individuals ===
- Doug Hoyle, November 2005
- Roger Hunt, December 2016

=== Military units ===
- The South Lancashire Regiment, September 1947
- The Queen's Lancashire Regiment, March 1970
- The Duke of Lancaster's Regiment, 2006
- 75 Engineer Regiment, 2013

== See also ==
- Warrington Dock
- Walton Lea Walled Garden
- Warrington power station
