= Bath Street drill hall =

Former military installation in Warrington, Cheshire

- Warrington
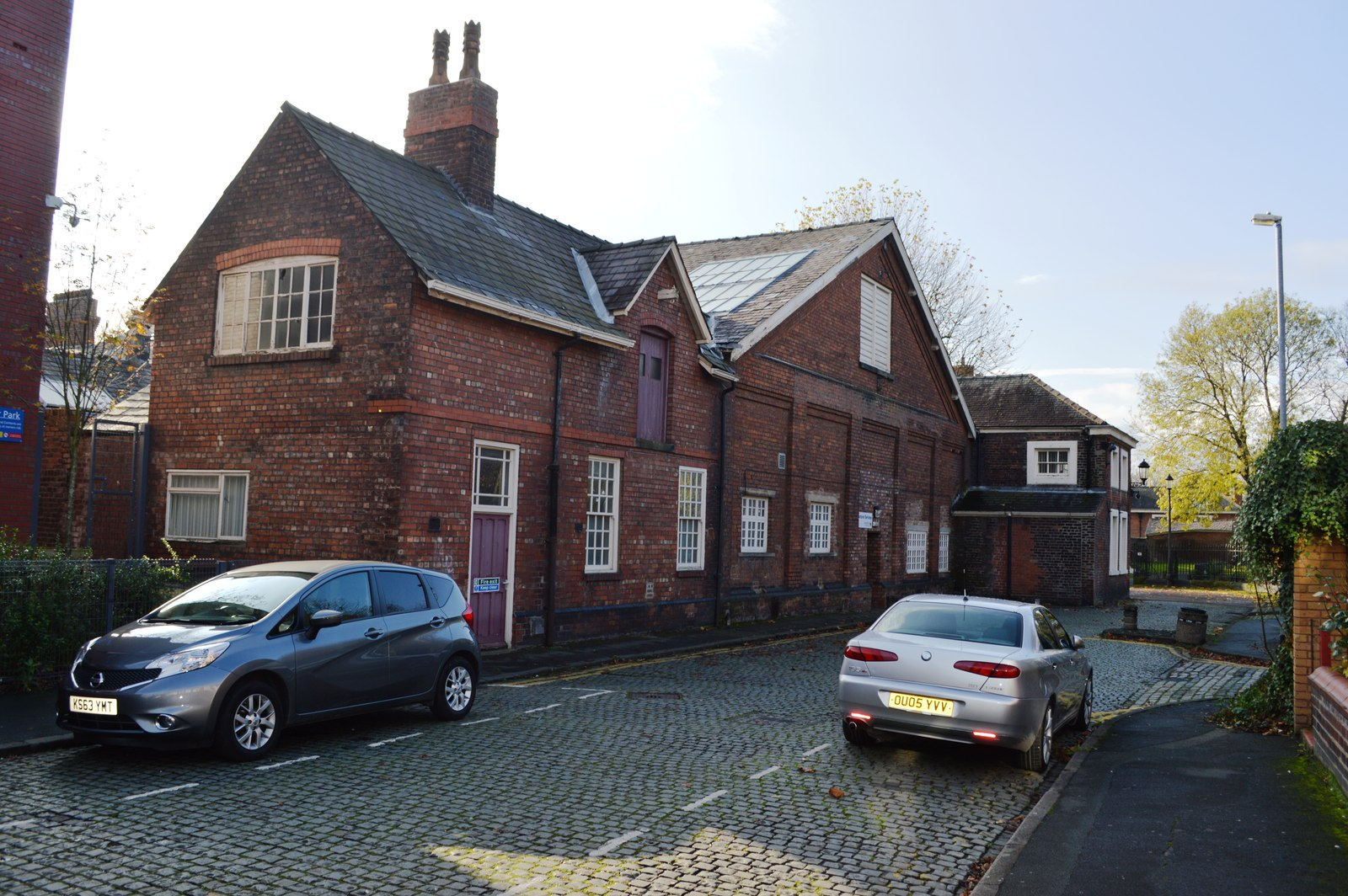
- Bath Street drill hall

Site information
- Type: Drill hall

Location
- Location within Cheshire
- Coordinates: 53.38990°N 2.59878°W

Site history
- Built: Late 19th century
- Built for: War Office
- In use: Late 19th century-1970s

The Bath Street drill hall is a former military installation in Warrington, Cheshire.

== History ==
The building was designed as the headquarters of the 1st Volunteer Battalion, The South Lancashire Regiment in the late 19th century. This unit evolved to become the 4th Battalion, The South Lancashire Regiment in 1908. The battalion was mobilised at the drill hall in August 1914 before being deployed to the Western Front and was still based there at the start of the Second World War. The battalion evolved to become the 1st Battalion, Lancastrian Volunteers in 1967 and the 5th/8th (Volunteer) Battalion, The King's Regiment (Liverpool) in 1975. The battalion moved to Peninsula Barracks, Warrington around the same time and the Bath Street drill hall was decommissioned and subsequently converted for use by the Electoral Services Department of Warrington Borough Council.
