= Centenary Theatre Company =

Theatre company based in Warrington, England

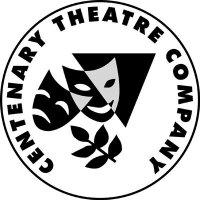
Centenary Theatre Logo

Centenary Theatre Company is a theatre company based in Warrington, Cheshire. They are one of the longest established theatre companies in North West of England. The name of the Company has changed several times over the years, with the original company being established in 1901.

Centenary perform four productions each performance season including musicals and plays. The company also performs concerts in aid of local charities.

Centenary Theatre Company is a registered charity in the U.K.

Membership to the company is not based on artistic ability. Only if members wish to perform in productions is any audition required. Centenary is also affiliated to the National Operatic and Dramatic Association (NODA). The group performs at The Brindley in Runcorn.

== History of Centenary ==
The origins of the Company can be traced back to 1901 and the forming of a ladies' choral society, which was augmented by a drama group in 1904. By 1907 the Operatic and Dramatic Society took the form seen today, with the Crosfield family taking a very active part. The Society’s first full-scale musical was in 1907 with the presentation of Gilbert and Sullivan's Trial by Jury.

Earlier choral and dramatic productions were performed in the then newly built Crosfield Assembly Hall, which now forms part of the ground floor of the Crosfield General Office Building. In later years, musical shows were transferred to the Parr Hall, and then on to the Royal Court Theatre, now lost with its site being occupied today by the Warrington Information Offices. Crosfields celebrated their 100 years of soap making (1815–1915), and marked this several years later by building the Centenary Theatre. The Society’s first production, in the main body of the hall (the stage had not been built yet!), was The Princess of Kensington. One year later in 1925, came the first full stage production in the theatre, The Geisha Girl.

The Company's activities were suspended for World War II, as indeed it had been for World War I. Prior to 1940 the musical productions had consisted primarily of one, two or three main scenes incorporating a large chorus that remained on stage for up to 75% of the time. In the late 1940s a change came about with the arrival of bigger, more glamorous, and ever costlier shows – demanding more efficient detail and stage effects.

One such show was The Desert Song, performed by the Society in 1947, which proved to be one of the group's greater successes, particularly in terms of attendance figures, playing to full houses – including the Saturday afternoon matinée.

During this period amateur theatre in general was booming and continued to do so for many years. The Company flourished and was able to support various charities with donations amounting to many thousands of pounds.

The company has now completed in excess of 130 musical shows since the first one back in those early days of 1907 – with two shows every year from 1961 onwards. They also produce two plays each year and these have included a wide variety of plays including classic drama; farce; comedy and ‘whodunits’.

In 1984 the Society changed its name from 'Crosfields' to 'Centenary Operatic and Dramatic Society' – named after the theatre where all productions were then staged. The Centenary Theatre closed in 1991. The last musical there was Cabaret and the last play was Hindle Wakes. Later on that year the group returned to the Parr Hall – after decades away – with Carousel.

In 2005 Centenary moved again to a new purpose built theatre - Runcorn's Brindley Theatre. To coincide with the move to a professional venue, Centenary Operatic and Dramatic Society changed its name to Centenary Theatre Company.
