= Dawsons Music =

UK retailer of instruments and audio products

Dawsons
- Trade name: Dawsons Music Co. / Dawsons
- Company type: Private
- Industry: Musical instruments
- Founded: 1898; 128 years ago (original); 2023 (relaunch)
- Founder: John Dawson
- Products: Musical instruments and consumer audio equipment
- Owner: Vista Musical Instruments
- Website: dawsons.co.uk

Dawsons Music & Sound, often referred to as Dawsons or Dawsons Music, was a musical instrument and consumer audio retailer with headquarters based in Haydock, Merseyside, England.

== History ==
Dawsons Music was established in 1898 in Warrington by John Dawson, a piano tuner, who opened the shop to cater for growing demand from people wanting to buy new instruments.

The company was owned by CH & JA Dawson Ltd until 1980, when it was purchased by Thomas David Briggs MBE. In 2010, Mr Briggs was appointed Lord Lieutenant of Cheshire, responsible for a range of civic duties in the Cheshire region. Thereafter in 2011, Mark Taylor was appointed as Dawsons' new managing director. His appointment made him only the fifth managing director in the company's 115-year history.

In 2014, Dawsons announced its trading results over the 2013 Christmas period were the strongest in its history, and it became one of the first retailers in the UK to report how sales from mobile devices were quickly catching up with sales from traditional online sources.

In November 2018, the Briggs family sold all interest in Dawsons Music to turn-around specialist SKG Capital.

In March 2019 Dawsons announced that they will close their Warrington store, ending its 121-year retail presence in the town and also its Altrincham and Huddersfield outlets.

September 2019 saw announcements by Dawsons Music with regards to the termination of their recently promoted CEO, Mark Taylor, and also the sale of their Sankey Street head office and subsequent relocation to Centre Park. As well as the new headquarters the company revealed an updated logo and their ambitious plans for the future.

On 20 April 2020, the board of Dawsons Music filed a Notice Of Intent to appoint Administrators (NOI), and KPMG was later appointed financial control of the business as it entered administration.

On 20 May 2020, it was announced that a new buyer for the business had been found, Andrew M. Oliver, and the company traded under the name Dawsons Music & Sound Ltd. In July 2020 the company moved into a new head office and warehouse location in Haydock, Merseyside.

Due to challenging trading conditions - including the Covid pandemic, reduced high street footfall, increased online competition, and management difficulties - Dawsons entered administration again on 1 September 2021, with all stores closing as a result. The company ceased trading and was officially dissolved 1 December 2022.

In June 2023 the company was acquired by Vista Musical Instruments based in Singapore. Vista Musical Instruments which is owned by the parent company of NME and in July 2023 it was announced that NME would relaunch its print issue which would be able to be purchased in August through Dawsons.

=== 2011 England riots ===
Dawsons' Manchester store was one of many United Kingdom city centre locations hit by the 2011 England riots. Thousands of pounds worth of musical instruments and equipment was stolen, and the store was heavily damaged.

=== Dawsons and Farida Guitars ===
In 2004, Dawsons began working with Farida Guitars as the sole UK distributor. Through its association with Dawsons, Farida established relationships with artists like Frank Turner, Bombay Bicycle Club and The Vaccines, creating limited edition 'signature' guitars for each artist.
