= Warrington Guardian =

- Type: Weekly newspaper
- Owner: Newsquest
- Founded: 1853
- Circulation: 5,977 (as of 2024)
- Website: warringtonguardian.co.uk

The Warrington Guardian is a local newspaper that has been published in Warrington, England, since 1853, originally published weekly on Saturdays. In 1856 it was bought by Alexander Mackie, who used it as a springboard to establish a number of other "Guardian" titles in Cheshire: the Northwich Guardian in 1861, the Altrincham Guardian in 1862, the Crewe Guardian in 1863, and the Chester Guardian in 1867. By 1859 the Warrington Guardian had a circulation of 2,200. As of 2013 the paper is owned by Newsquest.

== Former journalists ==
- John Ray, BAFTA-winning ITV News correspondent. He was formerly Africa Correspondent, Middle East Correspondent and was the first Western TV journalist to report from inside Syria's borders at the start of the war.
- Rebekah Brooks (née Wade) (born 1968), British media executive and the first woman editor of The Sun newspaper.
