= History of Warrington =

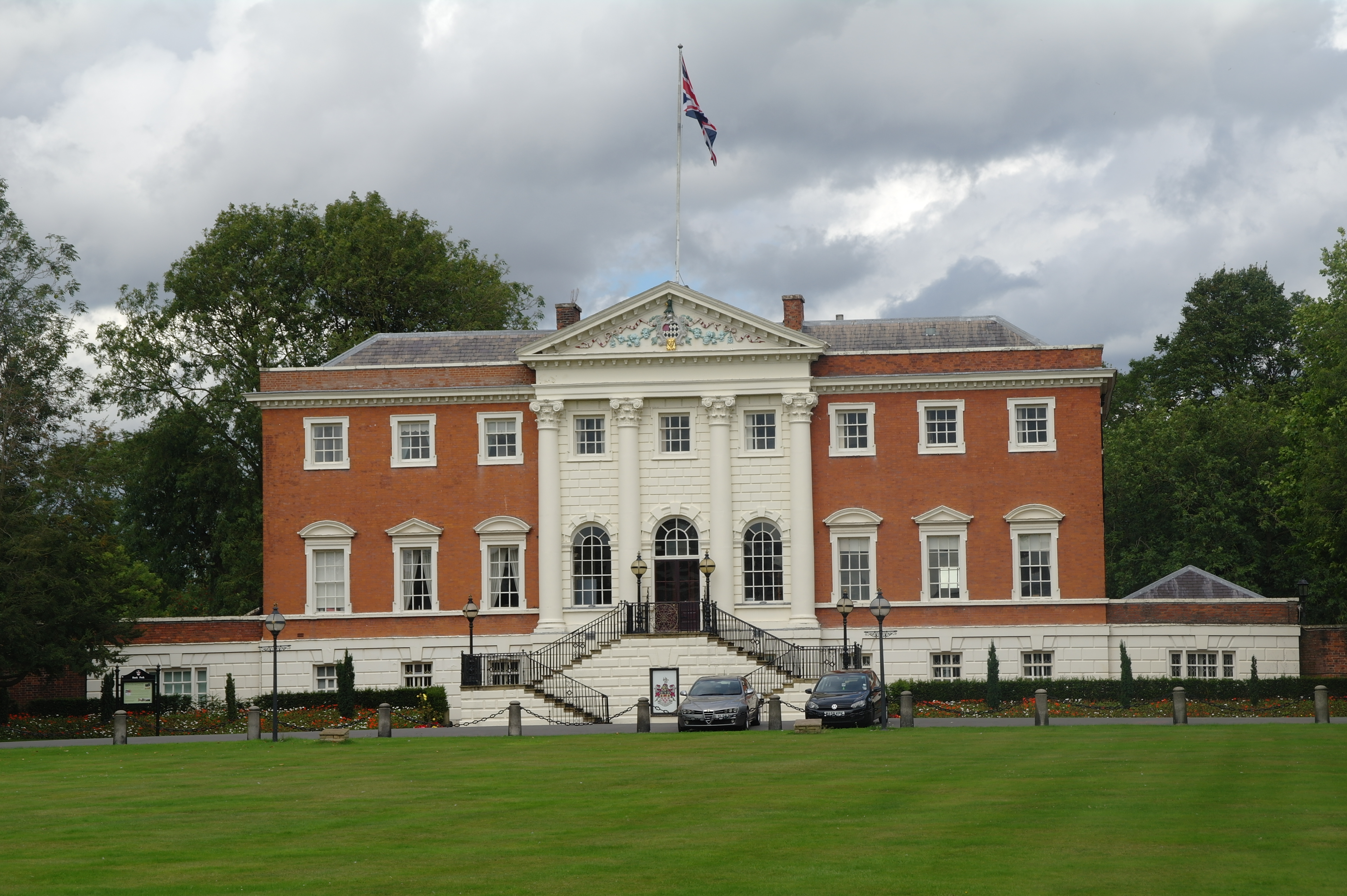
Warrington Town Hall

The history of Warrington began when it was founded by the Romans at an important crossing place on the River Mersey. The Roman name for the settlement is not known but there is speculation that it could have been Veratinum which is listed as a Roman habitation in the area during the occupation period. A new settlement was established by the Saxon Wærings. By the Middle Ages, Warrington had emerged as a market town at the lowest bridging point of the river. A local tradition of textile and tool production dates from this time. The expansion and urbanisation of Warrington coincided with the Industrial Revolution, particularly after the Mersey was made navigable in the 18th century. Warrington became a manufacturing town and a centre of steel (particularly wire), textiles, brewing, tanning and chemical industries.

== Early history ==
Warrington has been a major crossing point on the River Mersey since ancient times and there was a Roman settlement at Wilderspool. Local archaeological evidence indicates that there were Bronze Age settlements also. In medieval times Warrington's importance was as a market town and bridging point of the River Mersey. The first reference to a bridge at Warrington is found in 1285. The origin of the modern town was located in the area around St Elphin's Church, now included in the Church Street Conservation Area, established whilst the main river crossing was via a ford approximately 1 km upriver of Warrington Bridge.

== English Civil War ==
Warrington was a fulcrum in the English Civil War. The armies of Oliver Cromwell and the Earl of Derby both stayed near the old town centre (the parish church area). Popular legend has it that Cromwell lodged near the building which survives on Church Street as the Cottage Restaurant. The Marquis of Granby public house bears a plaque stating that the Earl of Derby 'had his quarters near this site'. Dents in the walls of the parish church are rumoured to have been caused by the cannons from the time of the civil war. On 13 August 1651 Warrington was the scene of the last Royalist victory of the civil war when Scots troops under Charles II and David Leslie, Lord Newark, fought Parliamentarians under John Lambert at the Battle of Warrington Bridge.

== Industrial history ==
The expansion and urbanisation of Warrington largely coincided with the Industrial Revolution, particularly after the Mersey was made navigable in the 18th century. As Britain became industrialised, Warrington embraced the Industrial Revolution becoming a manufacturing town and a centre of steel (particularly wire), textiles, brewing, tanning and chemical industries. The navigational properties of the River Mersey were improved, canals were built, and the town grew yet more prosperous and popular. When the age of steam came, Warrington naturally welcomed it, both as a means of transport and as a source of power for its mills.

=== Wire manufacture ===
The importance of this industry to the town is reflected in the nickname "The Wire" given to both Warrington's Rugby League and Football clubs. This name was also adopted by the Independent Local Radio station Wire FM. Rylands Brothers one of the main wire businesses was based on the eastern side of the town centre with its offices and laboratory on Church Street.

=== Brewing and distilling ===
Two large operations dominated the brewing industry of 19th and 20th century Warrington, Greenalls of Wilderspool and Walkers of Winwick Road. Greenalls were also heavily involved in distilling gin and later vodka. Greenalls ceased brewing in 1990 and gradually refocussed on its hotel business changing its name to the De Vere Group in 2000. Former Greenalls employees founded the Coach House Brewery in 1991, whilst the historic brewery site was designated a Conservation Area and redeveloped. Walkers merged with Tetley's Brewery in 1960 to become part of Tetley Walker. The brewery closed in 1996 and is now the site of the Halliwell Jones Stadium, home of Warrington Wolves, as well as a Tesco store.

=== Tanning ===
Tanning began in the town centre but by the mid-19th century had largely moved to larger premises on the outskirts.

=== Chemical industries ===
The factory established by Joseph Crosfield at Bank Quay in 1815 for soap manufacture is still in use today as part of Unilever. To link two parts of the factory complex on opposite sides of the River Mersey, two Transporter bridges were constructed in the early 20th century. The second of these survives and is a Grade II* listed building and Scheduled monument.

=== Other manufacturing ===
Warrington's diverse industrial base also included the manufacture of furniture at the Garnett Cabinet Works, home appliances at the Richmond works in Latchford, and metal files.

=== Shipbuilding ===
The area around Bank Quay was the home to a shipyard until the limitations of the Mersey became apparent as vessel dimensions grew. The ill-fated iron hulled clipper RMS Tayleur was launched on 4 October 1853 only to sink on her maiden voyage.

== Second World War ==
Warrington was the location of RAF Station Burtonwood Burtonwood RAF base. During World War II, it served as the largest US Army Air Force airfield outside the United States, and was visited by major American celebrities like Humphrey Bogart and Bob Hope who entertained the GIs. The RAF station continued in use by the USAAF and subsequently USAF as a staging post for men and material until its closure in 1993.

== Post-war expansion ==
Warrington was designated a new town in 1968 and consequently the town grew in size, with the Birchwood area being developed on the former ROF Risley site. Heavy industry declined in the 1970s and 1980s but the growth of the new town led to a great increase in employment in light industry, distribution and technology.

== IRA bombing ==
On 20 March 1993, the Provisional Irish Republican Army (IRA) detonated two bombs in Warrington town centre. The blasts killed two children: three-year-old Johnathan Ball died instantly, and twelve-year-old Tim Parry, from the Great Sankey area died five days later in hospital. Around 56 other people were injured, four seriously. Their deaths provoked widespread condemnation of the organisation responsible. The blast followed a bomb attack a few weeks earlier on a gas-storage plant in Warrington.

Tim Parry's father Colin Parry founded The Tim Parry Johnathan Ball Foundation for Peace (known as the Peace Centre) as part of a campaign to reconcile communities in conflict. The centre opened on the seventh anniversary of the bombing, 20 March 2000. He and his family still live in the town.

== Other history ==
In 1981, Warrington was the first place to field a candidate for the then newly formed Social Democratic Party; former Home Secretary Roy Jenkins stood for Parliament but lost to Labour Party candidate Doug Hoyle by a small number of votes.

There was a RAF training camp at Padgate, a Royal Naval air base at Appleton Thorn (RNAS Stretton) and an army base at the Peninsula Barracks in O'Leary Street, now used by the Army Reserve.

In October 1987, Swedish home products retailer IKEA opened its first British store in the Burtonwood area of the town, bringing more than 200 retail jobs to the area.

The first MMR vaccine to be administered in the UK was given by Dr Benjamin Paterson at Warrington General Hospital in 1971.

== Bibliography ==
- Beamont, William (1872). Annals of the Lords of Warrington for the first five centuries after the conquest. Vol. 1. Manchester: The Chetham Society..
- Beamont, William (1872). Annals of the Lords of Warrington for the first five centuries after the conquest. Vol. 2. Manchester: The Chetham Society..

== See also ==
- History of Cheshire
- History of Lancashire
