= Listed buildings in Warrington (unparished area) =

Warrington is a town, borough and unitary authority area of Cheshire, England. The unitary authority contains 18 civil parishes, which are distributed around its periphery. Its central area, including the town, is unparished. This list contains the 140 structures in the unparished area that are designated by English Heritage as listed buildings and included in the National Heritage List for England. Of these, three buildings are listed at Grade I, and ten at Grade II*. The remaining buildings are listed at Grade II. The listed buildings in the civil parishes are included in separate lists.

== Key ==
Grade	Criteria
Grade I	Buildings of exceptional interest, sometimes considered to be internationally important.
Grade II*	Particularly important buildings of more than special interest.
Grade II	Buildings of national importance and special interest.

== Buildings ==
Name and location	Photograph	Date	Notes	Grade
St Elphin's Church; 53.3910°N 2.5799°W		14th century	The earliest fabric in the church dates from the 14th century. Following damage in the Civil War, the tower was rebuilt in 1696 and the nave in 1770. The south aisle was added in the early 19th century. Most of the fabric of the present church results from an extensive restoration between 1859 and 1867 by Frederick and Horace Francis, during which the spire was added. The spire is 281 feet (86 m) high, and one of the highest in England. The north transept forms the regimental chapel of the South Lancashire Regiment.	II*
Barley Mow Public House; 53.3899°N 2.5946°W		1561	A timber-framed public house that has been much altered. The front facing Market Place is in elaborate black-and-white work, including quatrefoils, standing on a red sandstone plinth. It is in three storeys, including two jettied gables, and two continuous rows of small-pane windows. Inside the public house is a mixture of original 17th-century and later panelling.	II*
Black Horse Public House; 53.3833°N 2.6226°W		1632	Originating as a yeoman's house, this is basically timber-framed, with subsequent restoration and modernisation. It has an L-shaped plan, and an upper cruck is visible in the cross-wing. The other wing is later, in rendered brick, possibly on timber framing. This wing is in two storeys, and the roofs are slated.	II
Cromwell's House; 53.3905°N 2.5833°W		17th century	This probably originated as a single house, later divided into three cottages. It is timber-framed with painted brick infill on a stone plinth. There are two storeys, the upper storey being jettied. The windows are casements with wooden mullions. At the rear are single-storey extensions, and three half-dormers.	II*
Marquis of Granby Public House; 53.3899°N 2.5845°W		1660	A timber-framed two-storey public house with cement infill on a stone plinth, and a slate roof, it has been restored since it was built. The right hand gable is roughcast. The former stables have been used as a shoe repair workshop. The windows are casements.	II
Bull's Head Public House; 53.3897°N 2.5857°W		1685	Later restored, the public house is in two storeys. The front is rendered, and the roof is in slate. The windows are restored casements.	II
Unitarian Church; 53.3885°N 2.5949°W		1745	A rectangular brick Unitarian chapel on a stone plinth with a slate roof. Originally the pulpit was on the west wall opposite an east gallery. The chapel was reorientated in 1863, the gallery was removed, and the seating was turned to face the north. Two south entrances were created; each has a Doric doorcase, and between these is a round-headed window. Inside the chapel are wall monuments dating from the 18th century.	II
Town Hall; 53.3897°N 2.5997°W		1750	Designed by James Gibbs as a country house, named Bank House, for Thomas Patten, this in Palladian style. It has three storeys and a hipped slate roof. The house is constructed in red brick and rusticated stone. In the centre is full-height portico with Composite columns carrying a pediment bearing the arms of the Patten family. The entrance is in the middle storey and is approached by a double staircase.	I
Eastern Outbuilding, Town Hall; 53.3898°N 2.5990°W		1750	This was built as offices for Bank Hall, later used by the local authority. The building has a three-bay rusticated and pedimented centre, and five brick bays on each side.	I
Western Outbuilding, Town Hall; 53.3897°N 2.6003°W		1750	This was built as stables for Bank Hall, later used as offices by the local authority. The building has a three-bay rusticated and pedimented centre, and three brick bays on each side.	I
Lamps, Town Hall Drive; 53.38923°N 2.60011°W	—	1750	There are lamps part-way down the east and west drives leading to the Town Hall that were designed by James Gibbs.	II*
2 and 4 Dial Street; 53.3901°N 2.5885°W	—	18th century	A pair of houses in brick on a stone plinth in two storeys. Steps lead up to the doorways, each of which have panelled pilasters, a frieze, a cornice, and a fanlight. The windows are sashes.	II
131 and 133 Church Street; 53.3910°N 2.5805°W		18th century	Originally two brick houses, in two low storeys. Number 131 is now part of the Ring o' Bells Public House; number 133 is known as Church House.	II
484 Knutsford Road; 53.3821°N 2.5736°W	—	18th century	A detached house in brick with a slate roof. It is in two storeys and also has cellars. In the centre is a door with a round-headed fanlight. The windows are sashes.	II
13 Market Place; 53.3899°N 2.5948°W	—	18th century	A three-storey house in brick, once the solicitor's office of William Beamont, who became the first mayor of Warrington. On the ground floor are a modern shop window and doorway, a sash window and a Neoclassical doorway; the last includes pilasters, and a frieze with triglyphs and metopes. The upper storeys also contain sash windows.	II
86 Sankey Street; 53.3888°N 2.5981°W		18th century	This was built as a detached house, later used as a Health Office. It is constructed in brick on a stone plinth, and is in three storeys. The central doorway is flanked by Roman Doric columns, and above it is a semicircular fanlight. The windows are sashes.	II
Bank House and Borough Treasurer's Office; 53.3887°N 2.5985°W	—	18th century	This building originated as two houses, built in brick, with slate roofs. It is in two and three storeys, There are two projections to the front. One is semi-hexagonal, the other semicircular with a hipped roof. The windows are sashes.	II
Black Bear Public House; 53.3820°N 2.5731°W		18th century	The public house has been altered since it was built, and is now pebbledashed with a slate roof. It is in two low storeys. The windows are sashes.	II
Blue Bell Inn; 53.3900°N 2.5937°W		18th century	The inn was extended in the 19th century. It is constructed in brick with slate roofs. The older part is in two storeys, and contains a pilastered doorway with a fanlight. The newer part is in three storeys, an contains a shop front. The windows are sashes.	II
Horsemarket Chambers; 53.3904°N 2.5932°W	—	18th century	The brick-built building with a slate roof was much altered in the 19th century, but has retained its 18th-century rear façade. This is in three storeys and six bays, with a central two-storey bay projecting forward and incorporating a Venetian window. There is also a pedimented Doric doorcase. The street front contains a row of 19th-century shops.	II
Ring o' Bells Public House; 53.3910°N 2.5808°W		18th century	A brick public house in two storeys, with a single-storey wing to the right. On the front is a wide gable with bargeboards. The windows are sashes.	II
Theatre Tavern; 53.3909°N 2.5931°W		18th century	This was originally built as a house, and was converted into a public house in the 19th century. It is constructed in brick on a stone plinth. It stands on the corner of Winwick Street and Scotland Road, with a door on the angle.	II
Vicarage, Sankey Street; 53.3889°N 2.5978°W	—	18th century	The building originated as a vicarage, and was later used as the Education Office. It is a detached house in three storeys, constructed in brick on a stone plinth. The doorway is flanked by Roman Doric columns, above which is a pediment and a semicircular fanlight. The windows are sashes.	II
Wilderspool House; 53.3748°N 2.5845°W	—	18th century	Built for the Greenall family, brewers, and occupied by them until the 1830s, later their manager's house. Extended and converted into offices in 1980. The house is in two storeys, with a front of seven bays. It is constructed in brick, most of which is stuccoed, with ashlar dressings, and slate roofs. It has a central cupola with round columns, a domed top and a ball finial. Most of the windows are sashes, and there are also bay windows, four on the front, and one on the rear. On the left side is a Doric portico.	II
86 and 86a Church Street; 53.3905°N 2.5836°W	—	18th century (probable)	In whitewashed brick, with a brick band, the building is in two storeys. It has two doors, and two windows on each floor. Part of it has been used as a shop.	II
46 Marsh House Lane; 53.3971°N 2.5756°W	—	18th century (probable)	Originating as a farmhouse, the building is in painted brick with a slate roof. It has two storeys, with a single-storey extension on the left, and a former barn on the right. The windows are sliding sashes, and in the wall is a bee bole. In front of the building is a cobbled yard.	II
45 Bridge Street; 53.3882°N 2.5928°W	—	Mid-18th century	A three-storey building in brick with a slate roof, a stone parapet, string courses, and quoins. In the ground floor is a 19th-century shop front. Above are sash windows.	II
3 and 5 Winwick Street; 53.3910°N 2.5932°W	—	Mid-18th century	This originated as a house, and has since been converted into offices. It is in three storeys, constructed in brick on a stone base, with a stone cornice and a slate roof. The doorcase has a pediment and a fanlight. The windows are sashes.	II
Chetham House; 53.4092°N 2.5816°W	—	Mid-18th century	A brick house on a stoneplinth in three storeys with stone quoins. The gable ends are roughcast. The windows are a mixture of sashes and casements. The gates and gate piers are included in the listing.	II
25–29 Stanley Street; 53.3865°N 2.5950°W	—	Mid-to late 18th century	Originally three houses, later converted into offices. They are built in brick on stone plinths, and have slate roofs. They are in three storeys with sash windows.	II
Warrington Academy; 53.3862°N 2.5923°W		1757 or earlier	The Old Academy at Warrington is a three-storey red brick Grade II listed building, constructed circa 1745 at the lower end of Bridge Street (originally called Bridgefoot). The academy provided education for Dissenters, who were not allowed to attend a university; its tutors included Joseph Priestley. The building is in brick with stone dressings and a slate roof. It includes a porch with Doric style columns, and sash windows. This 600 tonne building was moved a distance of 19m on new underpinned reinforced concrete foundations as part of a road widening scheme. A moving operation was engineered by Holdsworth and achieved by the contractors Pynford using a novel combination of high-pressure grease and ‘Floatpads’, manufactured by Glover Engineering of Manchester. On 21 May 1981, 'Floatpads’ and high-pressure grease were first used together in moving this 600 tonne building, which was the heaviest to be moved to that date in Britain. Subsequently, an extension was built on the west side of the building in matching style and brickwork.	II
Holy Trinity Church; 53.3894°N 2.5917°W		1758	This is a Georgian church designed in the style of James Gibbs. Its front is in sandstone, the back in brick with stone dressings. A clock tower was added to the west of the church in 1862. Further alterations were made during the 20th century. Features include a Doric doorcase, with Ionic pilasters above, a cornice and a plain parapet. In the east wall is a Venetian window.	II*
80 Buttermarket Street; 53.3897°N 2.5896°W		Late 18th century	This is a house with a school added to the rear. It is constructed in brick with a slate roof, and has two storeys. The entrance is flanked by Roman Doric columns, and above it is a pediment and a semicircular fanlight. The windows are sashes.	II
25–31 Church Street; 53.3897°N 2.5860°W	—	Late 18th century	A terrace of four brick houses with a stone base and band. They are in two storeys with a slate roof. The doorways are surrounded by Tuscan pilasters, a cornice and a segmental fanlight. The windows are sashes.	II
562–568 Knutsford Road; 53.3815°N 2.5694°W	—	Late 18th century	This is a terrace of four cottages, built in brick with slate roofs. They are in two low storeys, and each cottage has a plain door, and in each floor is a two-light casement window.	II
8 Market Place; 53.3898°N 2.5947°W	—	Late 18th century	This is a brick building in three storeys that originated as a public house. The ground floor is modern. On the right return is a doorway with a fanlight. All the windows are sashes.	II
2 Westford Road; 53.3713°N 2.5989°W	—	Late 18th century	A farm cottage, built in brick, with a slate roof. It is in two storeys, with pilasters at the ends, and five-light casement windows in both floors.	II
Lion Hotel; 53.3877°N 2.5926°W	—	Late 18th century	This replaced an earlier 17th-century licensed building. At the end of the 18th century it was the most important coaching inn in the town. It is constructed in brick with a slate roof, and has long-and-short quoins. The ground floor is faced in terracotta. The windows are sashes.	II
Cheshire Cheese Public House; 53.3812°N 2.5661°W	—	Late 18th century (probable)	The public house formerly incorporated stables, and has an L-plan. It is constructed in brick, painted white, and has a slate roof. The public house is in two storeys. The windows are sashes, including one horizontally sliding sash window, and there is also a small stable door.	II
3–9 China Lane; 53.3759°N 2.5830°W	—	Late 18th century (probable)	A row of low two-storey brick cottages. They have segmental arched doorways and sash windows.	II
39–49 Bewsey Street; 53.3920°N 2.5958°W	—	1776	A terrace of six houses in Georgian style. They are constructed in brick and are in three storeys. Above each door is a rectangular fanlight. Most of the windows are sashes.	II
51–61 Bewsey Street; 53.3922°N 2.5962°W	—	c. 1776 (probable)	A terrace of six houses in Georgian style. They are constructed in brick, some of which are stuccoed, and are in two storeys. The windows are sashes.	II
63–67 Bewsey Street; 53.3924°N 2.5964°W	—	c. 1776 (probable)	A terrace of three houses in Georgian style that were restored in 1973 in their original style. There are three pedimented doorways.	II
Holly House; 53.3885°N 2.5977°W	—	1790	A house in late Georgian style, later used as offices. It is constructed in brick with a slate roof, and has two storeys. Features include upswept parapets, a stone cornice at eaves level, a doorway surrounded by Roman Doric columns and pilasters, a frieze and a semicircular fanlight, and sash windows.	II
Gateway, St Elphin's Church; 53.39113°N 2.58053°W	—	1791	The gateway consists of a pair of cast iron gates under a curved arch between stone rusticated piers. The piers have a cornice surmounted by urns. Flanking the central gates are smaller gates for pedestrians.	II
82 and 84 Buttermarket Street; 53.3897°N 2.5894°W		Late 18th to early 19th century	A pair of houses in brick with a slate roof. The houses are in three storeys, with sash windows. The door of number 82 is flanked by fluted Roman Doric columns, and has a semicircular fanlight. Number 84 has a 19th-century stone porch.	II
55 Long Lane; 53.4081°N 2.5865°W	—	Late 18th to early 19th century	A house built in brick, later roughcast, with a slate roof. It is in two low storeys, and has casement windows with louvred shutters. Attached to the left is a former stable with a hipped roof, later used as a workshop.	II
Presbyterian Chapel; 53.3934°N 2.5935°W	—	1807	This started as a chapel for the Countess of Huntingdon's Connexion, and became a Presbyterian chapel in 1854, and the west front added. It is in Italianate style. The west front is stuccoed, and has a pediment with a round window, below which are round-headed windows and two round-headed doorways. The sides are in brick, with two storeys and five round-headed windows. The building has since been used for business purposes.	II
Presbytery, St Alban's Church; 53.3931°N 2.5967°W	—	1808	The presbytery is attached to the rear of St Alban's Church. It is constructed in brick and has two storeys, it has a plain door with a fanlight and a later doorway with a segmental arch. The windows are sashes. The presbytery was altered in 1893.	II
Building dated 1817; 53.3901°N 2.5887°W	—	1817	A building with two high storeys, the lower storey being roughcast, the upper storey painted brick. The Dial Street front has an open pedimented gable. There are three windows in the upper storey, the centre window being round-arched, the two flanking windows flat-headed. In the Naylor Street side are more round-arched windows.	II
St Alban's Church; 53.3930°N 2.5970°W		1823	Designed by Edward Alcock, this replaced an earlier Roman Catholic chapel nearby. It was altered in 1893 by Peter Paul Pugin, who added an apsidal sanctuary. The west façade, with its three round-arched windows and pedimented gable, followed in 1909. There is a small five-sided baptistry on the northwest corner of the church.	II
115 and 117 Bewsey Road; 53.3963°N 2.6043°W	—	1825	A pair of houses in three storeys, constructed in brick with a slate roof. It has a stone plinth, string course, and a cornice at the level of the eaves. Features include sash windows, fluted columns, and iron balconies.	II
72 and 74 Bewsey Street; 53.3928°N 2.5980°W	—	Early 19th century	These appear to have originated as three houses, with the former number 70 being incorporated into number 72. They are in three storeys, constructed in brick, with a stone band between the bottom and middle storeys. There are three doors with round-arched fanlights, and the windows are sashes.	II
9–11 Market Place; 53.3898°N 2.5947°W	—	Early 19th century	The brick building is in three storeys with a stone band above the ground floor, which contains modern shop fronts. At eaves level is a modillioned cornice. The windows are sashes.	II
Farm cottages, 1–3 Vale Owen Road; 53.4063°N 2.5782°W	—	Early 19th century	Three farm cottages, constructed in brick, with two low storeys. Number 1 is rendered. Number 2 has horizontally sliding sash windows; the other windows are modern.	II
General Wolfe Public House; 53.3904°N 2.5837°W		Early 19th century	A public house in brick with a slate roof, in two storeys. Above the door is a rectangular fanlight. The windows are sashes.	II
Old Warps; 53.3871°N 2.5766°W	—	Early 19th century	This was built as a mansion, and its grounds have subsequently been converted into Victoria Park. The mansion has since been used as a maternity home, then a private nursing home, then a restaurant. The building is stuccoed, with a parapet and a slate roof. It is in two storeys, and seven bays. The centre projects slightly and has a pediment and pilasters. The porch is also pedimented, and carried on Ionic columns.	II
Orford Green Farmhouse; 53.4058°N 2.5787°W	—	Early 19th century	The farmhouse is stuccoed with a slate roof, and is in two storeys. It has a studded door, above which is a fanlight. There are two five-light sliding sash windows in each floor.	II
Vigo House; 53.3903°N 2.5883°W	—	Early 19th century	A brick house in two storeys, with a slate roof, and a stone parapet and cornice. The entrance porch is flanked by detached Roman Doric columns, and has a cornice and a fanlight. The windows are sashes with the appearance of casements. The house is built on the site of an earlier house that was the home of the poet and essayist Anna Laetitia Barbauld.	II
98 and 100 Wilderspool Causeway; 53.3818°N 2.5910°W	—	Early 19th century (probable)	Originating as a warehouse on the bank of the River Mersey before it was diverted, it has since been converted into residential use. It is constructed in brick with a slate roof, in an L-plan. The building is in two and three storeys.	II
Barn, Orford Green Farm; 53.4058°N 2.5783°W	—	Early 19th century (probable)	The barn is constructed in brick with a slate roof. It has segmental-headed doorways, and ventilation holes arranged as lozenges.	II
St James' Church, Wilderspool; 53.3830°N 2.5911°W		1828–30	The church was designed by Samuel Rowland, and its interior was re-ordered in 1897, when the galleries and box pews were removed. It is in Gothic Revival style, with an embraced west tower, a short chancel and north and south vestries. A baptistry has been formed in the base of the tower.	II
Friends' Meeting House; 53.3893°N 2.5913°W	—	1829–30	A meeting house for Quakers replacing an earlier building. It is in a single-storey, constructed in brick with a stone plinth and eaves cornice, and a hipped slate roof. The entrance and a semicircular staircase projection are on the south side. The windows are sashes. Inside are separate meeting rooms for men and women with a passageway between.	II
Trustee Savings Bank; 53.3901°N 2.5889°W		1829–31	A bank with two storeys at the front, and three storeys at part of the back. It is in brick with stone facing at the front, stone dressings, and a slate roof. The ground floor is rusticated, and the upper floor contains Ionic pilasters, a frieze, a cornice and a parapet. The ground floor has windows without glazing bars under semicircular heads; the windows in the upper floor are sashes.	II
Three Pigeons Public House; 53.3934°N 2.5960°W		1831	This originated as the booking office for the Warrington and Newton Railway; the public house frontage was added later in the 19th century. It is constructed in brick and has two and three storeys. The ground floor is stuccoed. The doors are round-arched, and have pilasters and a cornice.	II
National School; 53.3899°N 2.5847°W	—	1833	A brick building in two storeys; the facade is retained as part of a residential building. At the corners are octagonal towers. In the centre is a two-storey canted bay window containing mullioned and transomed windows under a gable. Above the entrances are the carved words "boys" and "girls".	II
93 Bewsey Street; 53.3931°N 2.5976°W	—	Early to mid-19th century	A brick building in two storeys, the doorcase is flanked by fluted Doric columns, and has an arched fanlight. This in turn is flanked by bay windows. The other windows are sashes.	II
13 and 15 Suez Street; 53.3877°N 2.5956°W	—	1846	A pair of houses in brick with stone quoins. Three steps lead up to a large double-arched doorway with fluted Ionic columns and pilasters. On the Bold Street side is a bay window; the other windows are sashes.	II
District Bank; 53.3888°N 2.5948°W	—	1847	A bank in stone with two storeys, designed by Edward Walters. In the ground floor is a round-arched doorway, and windows separated by panelled Venetian pilasters. The upper storey is in five bays, and contains Corinthian columns and sash windows.	II
9–19 Bold Street; 53.3879°N 2.5956°W	—	19th century	A terrace of seven houses on the east side of Palmyra Square. They are constructed in brick with stone dressings and quoins. The porches are in pairs, and have inner doorways with pilasters and fanlights. The windows are sashes.	II
1 Froghall Lane; 53.3929°N 2.5981°W	—	19th century	A three-storey house, constructed in brick with a stone band over the first floor. Above the door is a round-headed fanlight. The windows are sashes.	II
74 and 76 Grenall's Avenue; 53.3737°N 2.5869°W	—	19th century	A pair of stuccoed semi-detached houses in two storeys. Both have doors with rectangular fanlights. Number 74 has two bay windows, above which is a sash window flanked by two casement windows. Number 76 has one bay window and a sash window on the ground floor, and two casement windows above.	II
Barclays Bank, Sankey Street; 53.3888°N 2.5950°W		19th century	The bank is constructed in brick, with stone dressings, including quoins. Its corner is canted. The building is in three storeys, and has an iron balcony on the first floor.	II
Barley Mow Public House (side façade); 53.3900°N 2.5945°W	—	19th century	This façade dates from a 19th-century refronting of the public house that originated in the 16th century. It is in brick, with two storeys and an attic. There is a round-arched entrance flanked by wooden pilasters, and a tympanum that incorporates the carving of a barley sheaf. The windows are sashes, and there are two small blocked windows in the attic.	II*
Greenall Whitley's Brewery (hop store); 53.3756°N 2.5835°W	—	19th century	The former hop store of a now-defunct brewery. It is built in red and blue brick with a stone cornice, and is in two storeys. In the upper storey are triangular oriel windows. At the north corner is a round tower with a clock face and round-arched windows.	II
Offices, Lilford Street; 53.3967°N 2.6024°W	—	19th century	This building originated as a villa in Neoclassical style, later converted into offices. It has a square plan, is in two storeys, is constructed in brick, and has hipped slate roof. Its entrance incorporates Ionic columns and pilasters, a plain frieze and a modillioned cornice. The windows are sashes.	II
Milestone; 53.41929°N 2.59803°W		Mid-19th century (or earlier)	Located on the east side of the A49 road, it consists of a whitewashed stone with a round front, a flat back, and a half-domed top. It is inscribed with the distances in miles to Warrington and Wigan.	II
21 Bold Street; 53.3875°N 2.5955°W	—	Mid-19th century	A two-storey building on the corner of Bold Street and Suez Street, constructed in brick with stone dressings. On the Bold Street front is an entrance approached up steps, with Ionic columns and pilasters, a frieze, a cornice, and a fanlight. The windows are sashes. On the Suez Street front are relief carvings of beasts.	II
Bewsey Terrace; 53.3964°N 2.6046°W	—	Mid-19th century	A terrace of four houses in brick with hipped roof slate roofs, and a stone band between he storeys. The doors are modern, and have rectangular fanlights. The windows are sashes.	II
Fish Market; 53.3897°N 2.5944°W		Mid-19th century	The fish market was built as an extension to the market hall, which was demolished in 1974. It consists of an open canopy supported by iron columns. The decorative features include ornamented spandrels, and capitals with foliage, lions' heads and fruit. Internally, six octagonal lanterns are suspended from the roof.	II
3 and 5 Bewsey Road; 53.3935°N 2.5987°W	—	Mid-19th century (probable)	The building has a square plan, and was probably originally a villa. It is constructed in brick, and has a stone band, and a hipped slate roof. It contains a round-arched doorway and sash windows.	II
95 Buttermarket Street; 53.3902°N 2.5894°W	—	Mid-19th century (probable)	A detached house in three storeys, it is constructed in stuccoed brick with a slate roof. The door is flanked with Tuscan columns, and above it is a cornice and a fanlight. The windows are sashes.	II
135 and 137 Church Street; 53.3912°N 2.5807°W		Mid-19th century (probable)	A pair of houses at the entrance to the churchyard. They are constructed in rusticated stone with slate roofs. The front is symmetrical with a gabled wing at each end. The windows have two lights, the upper ones being in half-dormers with gablets.	II
Warrington Museum & Art Gallery; 53.3870°N 2.5959°W		1855–57	One of the first local authority libraries and museums in the country, it was designed by Thomas Stone, who modified plans prepared by John Dobson. The art gallery was added in 1877, followed by another gallery in 1929–31. The building is constructed in brick and stone, and has two storeys.	II
10–16 Bewsey Road; 53.3934°N 2.5996°W	—	c. 1860	A symmetrical terrace of four two-storey houses, built in brick. There are four doors with round-headed fanlights and panelled pilasters. The windows are sashes, and there is a panel inscribed "Bewsey Place".	II
Entrance gates, piers and lamps, Town Hall; 53.38876°N 2.59949°W		1862	A set of ornate gates in cast iron, partly gilded, designed by Kershaw and Crook, and made at the Coalbrookdale Company at Ironbridge. They were shown at the International Exhibition in London in 1862, and erected here in 1895. Statues depicting Nike by John Bell stand on the four posts. Among the decorations are the Prince of Wales's feathers and his motto.	II*
Statue of Oliver Cromwell; 53.38613°N 2.59216°W		1862	The statue was made by John Bell, displayed at the 1862 London Exhibition, and presented to the town in 1899. It stands in front of Warrington Academy, and consists of a standing bronze figure on a square plinth. It is inscribed with "Cromwell" as a signature.	II
19–21 Sankey Street; 53.3889°N 2.5943°W		1864	One of the earliest works designed by John Douglas, it comprised the showrooms for Robert Garrett and Sons. It is in three storeys, and has a Gothic façade with lancet windows. It was later occupied by Woolworth's.	II
1–21 Palmyra Square; 53.3874°N 2.5965°W	—	Third quarter of the 19th century	A terrace of houses on the south side of Palmyra Square, later used as offices. They are constructed in brick and are in two storeys. Each house has a doorway with Tuscan pilasters, a frieze, a cornice and a plain fanlight. The windows in the lower storey are a mix of bay windows, sashes, and modern windows. In the upper storey they are all sashes.	II
St Ann's Church; 53.3967°N 2.5948°W		1866–68	Designed by John Douglas in High Victorian Gothic style. It is constructed in red brick with dressings in blue brick. The church has a tower and an apsidal chancel. It was closed in 1995 and converted into an indoor climbing centre in 1996.	II*
104–128 Greenall's Avenue; 53.3728°N 2.5886°W	—	1870	A row of terraced cottages in brick with two storeys. Each cottage has a round-headed fanlight above the door, and sash windows. Between each pair of cottages is a door leading through to the back yard.	II
80–100 Greenall's Avenue; 53.3732°N 2.5880°W	—	c. 1870	A row of brick cottages with a slate roof. They are in two storeys, and between each pair of cottages is a door leading through to the back yard. Most of the windows are sashes; numbers 80–84 have casements.	II
Baronet Farmhouse; 53.3724°N 2.6010°W	—	1872 (or earlier)	The farmhouse and outbuildings are constructed in handmade brick with slate roofs. The farmhouse has two storeys, and a door with a round-arched fanlight. This and the other buildings are arranged around a cobbled courtyard.	II
Cheshire Lines Warehouse; 53.3928°N 2.5905°W		1873	A warehouse for the Cheshire Lines Committee, now converted to residential use with a central atrium. It is a rectangular building in two storeys, with large openings on the ground floor, and five segmental-headed windows in the upper storey. Between the windows are pilasters, and there are larger pilasters on the corners. On top of the building, behind a parapet, is a hipped roof.	II
Monks Siding signal box 53.38467°N 2.61512°W		1875	The signal box was built for and by the London and North Western Railway. It is an example of their Type 3, the first type designed in-house by this railway. The signal box is constructed with a brick base, and an upper floor in timber, with a roof in Welsh slate and tiles. The original lever frame has been retained.	II
St Mary's Church; 53.3898°N 2.5889°W		1875–77	A Roman Catholic church designed by E. W. Pugin, and completed by Peter Paul Pugin, who also added the southwest tower in 1906. It is a stone church in Gothic Revival (Decorated) style. Features include twin west windows, numerous round windows, and a square chancel flanked by chapels. The tower has a parapet spelling "AVE MARIA".	II
12 Bold Street; 53.3874°N 2.5959°W	—	Late 19th century	The building is constructed in brick, it is in two storeys, and has a stone band between the storeys. The central doorway has Ionic columns and flanking pilasters, and above it are a frieze and a cornice. The windows are sashes.	II
2 and 4 Bridge Street; 53.3889°N 2.5936°W	—	Late 19th century	A stone building, in Neoclassical style, with three storeys and modern shop fonts in the ground floor. The middle storey contains four round-arched windows, flanked by Ionic pilasters. In the top storey the four windows are rectangular, mullioned and transomed, with Composite order pilasters. Along the top of the building is a cornice and a balustraded parapet.	II
8 Bridge Street; 53.38873°N 2.59352°W	—	Late 19th century	This is a tall and narrow stone building in three storeys and an attic. The ground floor has a modern shop front. In the first floor are two long, narrow windows with curved pediments and iron balconies. The top floor contains two rectangular windows, around which are festoons. The attic has a large sash window.	II
10 Bridge Street; 53.38868°N 2.59349°W	—	Late 19th century	This is a tall and narrow stone building in three storeys and an attic. The ground floor has a modern shop front. Above are Gothic windows, a Decorated frieze. Above the attic window is a curved pediment.	II
10 Egypt Street; 53.3880°N 2.5956°W	—	Late 19th century	A two-storey house in red brick with stone dressings, including quoins, a band and a cornice. The doorway is round-arched, and flanked by panelled pilasters. The windows are sashes.	II
6 and 8 Froghall Lane; 53.3928°N 2.5994°W	—	Late 19th century	A pair of semi-detached houses, number 6 being larger than number 8. They are constructed in brick with stone dressings, and have two storeys. Both have battlemented porches. Number 6 has two gables with bargeboards and pinnacles; number 8 has one.	II
Army and Navy Stores, Golden Egg, and Wimpy Snack Bar; 53.3883°N 2.5933°W	—	Late 19th century	Located in Bridge Street, the building is constructed in terracotta. It is in three storeys, with modern shop fronts in the ground floor. The middle storey contains three large windows with semicircular windows and panelled pilasters. In the top storey are six pairs of elliptical-headed windows. On the top are three gables, each containing a circular window. and a balustraded parapet.	II
16, 18 and 20 Bridge Street; 53.3885°N 2.5935°W	—	Late 19th century	Located in Bridge Street, this is a stone building with three storeys and attics. The building is symmetrical, with three round-arched windows in each upper storey flanked by recessed windows, and Composite pilasters. The second floor has a curved balcony, and there is a cornice with egg-and-dart moulding. There are three gabled attics with swags.	II
Cross Keys Public House; 53.3898°N 2.5898°W	—	Late 19th century	A public house in brick with stone dressings, and in two storeys. It contains Gothic features, including sharply pointed arches, and ornate decoration. At the top of the building are an ornamented brick cornice, two half-dormers, and gables with iron pinnacles.	II
Holly Lodge; 53.3928°N 2.5996°W	—	Late 19th century	A red brick house in Gothic style. Its features include a gable with carved bargeboards, pinnacles, and an arrow slit. There is a bay window in the ground floor with a sash window above.	II
Post Office; 53.3885°N 2.5993°W		Late 19th century	The Post Office has a stone ground floor and a brick upper storey. In the ground floor are sash windows and pilasters. The upper floor has three Venetian windows flanked by single windows. Between the floors, and above the upper floor, are stone cornices.	II
St Albans Youth Centre; 53.3956°N 2.6038°W	—	Late 19th century	This originated as a villa in Bewsey Road. It is in Gothic style, constructed in brick, with a hipped slate roof. The building is in two storeys, with a stone band, and has a symmetrical front. Features include a Tudor-arched doorway, sash windows, and cast iron balconies.	II
Saracen's Head Public House; 53.3761°N 2.5833°W	—	1880s	A public house built near the Greenall Whitley Brewery to be its showpiece. It is constructed in dark brick with dressings in red brick. The windows are sashes with stone mullions, and bay windows. The interior includes mosaic flooring.	II
St Luke's Church; 53.3854°N 2.6151°W		1892–93	A sandstone church with tiled roofs designed by Bodley and Garner, it was closed in the 1980s and is currently unused. It consists of a nave, north aisle, chancel and south porch. There is a bellcote on the east end of the nave. The church is unusual in that it has a central nave arcade and another arcade between the nave and the aisle.	II*
Sacred Heart Church; 53.3890°N 2.6071°W		1894–95	A Roman Catholic church designed by Sinnott, Sinnott and Powell. It is constructed in red brick, and has a west tower, originally with a saddleback roof. The windows along the sides are lancets; the west window is in Decorated style. It has a short chancel, and there is a south chapel with a hipped roof.	II
Parr Hall; 53.3872°N 2.5976°W	—	1895	A public hall designed by William Owen for J, Charlton Parr. It is constructed in brick with terracotta and ashlar dressings, and has a slate roof. Inside the hall is a balcony and a stage. In 1923–26 a Cavaillé-Coll pipe organ was installed in the hall.	II
Albion Public House; 53.3958°N 2.5850°W		1896	A public house designed by William and Segar Owen for the Greenall Whitley Brewery in free Renaissance style. It is constructed in brick with terracotta and sandstone dressings and has a slate roof. There are three storeys and attics, and it has a courtyard plan with outbuildings. The two main fronts have shaped gables.	II
Police Station and Courts; 53.3861°N 2.6007°W		1889–1900	The police station and courts were designed by R. Burns Dick. They are constructed in brick and sandstone, with terracotta decoration. The building is in two storeys. Its features include two octagonal turrets surmounted by domed metal pavilions, oriel windows, dormers, a porch and other entrances in Tuscan style, large semicircular pediments, and a cornice with egg-and-dart decoration.	II
County Court; 53.3872°N 2.5990°W		1897	The court was designed by Henry Turner. It is a red brick building with terracotta dressings in two tall storeys. Its features include tall gables, octagonal turrets, an oriel window, and other windows with mullions and transoms.	II
Drinking fountain, Palmyra Square; 53.38774°N 2.59685°W		1897	A small iron drinking fountain, incorporating fluted columns, open round arches, decorated spandrels, a domed roof, a relief medallion depicting Queen Victoria, and the inscription "Keep the pavement dry".	II
3–13 Springfield Street; 53.3876°N 2.5984°W	—	c. 1900	A terrace of houses on the west side of Palmyra Square, constructed in brick. Numbers 7–13 have three storeys, each with a gabled dormer under a pediment; the other houses have two storeys. Each house has a bay window, and above each doorway is a fanlight.	II
Barclays Bank, Bridge Street; 53.3878°N 2.5931°W	—	c. 1900	Located on the corner of Bridge Street and Rylands Street, this is a half-timbered building in picturesque style. It is in three storeys, with three gables on the front facing Bridge Street. The entrance is on the canted corner, and is flanked by barley-sugar columns. Features include Gothic window tracery, carved bargeboards, and small-paned mullioned windows.	II
Feathers Public House; 53.3875°N 2.5928°W		c. 1900	This is located in Bridge Street, and is constructed in red brick with stone dressings. It is in three storeys with dormers. In the ground floor are round- or segmental-headed windows with large keystones. Above them are two two-storey oriel windows, each containing three sashes. At the top of the building is a cornice.	II
Royal Oak Public House and 109–113 Bridge Street; 53.3869°N 2.5919°W		c. 1900	A public house and three adjoining houses in stone with terracotta dressings and slate roofs, designed by William and Segar Owen. They are in two storeys, with three shop fronts on the ground floor under segmental arches. On the first floor are three mullioned and transomed oriel windows and iron balconies. Along the top of the building are five gables, and a parapet.	II
Wheatsheaf Public House; 53.3955°N 2.5921°W	—	c. 1900	A public house designed by William and Segar Owen for the Greenall Whitley Brewery. It is constructed in brick with terracotta dressings, it has tall decorated chimneys, and a hipped roof with Westmorland slates. There is a variety of windows, including sashes, Venetian windows, and dormers.	II
Technical School; 53.3873°N 2.5982°W		1900–02	The school was designed by William and Segar Owen. Now occupied by restaurants, the building is constructed in red brick with terracotta dressings, and has a large stone central portion containing the entrance. The entrance is approached by steps, is flanked by pairs of columns, and above it is a large curved pediment and an iron balcony. The school is in two high storeys with a sub-basement. There are five windows on each side of the entrance in each storey. Between the storeys are terracotta relief panels containing the names of historical scientists. Inside is a mosaic floor.	II
Church of Our Lady of the Assumption; 53.3834°N 2.5839°W	—	1901–02	A Roman Catholic church designed by local architect Robert Curran, with internal fittings by John Douglas. It is constructed in sandstone with slate roofs, and is in Gothic Revival style. The plan consists of a nave with a clerestory, north and south aisles with chapels, a chancel and apsidal sanctuary, and southwest tower incorporating a porch.	II
12 and 14 Bridge Street; 53.3886°N 2.5935°W	—	1905	A stone building in three storeys and an attic. On the ground floor is modern shop front. The middle storey contains three elliptical-headed windows with panelled pilasters and a cornice. The top floor has four windows, also elliptical-headed, and Ionic columns. Above this is an egg-and-dart cornice. At the top of the building is a central gable containing an oval window.	II
Boer War Memorial; 53.38777°N 2.59655°W		1906	Situated in Queens Gardens is a memorial to members of the South Lancashire Regiment who were killed during the Boer War. It was sculpted by Alfred Drury, and consists of a bronze statue of Lt-Col O'Leary standing on a rock podium with a brass plaque containing the soldiers' names.	II
Howard Buildings; 53.3883°N 2.5929°W	—	c. 1906	A building in sandstone with terracotta decoration. Only the facade remains, as part of Warrington Market. It has three storeys, the ground floor, containing modern shop fronts. The middle storey has seven segmental-arched windows. Above this is a frieze of carved panels, then two windows to each bay, another frieze, this with a shall pattern, and an egg-and-dart cornice. On the roof are two dormers. The building takes its name from the prison reformer John Howard who lodged in an earlier building on the site in 1777.	II
76–82 Sankey Street; 53.3889°N 2.5975°W	—	1907	A block of three gabled shops designed by Wright, Garnett and Wright in the style of Norman Shaw. They are constructed in red brick, and have two storeys plus an attic. In the upper storey are oriel windows.	II
General Post Office; 53.3881°N 2.5982°W		1908	Designed by W. Potts, this is a building in red brick with stone dressings. It has 3 1/2 storeys, and a symmetrical front with towers at the corners. The top floor contains dormers and a balustrade, above which is a mansard roof. The lettering on the building is in Art Nouveau style.	II
Orford Hotel; 53.4018°N 2.5788°W		c. 1908	A hotel, later a public house, designed by Wright and Hamlyn for the Greenall Whitley Brewery. It is built in terracotta and brick, with Westmorland slate roofs. It stands on a corner site, and has a courtyard plan. Its main front is in two storeys with two slightly projecting bays, one square, the other canted; both bays have gables surmounted by pinnacles with ball finials.	II
Warrington Transporter Bridge; 53.38383°N 2.60757°W		1911–14	The transporter bridge was built to carry materials across the River Mersey between two parts of the Crosfield's factory. It is a steel structure with a span of 200 feet (61 m) between the towers. The bridge was designed by William Henry Hunter and built by William Arrol. The structure is also a scheduled monument.	II*
Howley Footbridge; 53.38730°N 2.57869°W		1912	A footbridge over the River Mersey connecting the area around St Elphin's Church with Victoria Park. It is a suspension bridge, constructed in iron.	II
Bank, 11–13 Bridge Street; 53.3889°N 2.5932°W	—	Early 20th century	Built for the Midland Bank later the HSBC. this is a stone building in three storeys. In the ground floor is a round-arched entrance, the middle storey has three windows and a balcony, and above the top floor is a pediment.	II
Warrington Cenotaph; 53.38575°N 2.59044°W		1925	The cenotaph is in stone and consists of a tall obelisk on a cruciform-shaped plinth on a one-stepped base. On the front of the obelisk is an inverted bronze sword of sacrifice under a decorative band, and at the base is a moulded foot and a Greek key band. On the plinth is a band with acanthus decoration, and an inscribed panel. Behind the cenotaph is a curved stone wall containing bronze plaques with inscriptions and the names of those lost in the two World Wars and in later conflicts, including civilians.	II
Telephone kiosk, Bridge Foot; 53.38606°N 2.59132°W		1930	A K4 type telephone kiosk in cast iron. The top panels contain three crowns, perforated to allow ventilation. There is an integrated stamp selling machine and posting box.	II
Telephone kiosks, Sankey Street; 53.38870°N 2.59876°W	—	1935	A pair of K6 type telephone kiosks, designed by Giles Gilbert Scott. Constructed in cast iron and domed, they have three unperforated crowns in the top panels.	II
Telephone kiosks, Market Gate; 53.38897°N 2.59373°W	—	1935	Three K6 type telephone kiosks, designed by Giles Gilbert Scott. Constructed in cast iron and domed, they have three unperforated crowns in the top panels.	II
383 Wilderspool Causeway; 53.3759°N 2.5832°W	—	Undated	A cottage-style lodge opposite Greenall's Brewery. It is constructed in brick with stone dressings, and has a roughcast upper storey. There is a bay window with brick mullions; the other windows are casements.	II
Cobbles leading to St Elphin's Church; 53.39111°N 2.5808°W	—	Undated	The path from Church Street to the gateway of the church is cobbled, and is flanked by a pavement of flagstones.	II
St Paul's Churchyard wall 53.39345°N 2.59995°W	—	Undated	A red sandstone wall surrounding all four sides of the churchyard of St Paul's Church (church demolished in 1980s).	II

== See also ==
- Grade I and II* listed buildings in Warrington, covering the unitary authority
