= Holy Trinity Church, Warrington =

Coordinates: 53.3894°N 2.5917°W

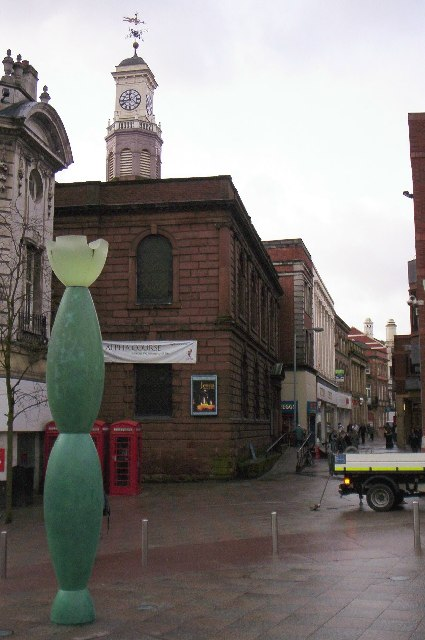
- Holy Trinity Church, Warrington

- Location in Cheshire
- OS grid reference: SJ 606,882
- Location: Warrington, Cheshire
- Country: England
- Denomination: Anglican
- Churchmanship: Evangelical
- Website: Holy Trinity, Warrington

History
- Status: Parish church
- Dedication: Trinity
- Consecrated: 1760

Architecture
- Functional status: Active
- Heritage designation: Grade II*
- Designated: 6 December 1949
- Architectural type: Church
- Style: Georgian
- Groundbreaking: 1758

Specifications
- Materials: Sandstone front and tower Brick with stone dressings at rear

Administration
- Province: York
- Diocese: Liverpool
- Archdeaconry: Warrington
- Deanery: Warrington
- Parish: Holy Trinity, Warrington

Clergy
- Vicar: Rev Shirley Cowan

Holy Trinity Church is in the centre of the town of Warrington, Cheshire, England. The church is recorded in the National Heritage List for England as a designated Grade II* listed building. It is an active Anglican parish church in the diocese of Liverpool, the archdeaconry of Warrington and the deanery of Warrington.

== History ==
A chapel of ease known as Trinity Chapel was built on the site in 1708 to relieve pressure on the parish church of St Elphin's. It was built as an oratory by Peter Legh of Lyme Park. By the 1750s the chapel was too small for its congregation and in 1758 subscriptions were raised to build a new church, which was consecrated in 1760. The architecture is in the style of James Gibbs, but he was ill at the time the church was built and it is thought it was designed by one of Gibbs' associates. In 1862 a west clock tower was added which was designed by W. P. Coxon, the Borough Surveyor; the tower belongs to the town rather than to the church. In 1974 the south aisle was re-designed to form the Garven Room, a servery, a vestry and toilets. By the 1970s the roof had been damaged by wet and dry rot, woodworm and death watch beetle and was replaced in 1978–79. By 1990 the pipe organ was beyond repair and it has been replaced by a Makin electronic organ. In 1988 the west end was remodelled, forming a lobby. In 1997 the east end was reordered, adding a room and extending the sanctuary area. In 1999 the clock was refurbished by Warrington Borough Council as a Millennium project.

== Architecture ==
=== Exterior ===
The church is built in Georgian style. Its front is constructed in sandstone, and the rear in brick with stone dressings. The stonework at the front is rusticated. The front aspect is in four stages; at the base is a rusticated plinth, above which is a tier of windows with a Doric doorcase at the west of the front. Then comes an upper tier of windows with Ionic pilasters and at the top a cornice and a plain parapet. In the east wall is a Palladian window. The tower is in cast iron and has octagonal and square stages with a slim ogee-cap.

=== Interior ===
Internally there are galleries on three sides. The reredos is a First World War memorial by E. Carter Preston dated 1920, the communion table is in Rococo style and is a survival from the first chapel. The font is a baluster dating from the 18th century with an Arts and Crafts cover. The pulpit (altered) dates from the 18th century and most of the box pews survive, albeit most with doors removed. On the west balcony wall is a painting of the Holy Family, which is a copy dated from around 1776 by James Cranke of an original (in the Louvre) by Andrea del Sarto. The brass chandelier formerly hung in St Stephen's Chapel in the House of Commons. It was rescued after a fire and presented to the church in 1801.

== See also ==
- Grade I and II* listed buildings in Warrington
- Listed buildings in Warrington (unparished area)
