= St Gregory's Church, Cheltenham =

St Gregory's Church
- Church of St Gregory the Great
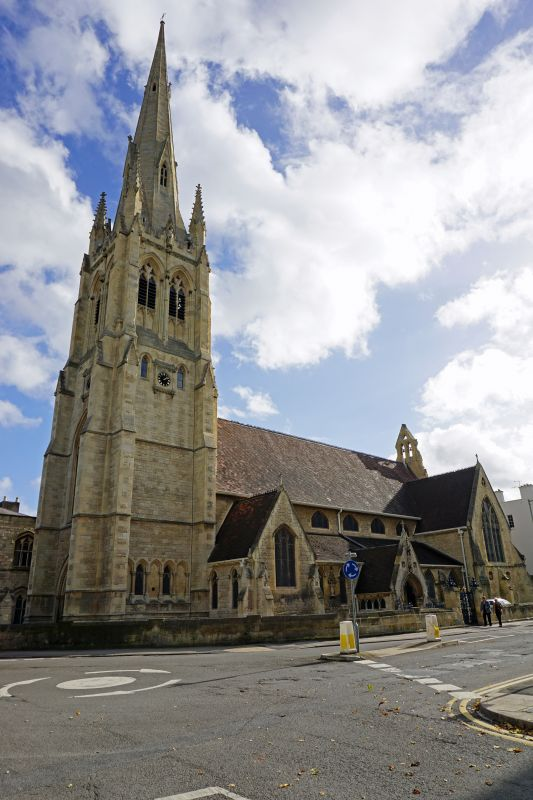

- Location within Gloucestershire Location within England
- 51.9015°N 2.0803°W
- OS grid reference: SO 94570 22558
- Location: Cheltenham
- Country: England
- Denomination: Roman Catholic
- Website: StGregorys.org.uk

History
- Status: Parish Church
- Founded: 1809
- Dedication: Pope Gregory I
- Consecrated: 6 November 1877

Architecture
- Functional status: Active
- Heritage designation: Grade II* listed
- Architect: Charles Hansom
- Style: Gothic Revival
- Years built: 1854 to May 1857
- Completed: 1876

Administration
- Province: Birmingham
- Diocese: Clifton
- Deanery: St Kenelm
- Parish: St Gregory the Great with St Thomas More

Listed Building – Grade II*
- Official name: Church of St Gregory
- Designated: 4 May 1972
- Reference no.: 1387870

St Gregory the Great Church is a Roman Catholic Parish church in Cheltenham, Gloucestershire, England. It was founded in 1809 and rebuilt from 1854 to 1857. It is situated on the corner of St James' Square and Clarence Street. It was designed by Charles Hansom and is a Grade II* listed building.

== History ==
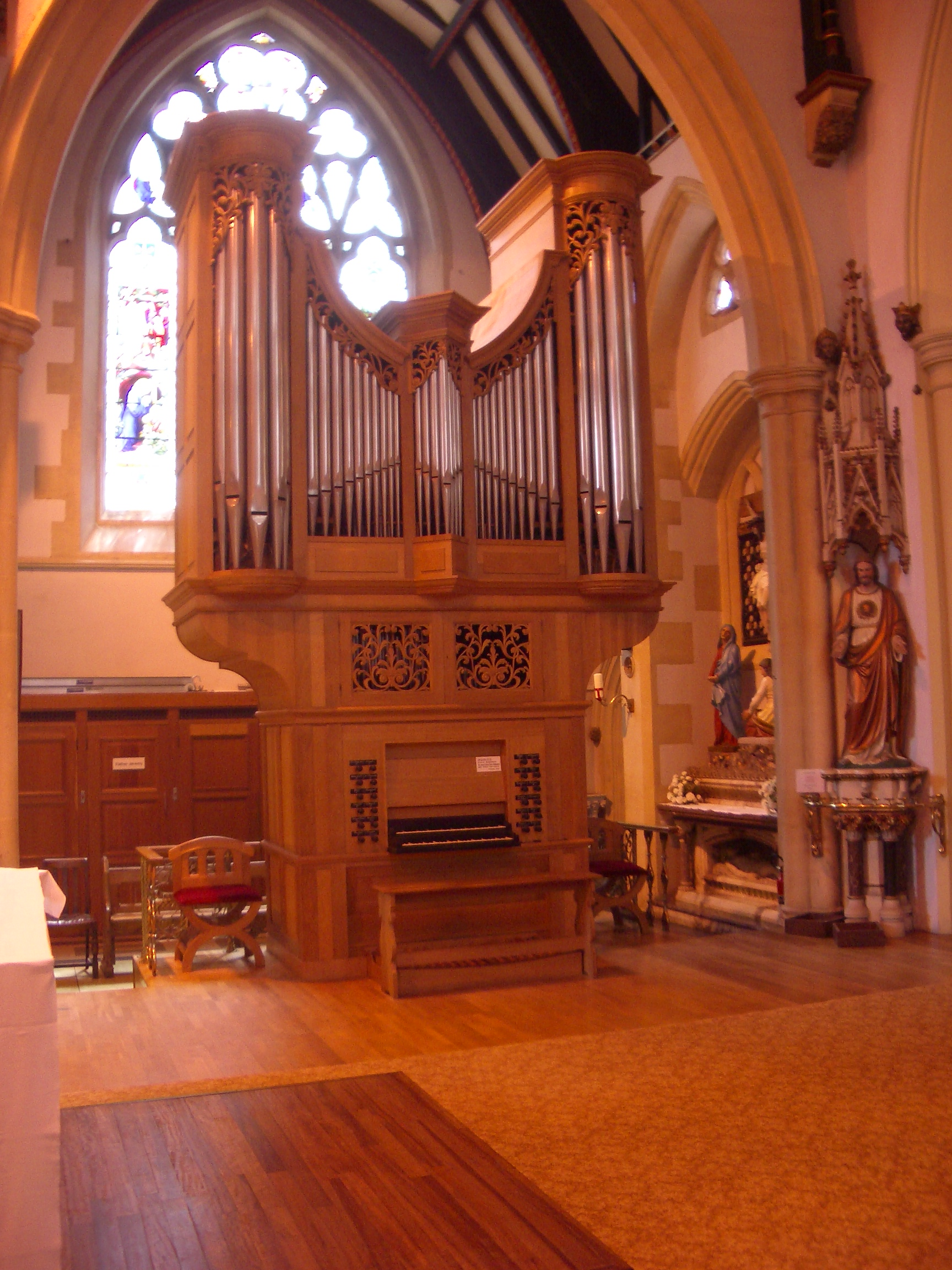
Church organ

=== Foundation ===
In 1809, a chapel was built on the site of the present church. It was built with the guidance of its first priest, Fr Augustine Birdsall OSB from Douai Abbey.

=== Construction ===
In the spring of 1854, the monks from Douai Abbey were still serving the church when building work started on the church. The church was designed by Charles Hansom, brother of Joseph Hansom and father of Edward Joseph Hansom. He also designed Plymouth Cathedral and St Osburg's Church in Coventry. He designed it to be a Gothic Revival church.

In May 1857, the chancel was completed and the church was opened. That year, work on the tower and spire had started, but was of course not complete. In 1876, the tower and spire were completed. The next year, on 6 November 1877, the church was consecrated.

The stained glass windows were designed by Hardman & Co. Inside the church, the altar and reredos were made by Farmer & Brindley. The majority of the carving was done by Messrs R. L. Boulton & Sons of Cheltenham; a firm which also worked on Cheltenham Town Hall, St John's Church in Poulton-le-Fylde, St Mary's Church and St Alban's Church in Warrington and St Cuthbert's in Earls Court.

== Parish ==
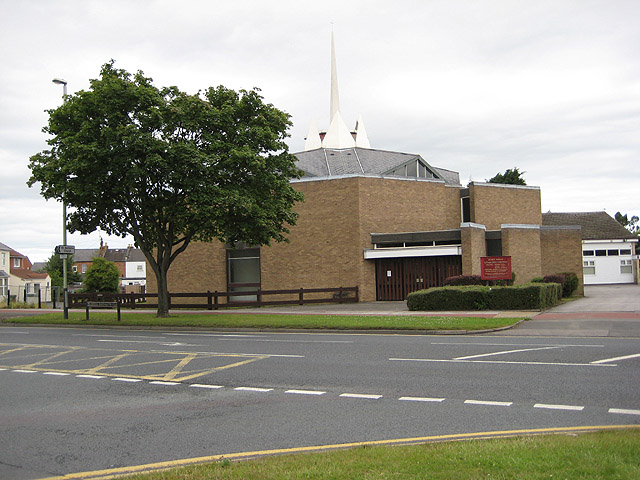
St Thomas More Church, before its demolition in 2011; the Catholic Centre is behind and to the right of the church.

The church is in the parish of St Gregory the Great with St Thomas More. It serves the St Thomas More Catholic Centre on Princess Elizabeth Way in Cheltenham. On 30 November 2011, St Thomas More Church was demolished and the church hall was developed to accommodate a sacristy, a chapel and use by community groups.

The church has three Sunday Masses: 9:30 am, 11:15 am and 5:00 pm. St Thomas More Catholic Centre has one Sunday Mass at 5:00 pm on Saturday.

== Organ ==
The church has two organs. The chancel organ was built by the Dutch organ builder Sebastian Blank and installed in 1986. The organ in the liturgical west gallery was installed in 2023; it was originally built by 'Father' Willis in 1866 for a church in Horsham, and subsequently moved to the chapel of the former Southwark diocesan seminary at Wonersh. Following the closure of the seminary, the organ was donated to St Gregory's. The principal organist is August Guan.

== See also ==
- Cheltenham Deanery
- Roman Catholic Diocese of Clifton
