= Battle of Warrington Bridge =

Battle of Warrington Bridge may refer to:

- Battle of Warrington Bridge (1648), part of the Battle of Preston (1648)
- Battle of Warrington Bridge (1651), the only successful Royalist engagement of the Worcester Campaign
