= Colin Parry =

Colin Parry is the name of:

- Colin Parry (footballer) (born 1941), English footballer
- Colin Parry (actor) (born 1977), British actor
- Colin Parry, founder of the Tim Parry Johnathan Ball Foundation for Peace
