= Catherine Lucy Kennedy =

English headmistress (1851–1910)

Catherine Lucy Kennedy (1851 – 1910) was the first headmistress of Leeds Girls’ High School and headmistress of St Elphin's School.

== Early life ==
She was born on 20 September 1851 to Revd William James Kennedy, a school inspector, and his cousin Sarah Caroline Kennedy. She had three brothers, including William Rann Kennedy, and was educated at Cheltenham Ladies’ College.

== Teaching career ==
In 1874, Kennedy became assistant mistress of Cheltenham Ladies’ College under Dorothea Beale, until she was appointed first headmistress at the newly founded Leeds Girls’ High School in 1876, opened by subscription to provide education for the town's girls who could not attend the boy's grammar school. At an inaugural meeting in September 1876 she established that the main subjects to be taught were classical languages, mathematics, and natural science. During her fifteen-year tenure, the school had grown in size from 42 to 160 pupils.

In 1881, she carried out a scientific analysis of the Boston Spa water with Margaret Neill Johnston.

In 1896, she began a fourteen-year tenure as headmistress of the Clergy Daughter's School at Warrington. Under her headship, the school expanded to taking students who were not daughters of clergy and was renamed St Elphin's School, relocating to larger premises in Darley Dale in 1904.

Kennedy died at St Elphin's School on 17 February 1910.
