= Bridge Street, Warrington =

Road in Warrington, Cheshire, England

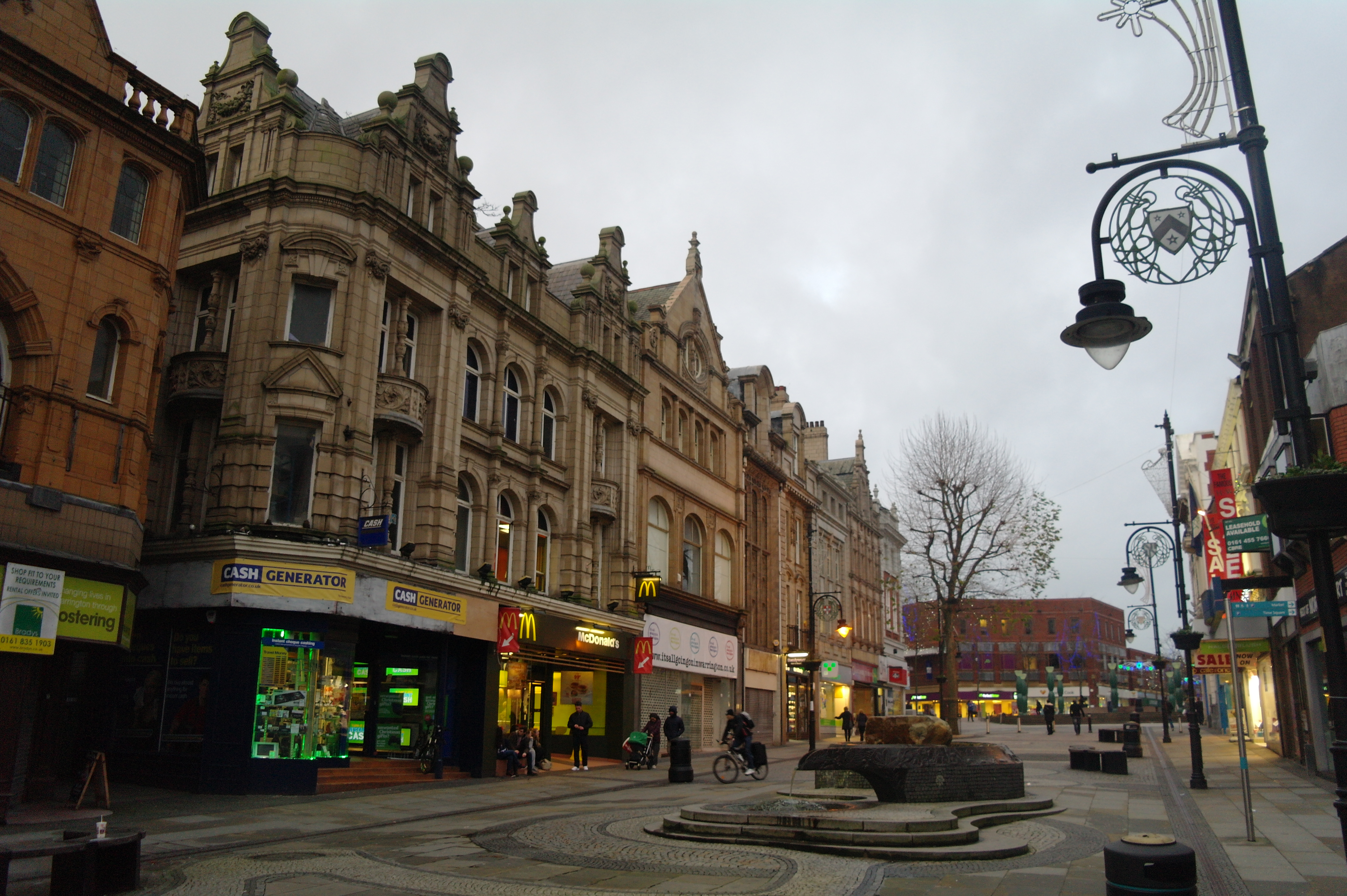
West frontage, upper Bridge Street

Bridge Street is one of the main thoroughfares of Warrington, Cheshire, England, linking the town centre to Warrington Bridge across the River Mersey.

The location earned nationwide recognition in the aftermath of the Warrington bombings of 1993, where two people were killed and another 56 people were injured.

== History ==
In the 18th century, John Howard lodged at a silversmiths on Bridge Street whilst printing his works on prison reform, as commemorated in a plaque erected by the Warrington Society in 1906. One of the buildings to house the Warrington Academy was located at the street's southern end.

The street was widened in the late 19th and early 20th centuries and formed part of the Warrington Corporation Tramways network. It was the site of a fatal IRA bomb attack in 1993. A public art installation, the River of Life, has been located in Bridge Street since 1996 as a memorial to those killed and injured.

== Architecture ==
The faience-clad elevations of on the western frontage of upper Bridge Street are a particularly noteworthy examples of late Victorian and Edwardian architectural elegance. Above street level these remain largely unaltered. A rebuilt version of the Warrington Academy currently houses the offices of the Warrington Guardian.

== Conservation area ==
A conservation area based on Bridge Street was designated in 1980. This was extended in 1995 to include the former Garnett Cabinet Works on the adjacent Barbauld Street.
