= St Elphin's School =

Former boarding school for daughters of the clergy

Coordinates: 53.1555°N 1.5807°W

St Elphins School was a boarding school for the daughters of the clergy of the Church of England. It was originally based in Warrington, Lancashire, England. It moved to Darley Dale, a rural area near Matlock, Derbyshire, in 1904, as the Warrington area had changed from open countryside and become highly industrialised. The school was founded in 1844 but had roots back to 1697. The school abruptly closed in March 2005 following financial problems.

== History ==
The school opened on 15 March 1844 in Warrington, dedicated to Saint Elphin who according to tradition founded Warrington's parish church. In 1857 the objectives of the school were: to provide a good education on advantageous terms: (i) to orphan daughters of clergy from the Archdeaconries of Manchester, Liverpool and Chester; (ii) to the daughters of clergy still working in these Archdeaconries; (iii) to the daughters of clergy from any diocese.

The original site in Warrington was in the country. However, by the turn of the 20th century, the area had become industrialised, and the move to the countryside in Darley Dale was made. The building occupied had previously been the Darly Dale Hydro, a hydrotherapy health spa.

Under the headship of Catherine Lucy Kennedy in 1896–1910, various additional facilities were made to the school and the criteria for pupils were extended to daughters of lay members of the Church of England.

In 2003, the school fell into financial difficulties and went into administration with debts of £3 million. A proposal was put forward to develop part of the site for housing and thus raise income to save the school. This was rejected by the local council, and the school closed in 2005. In December 2010 a website was published about the school and is regularly updated with photographs, information, magazines and news items.

Following the closure of the school, the site was acquired in 2006 and developed into a luxury retirement village, the main building being converted into retirement flats.

== Alumni ==
- Ruth Adam (1907–1977) Feminist writer
- Richmal Crompton (1890–1969), English writer of Just William
- Florence Mahoney (1929-) the first Gambian woman to obtain a PhD
- Mabel Joyce Maw - member of Ferguson's Gang
- Lesley Nicol (1953-) - actress (famous for playing Mrs Patmore in Downton Abbey)

== See also ==
- St Elphin's Church, Warrington
