= Warrington Town Hall =

Municipal building in Warrington, Cheshire, England

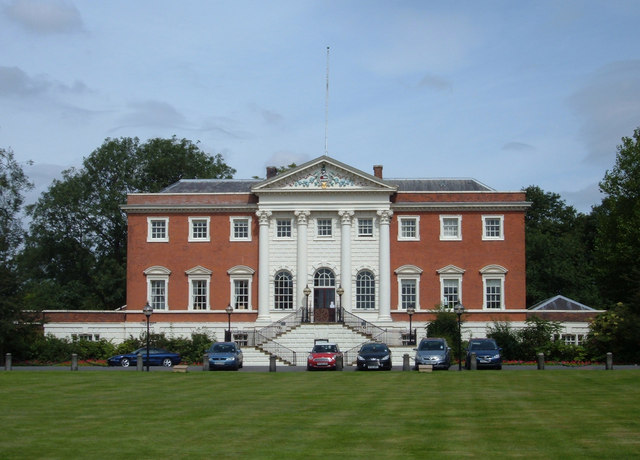
- Warrington Town Hall

- Location in Cheshire
- 53.3897°N 2.5997°W
- Location: Warrington, Cheshire, England
- OS grid reference: SJ 602,882

History
- Built: 1750
- Built for: Thomas Patten

Site notes
- Architect: James Gibbs
- Architectural style: Palladian

Listed Building – Grade I
- Designated: 6 December 1949
- Reference no.: 1329725

Warrington Town Hall is in the town of Warrington, Cheshire, England. It consists of a house, originally called Bank Hall, flanked by two detached service wings at right angles to the house, one on each side. The house and the service wings are each recorded in the National Heritage List for England as designated Grade I listed buildings. Being in that part of the town north of the River Mersey, the house falls within the historic county of Lancashire. The architectural historian Nikolaus Pevsner declared it to be "the finest house of its date in south Lancashire".

== History ==
Bank Hall was built in 1750 for Thomas Patten. The architect was James Gibbs and it is likely that it was the last important building of his design to be completed in his lifetime. When it was built it stood in open countryside to the north of the town of Warrington. The Patten family were important merchants in the town. Thomas' father had made the lower River Mersey navigable from Runcorn to Bank Quay, Warrington, and had established a copper smelting factory at Bank Quay. In 1870 John Wilson-Patten, 1st Baron Winmarleigh, sold the hall to Warrington Borough Council for £9000 (equivalent to £930,000 in 2025), and 13 acres (5.3 ha) of surrounding land for a further £15,000 (equivalent to £1,540,000 in 2025). Almost all of the land was opened as Warrington's first public park in 1873. A main road, bearing the name Wilson Patten Street, runs parallel to the road which the town hall stands on. When the house was built, it was surrounded by a high wall. In 1895 this was replaced by iron railings and a fine set of gates.

== Architecture ==
=== Exterior ===
The hall is built in Palladian style and has three storeys and a hipped slate roof. The front (south) façade has nine bays. The ground floor is in rusticated ashlar, as are the central three bays while the outer three bays on each side are in brick. The central area consists of a portico with four large ¾-attached Composite columns with a pediment bearing the arms of the Patten family. An open two-arm staircase, with a wrought iron balustrade, leads to the main entrance on the first floor. The north side of the hall is entirely of brick and is simpler. The whole house is built on a foundation made of blocks of copper slag from the Patten's smelting works. The detached service wings each have 13 bays and are similar to each other. Their middle three bays have three storeys and are in rusticated ashlar while the lateral bays have two storeys and are in brick.

=== Interior ===
The entrance hall is spacious and contains coats of arms of the Patten family, a stone chimney piece and a mosaic floor. The floor replaced a wooden one in 1902 and was laid by Italian workmen. It includes the initials J. W. P. for John Wilson Patten, L. W. for Lionel Whittle, was the town clerk at the time, T. L. for Thomas Longdin, the borough engineer, and Q. V. for Queen Victoria. The former great hall and the music room have been combined to form the council chamber. The former ladies retiring room and the dining room are now committee rooms and the reading room is used as the mayor's parlour. There are two similar staircases with wrought iron handrails. The window frames, which appear to be made of wood, are made from a combination of copper and iron, painted white.

== Park gates ==
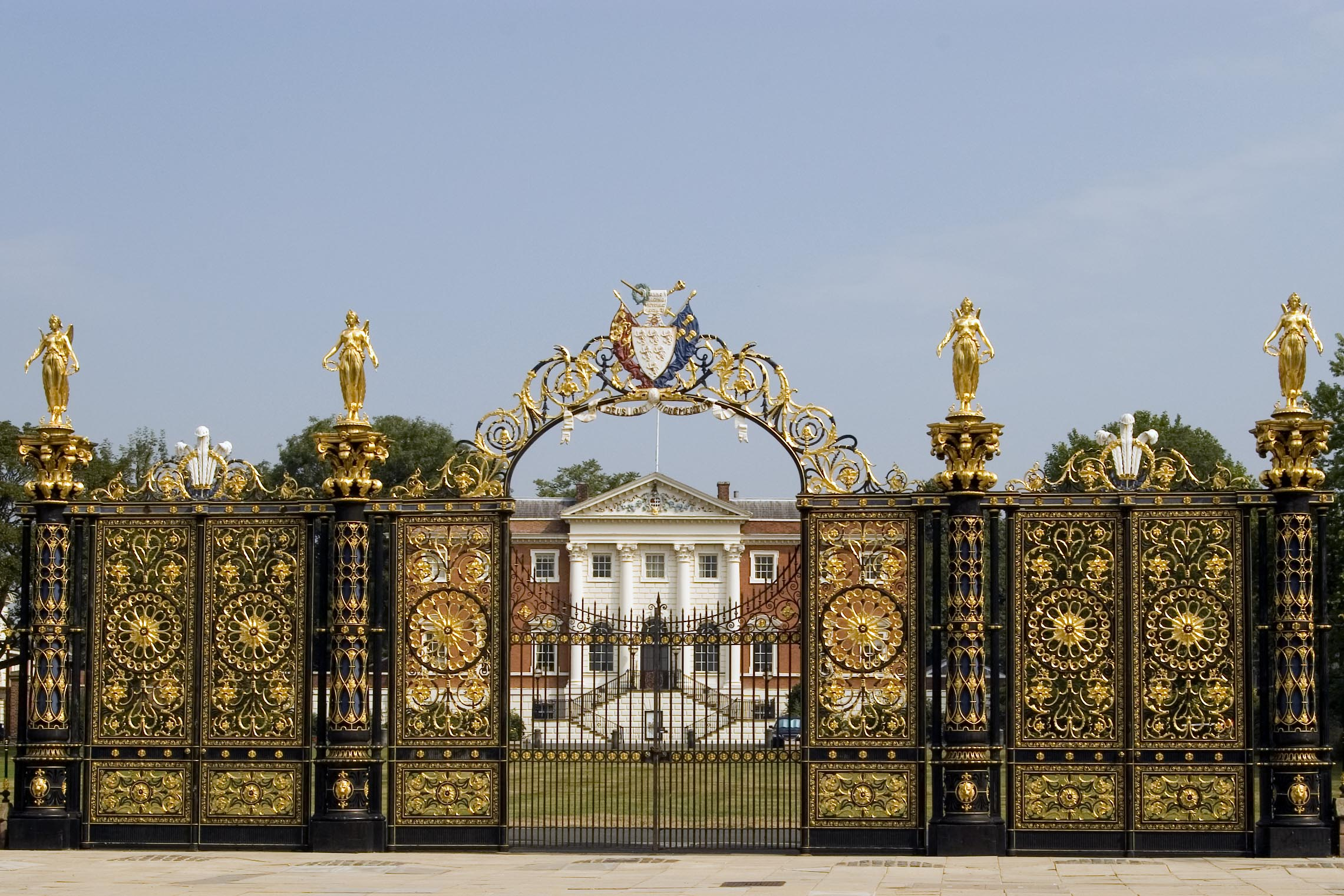
Park gates

The gates were made in cast iron by the Coalbrookdale Company at Ironbridge and had been shown at the International Exhibition in London in 1862. It is believed that they were originally commissioned as a gift to Queen Victoria, but she declined them. They were seen at Ironbridge in 1893 by Frederick Monks, a member of the council, and he offered them as a gift to Warrington Borough Council. They were formally opened on 28 June 1895. On each side of the gates is an ornate screen which contains four columns. On top of each column is a statue of Nike, the goddess of victory. In the centre of the archway over the gate are the arms of Warrington Borough Council. The gates, piers and associated lamps are listed at Grade II*. The park was initially surrounded by iron railings, but these were removed in 1942 to provide iron for use in the war effort.

== Other features ==
The lamps on the east and west drives of the town hall are also listed at Grade II*.

== See also ==
- Grade I and II* listed buildings in Warrington
- Listed buildings in Warrington (unparished area)
