= Warrington Bridge =

Coordinates: 53.3858°N 2.5913°W

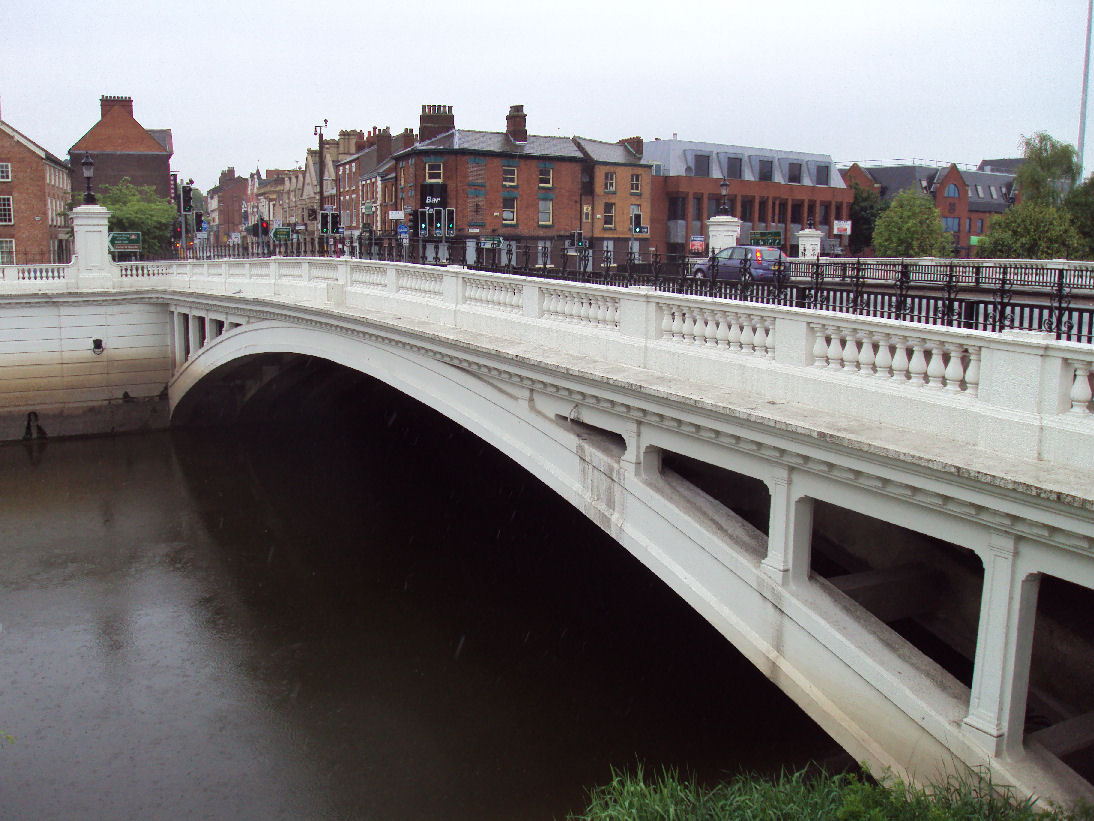
Warrington Bridge

Warrington Bridge is the name given to several historical bridges crossing the River Mersey in the town of Warrington, England. The current structure is the sixth to stand in this location and was constructed 1909–15 by Alfred Thorne & Sons. For centuries Warrington Bridge provided the lowest crossing of the Mersey and thus was of strategic and commercial importance. It is located to the south of the present town centre and linked to it via Bridge Street.

== History ==
The first recorded reference to Warrington Bridge is in 1285. It was the site of two battles during the English Civil War in 1648 and 1651. The bridge features in Walter Scott's novel Peveril of the Peak (ch 20) set in 1670s where it is described as having been built by Lord Derby.

=== Warrington New Bridge ===
A second road bridge was opened to the east in the 1986, in an attempt to alleviate traffic congestion.

== See also ==
- Warrington Transporter Bridge
