= Cheltenham Deanery =

The Cheltenham Deanery is a Roman Catholic deanery in the Diocese of Clifton that covers several churches in Cheltenham and the surrounding area. It is one of thirteen deaneries in the diocese. The other deaneries are Bath, Bristol East, Bristol North West, Bristol South, Glastonbury, Gloucester, Salisbury, Stroud, Swindon, Taunton, Trowbridge and Weston-super-Mare.

The dean of Cheltenham is centred at the Parish of St Gregory the Great and St Thomas More in Cheltenham.

== Churches ==
The churches in the deanery include:

- St Gregory the Great, Cheltenham
- St Thomas More, Cheltenham, served from St Gregory the Great
- Sacred Hearts of Jesus and Mary, Charlton Kings, Cheltenham
- St Catharine, Chipping Campden
- St Benet, Kemerton
- Our Lady and St Kenelm, Stow-on-the-Wold
- St Nicholas, Winchcombe.

== Gallery ==
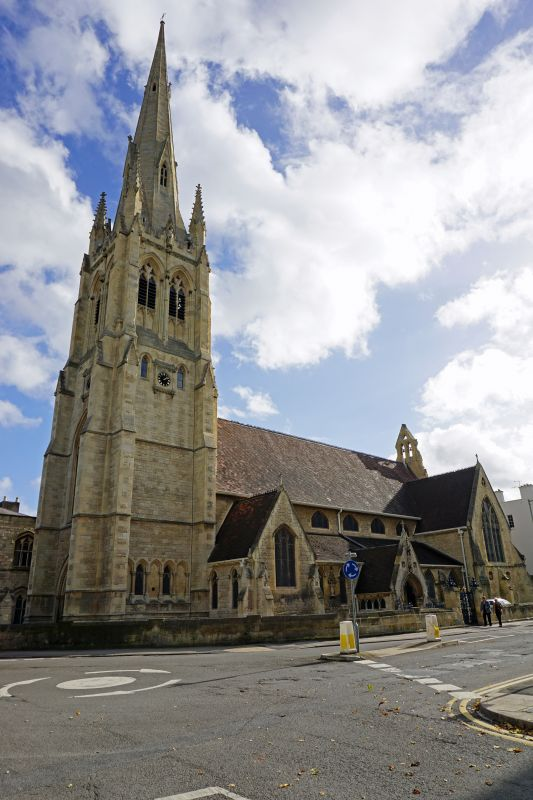
St Gregory's Church, Cheltenham

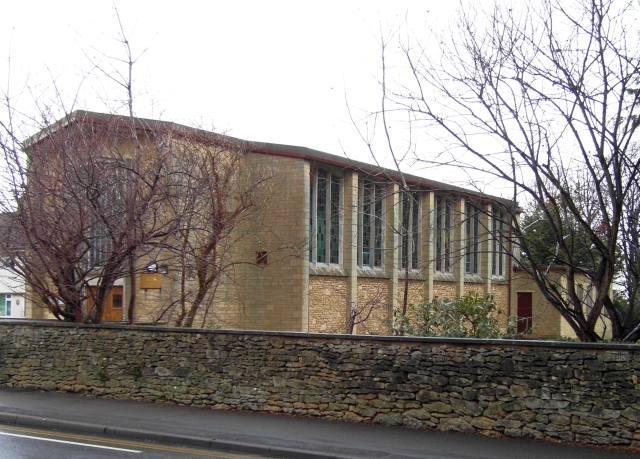
Sacred Hearts of Jesus and Mary Church, Charlton Kings

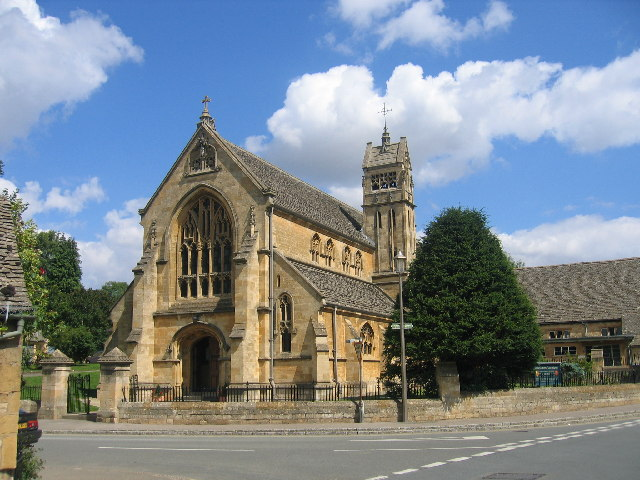
St Catharine's Church, Chipping Campden

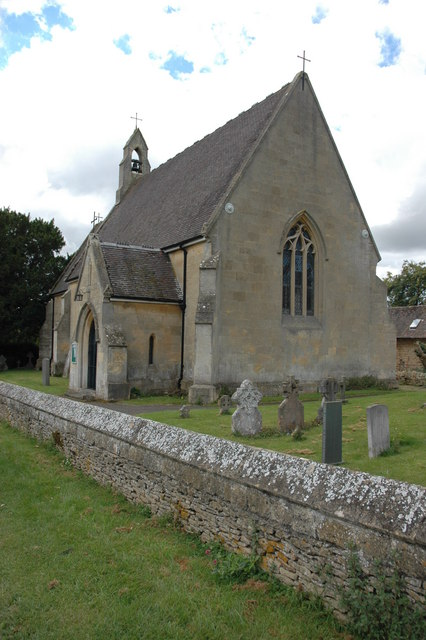
St Benet's Church, Kemerton

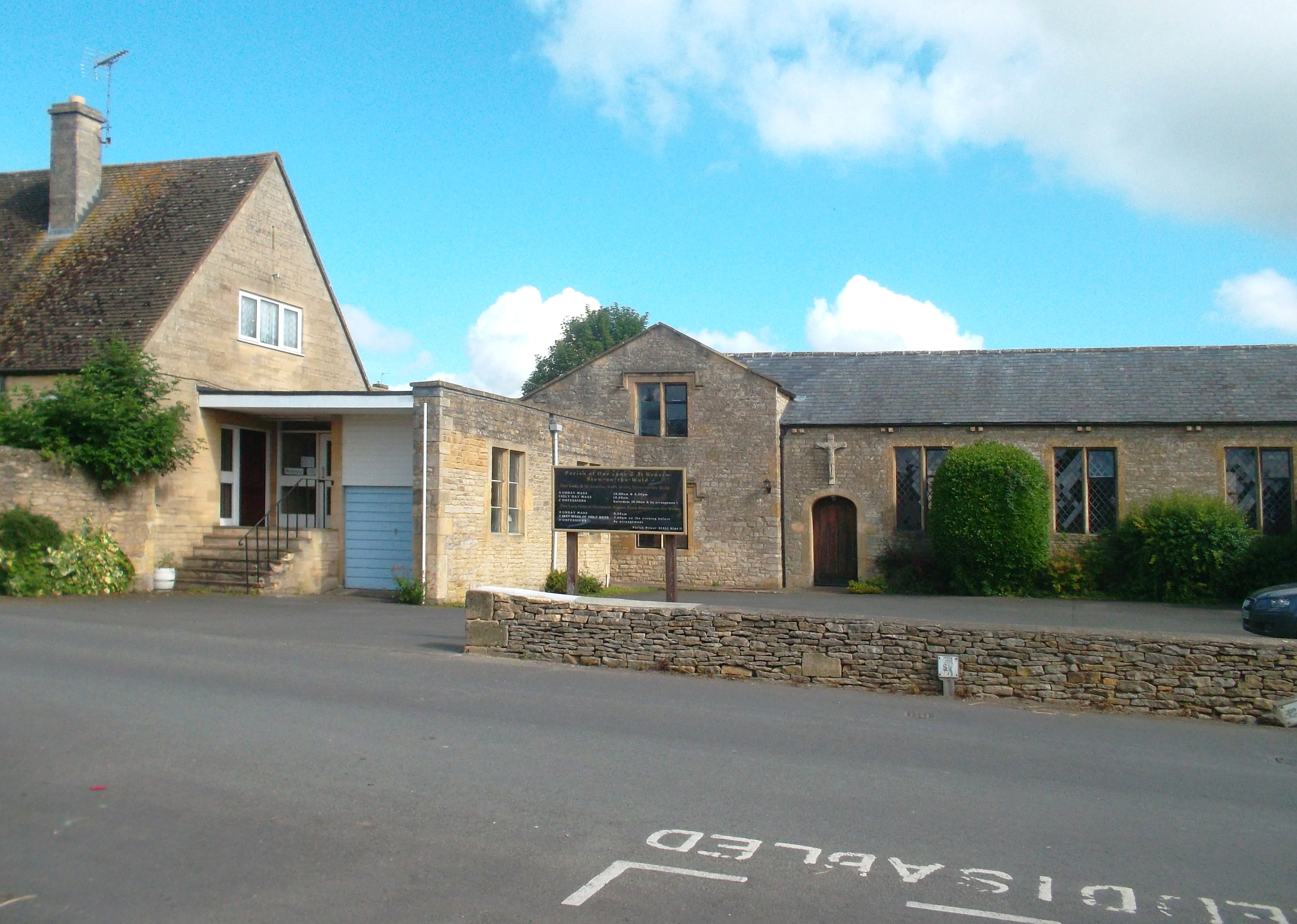
Our Lady and St Kenelm, Stow-on-the-Wold
