= 19–21 Sankey Street, Warrington =

- Location in Cheshire
- 53.3889°N 2.5943°W
- Location: Warrington, Cheshire, England
- OS grid reference: SJ 606 881

History
- Built: 1864
- Built for: Robert Garrett and Sons

Site notes
- Architect: John Douglas
- Architectural style: Gothic Revival

Listed Building – Grade II
- Designated: 4 April 1975
- Reference no.: 1139405

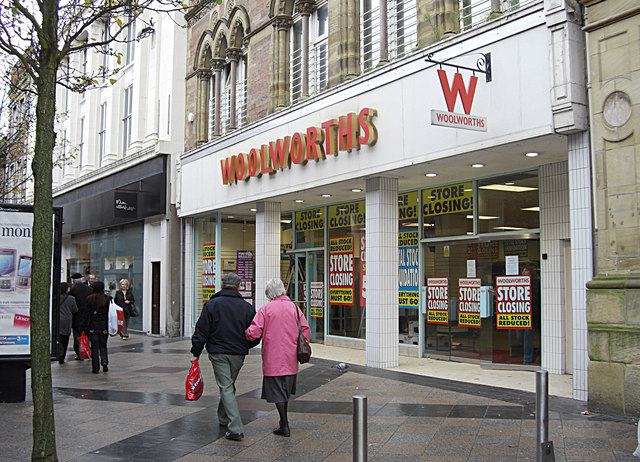
An image of the storefront in 2008

19–21 Sankey Street is a shop in Warrington, Cheshire, England. It is recorded in the National Heritage List for England as a designated Grade II listed building.

== History ==
The building was designed by the Chester architect John Douglas and was one of his earliest works. It was constructed in 1864 as the showrooms for the furniture makers Robert Garnett and Sons, whose factory was directly behind the shop. The original shop front has been replaced by one of more modern design. In 1999 the building was occupied by a Woolworth's shop.

== Architecture ==
=== Structure ===
The building has three storeys and is in Gothic Revival style. As originally built, the ground floor consisted of carved stone piers and arcading. The remaining upper storeys are constructed in red sandstone with dressings of lighter-coloured stone. The middle storey contains one three-light and three two-light windows. Over each light is a pointed arch supported by a free-standing polished granite column. The voussoirs over each arch consist of stones of alternating red and a lighter colour. The top storey has four two-light windows, similar to those in the middle storey, but simpler in design. Between the two storeys is a carved frieze. Along the top of the frontage is an elaborate corbelled cornice.

=== Critique ===
Douglas' biographer, Edward Hubbard, was of the opinion that the design of the building was influenced by the writings of John Ruskin and George Gilbert Scott, particularly in the use of polychromy. He considered that it was "in its way one of the best thing he [Douglas] ever did, and it would be difficult to better it as an example of mid-Victorian street architecture". The authors of the Buildings of England series state that it has "a High Victorian Gothic façade of the most refined kind", and consider that it is one of Douglas' "very best works".

== See also ==
- Listed buildings in Warrington (unparished area)
- List of non-ecclesiastical and non-residential works by John Douglas
