= Messrs. Crosfield's Transporter Bridge =

Messrs. Crosfield’s Transporter Bridge was a transporter bridge in Warrington, England, United Kingdom, which was built in 1905 by Mr. James Newall for the factory of Messrs. Joseph Crosfield and Son to connect a new part of the factory south of the Mersey river with the existing factory part which lay to the north of the Mersey river.

As there was vessel traffic with tall ships on Mersey river in those days, a transporter bridge with a clearance of 22.86 metres (75 ft) was chosen to provide the desired crossing. The transporter bridge was realized as suspension bridge with wind guy cables, which were fixed on crossbars at the support towers. While the tower on the south site was completely free-standing, that on the north bank was erected on the roof of a warehouse building of the factory. The bridge had a span of 76.2 metres (250 ft) and a gondola capable of transporting a load of 2.5 tons.

In 1915, it was supplemented by the still existing Warrington Transporter Bridge, as it was not able to handle heavy loads. In later years, it was decommissioned and converted into a pipeline bridge before it was demolished.
