= Saint Elphin =

Elphin of Warrington (died 679) was a Christian saint who lived in the North West of England in the 7th century, and is considered the patron saint of the town of Warrington.

== Life ==
Little is known about his life, but according to tradition he was a companion of Saint Oswald at Iona. When Oswald became king of Northumbria and moved his country residence to Makerfield, Elphin accompanied him and Oswald built a wooden church for him on the site of the present parish church in Warrington. The Domesday Book also describes two carucates of land in the Hundred of Newton-in-Makerfield as belonging to St Elphin. He was martyred in 679.

== Dedications ==
St Elphin's Church, Warrington, known for its 281-foot spire, is dedicated to St Elphin. Also dedicated to him was St Elphin's School, a boarding school founded in Warrington that moved to Darley Dale, Derbyshire; it closed in 2005.
