= Grade I and II* listed buildings in Warrington =

There are over 9,000 Grade I listed buildings and 20,000 Grade II* listed buildings in England. This page is a list of these buildings in the unitary authority of Warrington in Cheshire, including the town of Warrington and 18 other civil parishes.

== Grade I ==
Name	Location	Type	Completed (Note: The date given is the date used by Historic England as significant for the initial building or that of an important part in the structure's description.)	Date designated	Grid ref. (Note: Sometimes known as OSGB36, the grid reference is based on the British national grid reference system used by the Ordnance Survey.) Geo-coordinates	Notes	Entry number (Note: The "List Entry Number" is a unique number assigned to each listed building and scheduled monument by Historic England.)	Image
Sankey Viaduct	Burtonwood and Westbrook, Warrington	Railway Viaduct	1830	21 February 1977	SJ5687094711; 53°26′51″N 2°39′01″W	The first railway viaduct to be built in the world, it was designed by George Stephenson for the Liverpool and Manchester Railway Company to carry the railway across the Sankey Valley. It is constructed in brick faced with sandstone ashlar. The viaduct is carried on nine semicircular arches.	1075927	Sankey Viaduct More images
St Wilfrid's Church, Grappenhall	Grappenhall and Thelwall, Warrington	Church	12th century	8 January 1970	SJ6394386300; 53°22′20″N 2°32′36″W	There is some Norman fabric in the south wall of the nave, the south chapel was built as a chantry in about 1334, and the tower and most of the rest of the church date from 1525–39. The clerestory was added in 1833, and the north vestry in 1851. In 1873–74 Paley and Austin carried out a restoration.	1139320	St Wilfrid's Church, Grappenhall More images
Lymm Cross	Lymm, Warrington	Cross	Early to mid-17th century	24 January 1950	SJ6833787244; 53°22′52″N 2°28′39″W	This is a sandstone structure standing on an artificially stepped sandstone outcrop. The shaft of the cross is contained in a square pavilion with square corner pillars, which has a roof with pedimented gables and a ball finial.	1227014	Lymm Cross More images
St Oswald's Church	Winwick, Warrington	Church	Early 13th century	9 August 1966	SJ6037592833; 53°25′51″N 2°35′52″W	Additions and alterations have been made over the centuries, including the rebuilding of the chancel, sanctuary and vestry by A. W. N. Pugin in 1847–49, and the rebuilding of the spire and restoration of the church in 1869 by Paley and Austin. The church is constructed in sandstone, and has a west tower. Many of the furnishings were designed by Pugin. Inside the church is the cross-arm of an Anglo-Saxon preaching cross dating from around 750.	1278428	St Oswald's Church More images
Eastern Outbuilding, Town Hall	Warrington	House	1750	4 April 1975	SJ6026088267; 53°23′23″N 2°35′56″W	This was built as offices for Bank Hall, and were later used by the local authority. The building has a three-bay rusticated and pedimented centre, and five brick bays on each side.	1329748	Eastern Outbuilding, Town Hall
Town Hall	Warrington	Town Hall	1750	6 December 1949	SJ6021888266; 53°23′23″N 2°35′59″W	Designed by James Gibbs as a country house, named Bank House, for Thomas Patten, this in Palladian style. It has three storeys and a hipped slate roof. The house is constructed in red brick and rusticated stone. In the centre is full-height portico with Composite columns carrying a pediment bearing the arms of the Patten family. The entrance is in the middle storey and is approached by a double staircase.	1329725	Town Hall More images
Western Outbuilding, Town Hall	Warrington	House	1750	6 December 1949	SJ6017688259; 53°23′23″N 2°36′01″W	This was built as stables for Bank Hall, and were later used as offices by the local authority. The building has a three-bay rusticated and pedimented centre, and three brick bays on each side.	1261276	Western Outbuilding, Town Hall

== Grade II* ==
Name	Location	Type	Completed	Date designated	Grid ref. Geo-coordinates	Notes	Entry number	Image
Tanyard Farm Farmbuilding	Appleton, Warrington	Barn	Late 16th century	23 December 1983	SJ6573783844; 53°21′01″N 2°30′58″W	This originated as a threshing barn, cartshed and stable, which form an L-shaped plan. It is timber-framed, with brick nogging, and stands on a sandstone plinth. It is roofed with blue tiles. The timber framing includes four crucks, two of which are complete, the other two are sawn off near the top.	1139363	Upload Photo
Bewsey Old Hall	Bewsey, Burtonwood and Westbrook, Warrington	House	Late 16th century	4 December 1951	SJ5907089572; 53°24′05″N 2°37′01″W	The hall underwent alterations during the 17th to the 19th centuries, and was restored and partly rebuilt in the 20th century, but only a fragment of the original hall has survived. What does survive has an L-shaped plan, and is in three storeys. It is constructed in brick with stone dressings and slate roofs, and has mullioned or mullioned and transomed windows. The moated site on which the hall stands is a scheduled monument.	1230619	Bewsey Old Hall More images
Gatehouse to Bradley (or Bradlegh) Old Hall	Burtonwood and Westbrook, Warrington	Gatehouse	c. 1460	4 December 1951	SJ5717293902; 53°26′24″N 2°38′46″W	The gatehouse to the hall, now partly in ruins. It is constructed in sandstone, forming an archway above the entrance to the drive. The surviving features include the arch, which is four-centred with colonnettes (small columns), the springers of the fallen vault, and octagonal canted mock turrets supported by buttresses at the four corners.	1278505	Gatehouse to Bradley (or Bradlegh) Old Hall More images
Holcroft Hall	Culcheth, Culcheth and Glazebury, Warrington	Farmhouse	Late 15th to early 16th century	15 November 1966	SJ6797995162; 53°27′08″N 2°29′01″W	A farmhouse that has been altered and extended. It is constructed in rendered brick with a slate roof. It is in two storeys with an attic, and has four bays, including an added wing. The windows are mullioned. Inside the house is another mullioned window, moulded beams, and a priest hole.	1159651	Holcroft Hall More images
North Barn at Hurst Hall	Glazebury, Culcheth and Glazebury, Warrington	Hall House	Late 15th century or earlier	22 August 1983	SJ6685496903; 53°28′04″N 2°30′03″W	This is part of what was originally on old hall, later converted into a barn. It is basically timber framed with brick cladding and a stone slate roof. It is in two bays, with an extra half-bay at each end. The timber roof is open, of unusual construction for the region, and said to be "spectacular".	1139388	Upload Photo
Lymm Hall	Lymm, Warrington	House	Late 16th century	24 January 1950	SJ6843987041; 53°22′45″N 2°28′33″W	Constructed in sandstone and brick, it was originally an E-shaped Elizabethan moated house. Since then, the hall has been altered and restored, particularly in the 19th century.	1265849	Upload Photo
St John the Evangelist's Church	Walton, Warrington	Church	1882–83	23 December 1983	SJ5984685254; 53°21′45″N 2°36′18″W	The church was designed by Paley and Austin, and paid for by Sir Gilbert Greenall. It is in Decorated style, and constructed in sandstone with Westmorland green slate roofs. The church has a cruciform plan, with a large central tower decorated with chequerwork and surmounted by an octagonal spire.	1139352	St John the Evangelist's Church More images
Myddleton Hall	Houghton Green, Winwick, Warrington	Hall House	1658	9 August 1966	SJ6199592973; 53°25′56″N 2°34′24″W	A brick country house standing on a sandstone plinth with sandstone dressings. It is in two storeys and consists of a hall with two cross wings, and another right wing. The windows are mullioned and/or transomed. Some of the 19th-century additions have been demolished.	1231049	Upload Photo
St Ann's Church	Warrington	Church	1866–68	24 October 1974	SJ6054889042; 53°23′48″N 2°35′41″W	Designed by John Douglas in High Victorian Gothic style. It is constructed in red brick with dressings in blue brick. The church has a tower and an apsidal chancel. It is now redundant, and was converted into an indoor climbing centre in 1996.	1161591	St Ann's Church More images
St Elphin's Church	Warrington	Church	14th century	6 December 1949	SJ6153288397; 53°23′28″N 2°34′48″W	The earliest fabric in the church dates from the 14th century. Following damage in the Civil War, the tower was rebuilt in 1696 and the nave in 1770. The south aisle was added in the early 19th century. Most of the fabric of the present church results from an extensive restoration between 1859 and 1867 by Frederick and Horace Francis, during which the spire was added. The spire is 281 feet (86 m) high, and one of the highest in England. The north transept forms the regimental chapel of the South Lancashire Regiment.	1329734	St Elphin's Church More images
Church of St Luke	Warrington	Church	1892–93	4 April 1975	SJ5918687795; 53°23′07″N 2°36′54″W	A sandstone church with tiled roofs designed by Bodley and Garner, it is now redundant. It consists of a nave, north aisle, chancel and south porch. There is a bellcote on the east end of the nave. The church is unusual in that it has a central nave arcade and another arcade between the nave and the aisle.	1329757	Church of St Luke More images
Holy Trinity Church	Warrington	Church	1758	6 December 1949	SJ6059788168; 53°23′22″N 2°35′30″W	This is a Georgian church designed in the style of James Gibbs. Its front is in sandstone, the back in brick with stone dressings. A clock tower was added to the west of the church in 1862. Further alterations were made during the 20th century. Features include a Doric doorcase, with Ionic pilasters above, a cornice and a plain parapet. In the east wall is a Venetian window.	1161522	Holy Trinity Church More images
Cromwell's House	Warrington	House	17th century	6 December 1949	SJ6130488348; 53°23′26″N 2°35′00″W	This probably originated as a single house, later divided into three cottages. It is timber-framed with painted brick infill on a stone plinth. There are two storeys, the upper storey being jettied. The windows are casements with wooden mullions. At the rear are single-storey extensions, and three half-dormers.	1310102	Cromwell's House More images
Entrance gates, piers and lamps, Town Hall	Warrington	House	1862	4 April 1975	SJ6022688157; 53°23′20″N 2°35′58″W	A set of ornate gates in cast iron, partly gilded, designed by Kershaw and Crook, and made at the Coalbrookdale Company at Ironbridge. They were shown at the International Exhibition in London in 1862, and erected here in 1895. Statues depicting Nike by John Bell stand on the four posts. Among the decorations are the Prince of Wales's feathers and his motto.	1261277	Entrance gates, piers and lamps, Town Hall More images
Lamps on east and west drives of Town Hall	Warrington	House	1750	4 April 1975	SJ6018488207; 53°23′21″N 2°36′00″W	There are lamps part-way down the east and west drives leading to the Town Hall that was designed by James Gibbs.	1239919	Upload Photo
Warrington Transporter Bridge	Warrington	Transporter Bridge	1911–14	4 April 1975	SJ5968187619; 53°23′02″N 2°36′27″W	The transporter bridge was built to carry materials across the River Mersey between two parts of the Crosfield's factory. It is a steel structure with a span of 200 feet (61 m) between the towers. The bridge was designed by William Henry Hunter and built by William Arrol. The structure is also a scheduled monument.	1139433	Warrington Transporter Bridge More images
Barley Mow Public House	Warrington	Public House	1561	6 December 1949	SJ6055388303; 53°23′24″N 2°35′41″W	A timber-framed public house that has been much altered. The front facing Market Place is in elaborate black-and-white work, including quatrefoils, standing on a red sandstone plinth. It is in three storeys, including two jettied gables, and two continuous rows of small-pane windows. Inside the public house is a mixture of original 17th-century and later panelling.	1139399	Barley Mow Public House More images
Barley Mow Public House (side façade)	Warrington	Public House	19th century	6 December 1949	SJ6056088293; 53°23′24″N 2°35′40″W	This façade dates from a 19th-century refronting of the public house that originated in the 16th century. It is in brick, with two storeys and an attic. There is a round-arched entrance flanked by wooden pilasters, and a tympanum that incorporates the carving of a barley sheaf. The windows are sashes, and there are two small blocked windows in the attic.	1310100	Upload Photo

== See also ==
- Grade I listed buildings in Cheshire
- Grade II* listed buildings in Cheshire
- Listed buildings in Warrington (unparished area)

== Sources ==
- Hartwell, Clare; Hyde, Matthew; Hubbard, Edward; Pevsner, Nikolaus (2011) [1971], Cheshire, The Buildings of England, New Haven and London: Yale University Press, ISBN 978-0-300-17043-6
- Pollard, Richard; Pevsner, Nikolaus (2006). Lancashire: Liverpool and the South-West.
