= Church Street, Warrington =

Thoroughfare in England

Coordinates: 53.3905°N 2.58305°W

Church Street is one of the main thoroughfares of Warrington in Cheshire, England, linking the modern town centre to St Elphin's Church, to the east.

== History ==
Church Street formed the nucleus of the mediaeval town, and was the location of fairs and markets. Oliver Cromwell lodged in this area during the English Civil War.

== Conservation area ==
A Conservation area based around Church Street was designated in 1983.
