= Old St Ann's Church, Warrington =

St Ann's (old) Church, Warrington
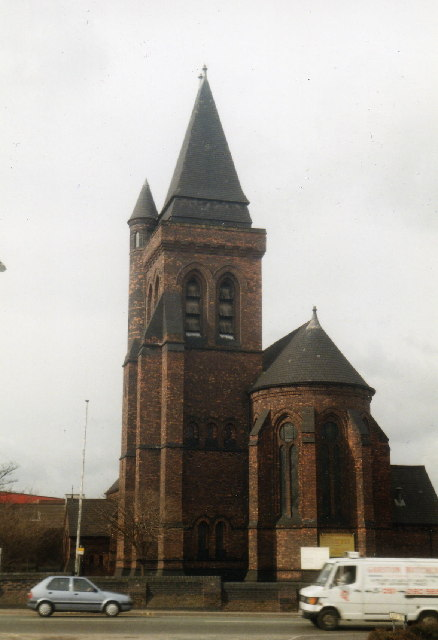
- Southeast aspect of St Ann's Church, Warrington
- St Ann's (old) Church, Warrington
- 53.39670°N 2.59475°W
- OS grid reference: SJ 606 890
- Location: Warrington, Cheshire
- Country: England
- Denomination: Anglican

History
- Consecrated: 27 February 1869

Architecture
- Functional status: Redundant
- Heritage designation: Grade II*
- Designated: 24 October 1974
- Architect: John Douglas
- Architectural type: Church
- Style: Gothic Revival
- Groundbreaking: 1866
- Closed: 1966

Specifications
- Materials: Red brick with blue brick dressings Slate roof

St Ann's Church is a redundant Anglican church in Warrington, Cheshire, England. It is recorded in the National Heritage List for England as a designated Grade II* listed building. The church was closed for worship in November 1995, and since 1996 has been used as an indoor climbing centre. From the mid-1960s to the mid-1980s the church was heated by steam from the then adjacent Tetley Walker's brewery. A new church, also dedicated to St Ann, was built on a different site half a mile away in 2000.

== History ==
The church was built between 1866 and 1868 to a design by John Douglas. There were delays caused by bad weather, and it was not until local solicitor William Beamont paid the builder that the church was consecrated, on 27 February 1869. In 1996 it became a climbing centre with a mezzanine in the chancel. These changes are said to be reversible.

== Architecture ==
The church is built in red brick with some dressings in blue brick and it has a slate roof. Its plan consists of a six-bay nave without aisles, an apsidal chancel, north and south porches, a north vestry and a southeast tower. The tower is in the angle between the nave and the chancel and in three stages. In the lower stage is a single lancet window and in the second stage are three similar windows. The third stage contains pairs of louvred bell openings and above these is a corbelled parapet. On the southwest corner is a stair-turret rising to the height of the tower and capped by a tall conical-roofed turret rising above the parapet. On top of the tower is a tall steeply pitched saddleback roof. In the sanctuary (but currently obscured) are paintings of The Evangelists by Westlake, dated 1868, which were repainted by T. Hesketh in 1894.

Edward Hubbard describes its architecture as being "quite startlingly bold and original". In the Buildings of England series it is described as being "an impressively forceful High Victorian work..., bold and uncompromising", and the "bizarre juxtaposition" of the climbing walls and 19th-century architecture is described as "strangely enjoyable".

== See also ==
- Grade I and II* listed buildings in Warrington
- List of new churches by John Douglas
