= St Alban's Church, Warrington =

Coordinates: 53.3930°N 2.5970°W

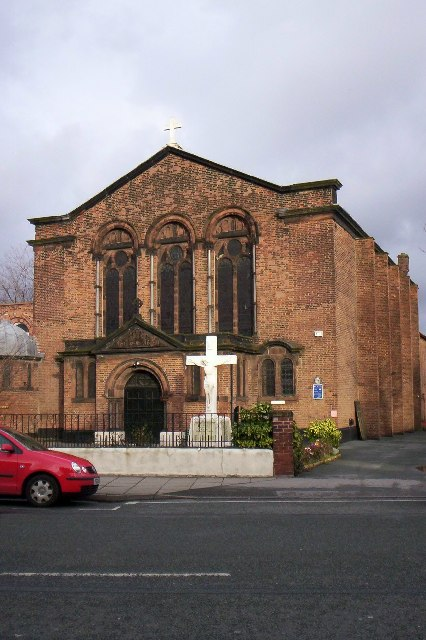
- St Alban's Church, Warrington, west end

- Location in Cheshire
- OS grid reference: SJ 603 886
- Location: Bewsey Street, Warrington, Cheshire
- Country: England
- Denomination: Roman Catholic
- Website: The Parish of Sacred Heart & St Alban Warrington

History
- Status: Parish church
- Dedication: Saint Alban

Architecture
- Functional status: Active
- Heritage designation: Grade II
- Designated: 4 April 1975
- Architect(s): Edward Alcock, Peter Paul Pugin
- Architectural type: Church
- Groundbreaking: 1823
- Completed: 1909

Specifications
- Materials: Brick

Administration
- Diocese: Liverpool

Clergy
- Priest: Fr Christopher Cunningham

St Alban's Church is in Bewsey Street near to the centre of the town of Warrington, Cheshire, England. It is an active Roman Catholic church in the Archdiocese of Liverpool. The church forms part of the parish of Sacred Heart and Saint Alban. The church is recorded in the National Heritage List for England as a designated Grade II listed building.

== History ==
The parish was founded in 1772 by the Benedictine monks of Ampleforth Abbey, and was the first Roman Catholic church in the town after the Reformation. The present building dates from 1823 and was designed by Edward Alcock. In 1893 the sanctuary, designed by Peter Paul Pugin, was added to the church. The west façade was refashioned in 1909.

A war memorial is situated outside the front of the church, depicting the crucifixion of Jesus. On 30 October 2026, the sculpture of Jesus on the memorial was decapitated by vandals, who also used green and black graffiti on the sculpture's body. Reverend Canon Christopher Cunningham described the act as "evil", and said that "rather offensive language against the Catholic Church and against Christ himself" had been added. Cheshire Constabulary stated that they were treating the incident as a hate crime. A 42-year-old man was later detained by police under the Mental Health Act in connection with the incident.

== Architecture ==
The church is built in brick. Its plan consists of a nave with a shallow apsidal sanctuary, a west porch and a five-sided baptistry at the northwest corner. The porch is pedimented and has a round-headed archway with two orders. Above this are three round-arched windows and the roof is gabled.

The altar, reredos and sanctuary area were designed by Peter Paul Pugin. The stone and alabaster free-standing and canopied altar was made by Boulton's of Cheltenham. On the north side of the sanctuary is the Lady Altar, also by Pugin. The paintings, which depict saints, were executed by Joseph Pippett of Birmingham. The reredos depicts the legend of St Alban. The stained glass in the west windows and in the windows in the north and south walls also depict saints. The parish registers go back to 1774.

== See also ==
- Listed buildings in Warrington (unparished area)
