= Warrington bombings =

1993 IRA attack in Cheshire, England

Coordinates: 53°23′19″N 2°35′36″W

- Part of the Troubles
- Location: Warrington, Cheshire, England
- Date: 26 February 1993; 04:10 (GMT); 20 March 1993; 12:25 (GMT)
- Target: 1st attack: a gas storage facility 2nd attack: Bridge Street
- Attack type: Bombing
- Deaths: 2
- Injuries: 56
- Perpetrator: Provisional IRA

The Warrington bombings were two bomb attacks that took place during early 1993 in Warrington, Cheshire, England. The first attack happened on 26 February, when a bomb exploded at a gas storage facility. This first explosion caused extensive damage, but no injuries. While fleeing the scene, the bombers shot and injured a police officer and two of the bombers were caught after a high-speed car chase. The second attack happened on 20 March, when two smaller bombs exploded in litter bins outside shops and businesses on Bridge Street. Two children were killed and 56 people were injured.

The attacks were carried out by the Provisional Irish Republican Army (IRA). From the early 1970s, the IRA had been carrying out attacks in both Northern Ireland and England with the stated goal of putting pressure on the UK Government to withdraw from Northern Ireland.

== First attack ==
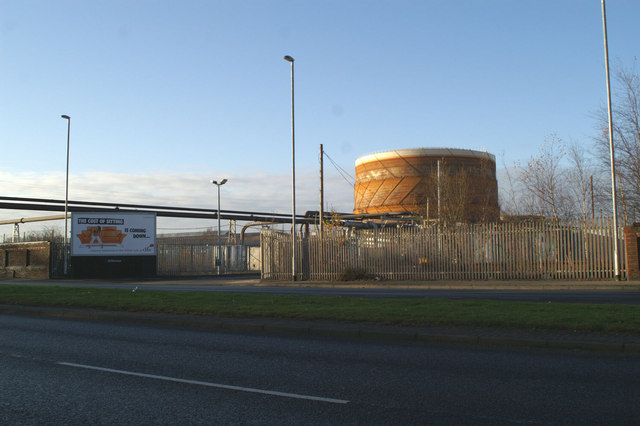
Site of the first bombing as seen in January 2009

On the night of 25 February 1993, three IRA members planted Semtex bombs at the gas holders on Winwick Road, Warrington. At 11:45 pm that night, a police officer stopped the three men in a van on Sankey Street. As he was questioning them, the IRA members shot him three times and sped off in the van. About an hour later, they hijacked a car in Lymm, put the driver in the boot and drove off towards Manchester. At about 1 am, police spotted the car and chased it along the M62 motorway in the direction of Warrington. Shots were fired during the high-speed chase and two police vehicles were hit. Police stopped the car on the motorway near Croft and arrested two of the IRA members: Páidric MacFhloinn (age 40) and Denis Kinsella (age 25). The third member, Michael Timmins, escaped. At 4:10 am on 26 February, the bombs exploded at the gas holders, sending a fireball 1,000 feet (300 m) into the sky and causing extensive damage to the facility. The emergency services arrived and evacuated about 100 people from their homes. There was much disruption to transport that morning as police set up roadblocks and trains were diverted away from Warrington.

In 1994, MacFhloinn was sentenced to 35 years in prison and Kinsella to 25 years for their part in the bombing. John Kinsella (age 49) was sentenced to 20 years for possessing Semtex explosives that he had hidden for the IRA unit. These explosives were previously supplied by Libyan dictator Muammar Gaddafi.

== Second attack ==
Shortly before midday on Saturday, 20 March 1993, The Samaritans in Liverpool received a bomb warning by telephone. According to police, the caller said only that a bomb had been planted outside a Boots shop. Merseyside Police sent officers to branches of Boots in Liverpool and warned the Cheshire Constabulary, who patrolled nearby Warrington. About 30 minutes later, at about 12:25, two bombs exploded on Bridge Street in Warrington, about 100 yards (90 m) apart. The blasts happened within a minute of each other. One exploded outside Boots and McDonald's, and one outside the Argos catalogue store. The area was crowded with shoppers. Witnesses said that shoppers fled from the first explosion into the path of the second. It was later found that the bombs had been placed inside cast-iron litter bins, causing large amounts of shrapnel. Buses were organised to ferry people away from the scene and 20 paramedics and crews from 17 ambulances were sent to deal with the aftermath.

Three-year-old Johnathan Ball died at the scene. He had been in town with his babysitter, shopping for a Mother's Day card. The second victim, 12-year-old Tim Parry, was gravely wounded. He died on 25 March 1993 when his life support machine was switched off, after tests had found only minimal brain activity. Another 54 people were injured, four of them seriously. One of the survivors, 32-year-old Bronwen Vickers, the mother of two young daughters, had to have a leg amputated, and died just over a year later from cancer.

The Provisional IRA issued a statement the day after the bombing, acknowledging its involvement but saying:

Responsibility for the tragic and deeply regrettable death and injuries caused in Warrington yesterday lies squarely at the door of those in the British authorities who deliberately failed to act on precise and adequate warnings.

A day later, an IRA spokesman said that "two precise warnings" had been given "in adequate time", one to the Samaritans and one to Merseyside Police. He added: "You don't provide warnings if it is your intention to kill". Cheshire's assistant chief constable denied there had been a second warning and said:

Yes, a warning was given half-an-hour before, but no mention was made of Warrington. If the IRA think they can pass on their responsibility for this terrible act by issuing such a nonsensical statement, they have sadly underestimated the understanding of the British public.

A piece on BBC North West's Inside Out programme in September 2013 speculated that the bombing may have been the work of a "rogue" IRA unit, which was supported by the IRA but operated independently and who used operatives who were from England to avoid suspicion. The programme also examined a possible link between the attack and British leftist political group Red Action, though nothing was ever proven.

== Aftermath ==
The deaths of two young children ensured that the 20 March bombings received major coverage in the media and caused widespread public anger. Shortly after the bombings, a group called "Peace '93" was set up in Dublin. The main organiser was Susan McHugh, a Dublin housewife and mother. On 25 March 1993, thousands held a peace rally in Dublin. They signed a condolence book outside the General Post Office and laid bouquets and wreaths, with messages of sorrow and apology, to be taken to Warrington for the boys' funerals. Some criticised Peace '93 for focusing only on IRA violence and for not responding to the deaths of children in Northern Ireland.

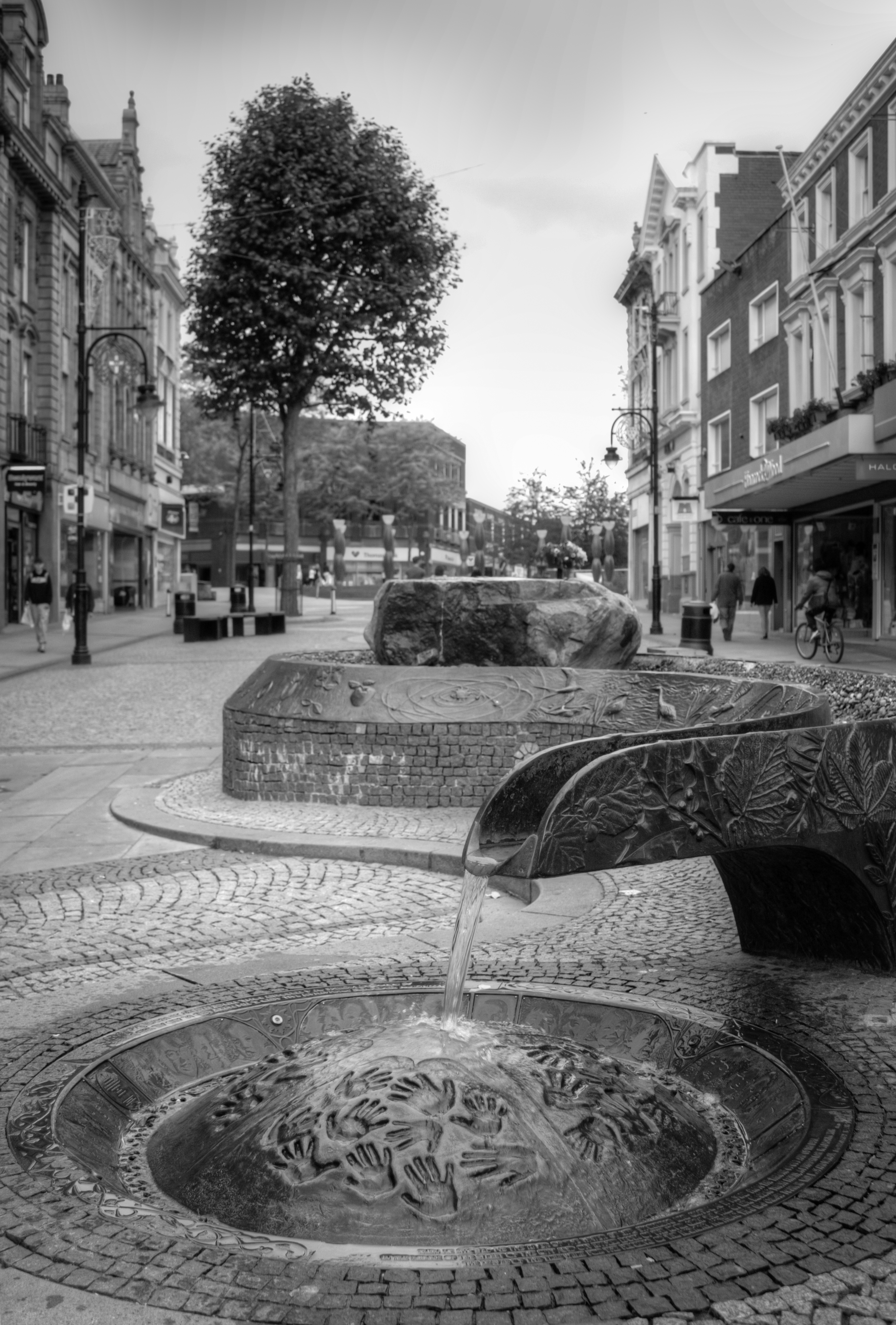
The River of Life memorial fountain in Bridge Street

On 1 April 1993, the Irish Government announced measures designed to make extradition easier from the Republic of Ireland to the United Kingdom.

On 19 September 1994, Irish rock band The Cranberries released the song "Zombie", which was written in protest at the bombings. The song went on to become their biggest hit.

On 14 November 1996, the Duchess of Kent officially inaugurated a memorial called The River of Life, depicting "a symbol of hope for future generations", in Bridge Street. It was developed in the aftermath of the bomb attack and commissioned by the Warrington Borough Council. The project, consisting of a symbolic water sculpture that features a commemorative plaque, was designed by local primary school pupils and Stephen Broadbent.

The parents of Tim Parry set up the Tim Parry Trust Fund to promote greater understanding between Great Britain and Ireland. The Tim Parry Johnathan Ball Foundation for Peace worked jointly with the NSPCC to develop The Peace Centre, close to Warrington town centre, which opened on the seventh anniversary of the attack in 2000. Its purpose was to promote peace and understanding amongst all communities affected by conflict and violence. The centre hosted an annual peace lecture, as well as being home to the local NSPCC and was the home of Warrington Youth Club until 2022. In 2026, the building was converted to a school for children with special educational needs.

The bombings received further attention in 2019 after the Brexit Party selected former Living Marxism writer Claire Fox as their lead candidate in the North West for the 2019 European Parliament election; the Revolutionary Communist Party, of which Fox was a leading member in 1993, defended the IRA's bombing in their party newsletter. Despite the controversy, which saw another Brexit Party candidate resign from the party list in protest at the comments, Fox and the Brexit Party topped the poll in several areas of the North West, including in Warrington.

The killing of Ball and Parry is still on Cheshire Police's list of unsolved murders.

== Made for television film ==
The events around the second bombing, with the killing of two children, and the efforts of the parents of Tim Parry and "Peace '93" and McHugh, were dramatised in the 2018 television film, Mother's Day, starring Vicky McClure, Daniel Mays, and Anna Maxwell Martin.

== See also ==
- Chronology of the Northern Ireland Troubles and peace process
- Chronology of Provisional Irish Republican Army actions
