= The Tim Parry Johnathan Ball Foundation for Peace =

Organization and peace charity

The Tim Parry Johnathan Ball Peace Foundation
- Founded: 1995
- Founder: Colin Parry OBE; Wendy Parry OBE
- Type: Charity
- Registration no.: 1048990
- Purpose: Education of youth and communities in working for peace and non–violent conflict resolution
- Location: Warrington, England
- Region served: Education

The Tim Parry Johnathan Ball Peace Foundation (which changed its name from 'The Tim Parry Johnathan Ball Foundation for Peace' in September 2017) is an educational peace charity based in United Kingdom (charity no.1048990). It was formed in 1995 by Colin and Wendy Parry, following the loss of their 12-year-old son Tim and 3-year-old Johnathan Ball in the 1993 Warrington bomb attacks, which were perpetrated by the Provisional Irish Republican Army.

The Foundation raises money through donation, corporate support, sponsoring a participant, support from charitable trusts and foundations, Big Lottery Fund, Gifts in Kind, Gift Aid, In memoriam donations. The Foundation lost its funding for the Survivors for Peace programme from the National Lottery in 2014.

== The Peace Centre ==
A purpose-built youth and community education and recreation centre was launched jointly with the foundation and the National Society for the Prevention of Cruelty to Children (NSPCC) in 2000. The launch coincided with the seven-year anniversary of the IRA bombings.

In 2026 the building was converted to a school for children with special educational needs.
