= St Elphin's Church, Warrington =

Coordinates: 53.3910°N 2.5799°W

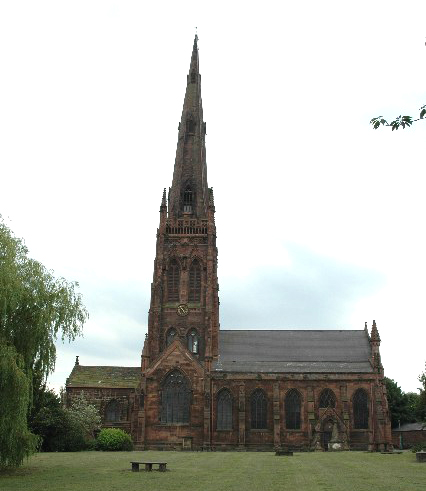
- St Elphin's Church, Warrington

- Location in Cheshire
- OS grid reference: SJ 616,885
- Location: Warrington, Cheshire
- Country: England
- Denomination: Anglican
- Website: St Elphin, Warrington

History
- Status: Parish church

Architecture
- Functional status: Active
- Heritage designation: Grade II*
- Designated: 6 December 1949
- Architect(s): Frederick Francis and Horace Francis
- Architectural type: Church
- Style: Gothic, Gothic Revival
- Completed: 1867

Administration
- Province: York
- Diocese: Liverpool
- Archdeaconry: Warrington
- Deanery: Warrington
- Parish: Warrington

Clergy
- Rector: Revd. June Steventon

St Elphin's Church is the parish church of the town of Warrington, Cheshire, England. The church is recorded in the National Heritage List for England as a designated Grade II* listed building. It is an active Anglican parish church in the diocese of Liverpool, the archdeaconry of Warrington and the deanery of Warrington.

== History ==
A place of worship has been present on the site since about 650 AD, and the presence of a priest in Warrington was recorded in the Domesday Book. According to tradition the first church was built by Saint Oswald for his companion Elphin, who remained as the first priest there until his death in 679. The earliest fabric in the present church is in the chancel and the crypt, which survive from the church built in 1354 by Sir William Boteler. The church was badly damaged by the Parliamentary forces in the Civil War. Following this the tower was rebuilt in 1696 and the nave in 1770. The south aisle was added in the early 19th century. Most of the fabric of the present church is the result of an extensive restoration between 1859 and 1867 by Frederick and Horace Francis. It was during this restoration that the spire was added. The bells were recast in 1698 and again in 1884. In 1950 they were recast again and the clock was replaced.

Within the church, St Ann's Chapel was founded by Thomas Massey, rector of Warrington from 1448 to 1464. It continued to belong to the Massey family until they died out in 1748. The chapel was then acquired by the Patten family who built a vault to bury members of the family, the last being Lord Winmarleigh in 1892. The Lady Chapel was founded and endowed by Sir John Boteler in 1290. He and other family members were buried in the chapel. In 1943 it became the chapel of the South Lancashire Regiment and in 1976 the chapel of the Queen's Lancashire Regiment.

== Architecture ==
=== Exterior ===
The plan of the church consists of a wide nave, wide north and south aisles with a chapel at the eastern end of each aisle, a central tower with a tall spire at the crossing, and a chancel.

=== Interior ===
- In the aisles are galleries containing pews with doors.
- The reredos dates from 1933 which was further decorated in 1999 by Ronald Sims.
- Some of the stained glass in the church is by Pugin. This was damaged in the second world war and has been re-set. Other glass is by A. Gibbs.
- The monuments include tablets to Dr Thomas Percival, who died in 1804, by H. Rouw (brother of Peter Rouw), and to Thomas Lyon, who died in 1818, by Webster of Kendal.
- The regimental chapel in the south transept includes a number of ancient monuments. These include an effigy to Lady Alicia Boteler from the early 14th century and an alabaster monument to Sir John Boteler who died in 1463 and his wife. The screen is a Boer War memorial dated 1903 by William and Segar Owen. The stained glass in the chapel is a Second World War memorial by Hugh Ray Easton dated 1947.
- The St Ann's Chapel in the north transept contains monuments to the Massey and Patten families.
- A pipe organ was installed in 1876 by the London firm of Gray & Davison at a cost of £1,296. Additions were made by the same firm in 1881. It was rebuilt in 1902 by the Manchester firm of Alexander Young and Sons. At this stage the organ was divided in two, placed on galleries over the north and south transepts. It was rebuilt in 1946 - for about £6,000 - by the Liverpool firm of Rushworth & Draper Ltd. when the organ was re-arranged with part being placed on a gallery at the west end, while the rest remained only on the gallery in the south transept. This fine three manual and pedal instrument is no longer used. Instead, in November 2005 an electronic organ of twenty audio channels and 61 stops - also with three manuals and pedal - was provided by the Darwen (Lancashire) firm of Phoenix Organs.

=== Spire ===
The church is dominated by its spire, 281 feet (86 m) high. It is

- the fifth highest parish church in the UK, after the St. Walburge's Church, Preston, St. James Church, Louth, St Mary Redcliffe, and St. Wulfram's Church, Grantham.
- the eighth highest spire in England, after the above four and Salisbury Cathedral, Norwich Cathedral, and Coventry Cathedral.

== External features ==
The gateway to the church dates from the 18th century. It consists of two stone rusticated gate piers surmounted by a cornice and urns. Between these are two iron gates over which is a curved iron arch. To the sides are low stone side walls and small iron side gates for pedestrians. The gateway is listed at Grade II. Also listed Grade II are the cobbles and the pavement leading to the gateway. The church and its grounds lie within the Church Street Conservation area.

== See also ==
- Grade I and II* listed buildings in Warrington
- St Elphin's School - founded by St Elphin's Church
- Listed buildings in Warrington (unparished area)
- Church Street (Warrington)
