= Battle of Warrington Bridge (1651) =

Part of the Third English Civil War

- Part of the Third English Civil War
Date	13 August 1651
Location	Warrington Bridge, Cheshire 53°23′08″N 2°35′28″W
Result	Royalist victory

Belligerents
Parliamentarians	(Kingdom of Scotland) Scottish Royalists

Commanders and leaders
Thomas Harrison; John Lambert	Charles II

Strength
12,000	16,000

Casualties and losses
Unknown	Unknown
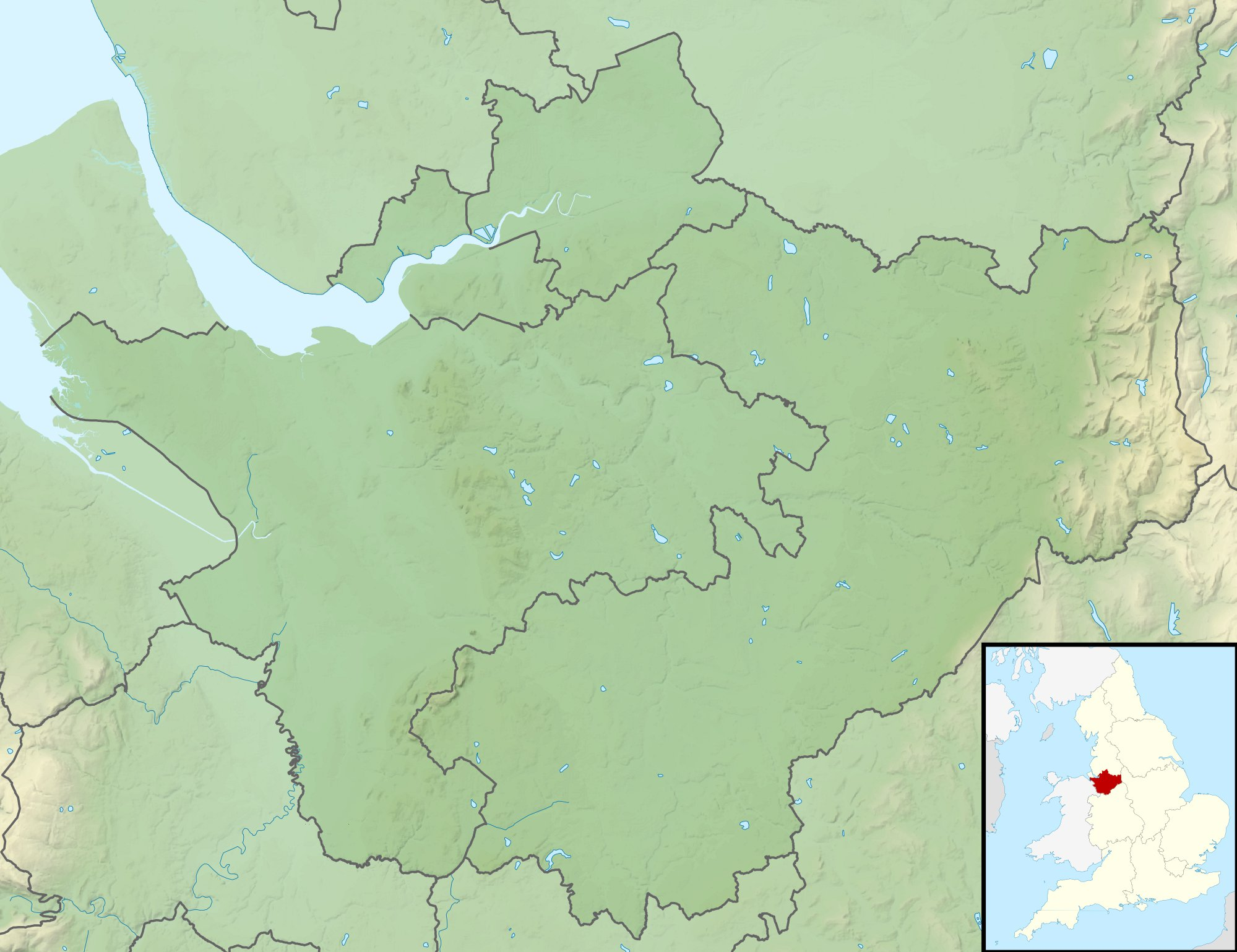
- Cheshire

The Battle of Warrington Bridge was a skirmish fought on 13 August 1651 between the invading Royalist Scottish army of Charles II and Parliamentary forces under the command of Major-General John Lambert.

== Prelude ==
Lambert returned to England from Scotland with a cavalry corps that had accompanied Oliver Cromwell when he invaded Scotland. His orders were to harass the Royalist army. Major-General Thomas Harrison had been left in command of Parliamentary forces in England. Harrison and Lambert's forces rendezvoused near Warrington.

== Battle ==
The united forces of Harrison and Lambert, reinforced by some 3,000 militia from Staffordshire and Cheshire, amounting to some 3,000 foot and 9,000 horse took up position at the Bridge at Warrington, over the Mersey where it divided the Counties of Lancashire and Cheshire, and prepared to resist its passage by the Scots. Lambert sent a few troops north to skirmish with the advanced guard whilst occupying the bridge and preparing it for defence. The skirmishers encountered the royalists two miles north of the town and were quickly dispersed. The royalists then pressed on into the town reaching the bridge at noon.

On reaching the bridge the Scots at once attacked and a sharp fight ensued between their advance guard and Harrison's troops. The Cheshire foot who were posted there held their ground for an hour and a half; with 2,000 Scots sent in against them they were for a time hard pressed. When Lambert found the Scots were in considerable force he fell back, after his men had done what damage to the bridge they could. His retreat was quickened by pressure from the Scots' attack.

== Aftermath ==
Lambert's rapid retreat enabled the Royalists to claim they had forced the bridge and won a victory.
