= Warrington Transporter Bridge =

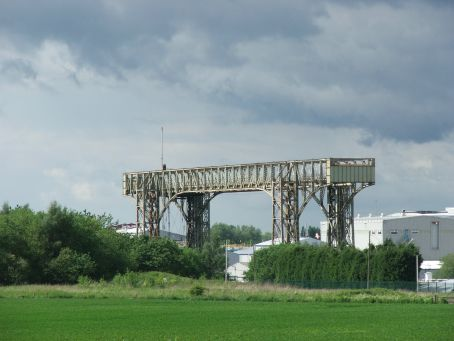
- Coordinates: 53.3838°N 2.6075°W
- Carries: Vehicles; Pedestrians
- Crosses: River Mersey
- Locale: Warrington
- Other name: Bank Quay Transporter Bridge
- Owner: Warrington Borough Council
- Heritage status: Grade II*

Characteristics
- Design: Transporter Bridge
- Material: Steel
- Total length: 103 m (339 ft)
- Width: 9 m (30 ft)
- Height: 27 m (89 ft)
- Longest span: 61 m (200 ft)
- Clearance below: 23 m (76 ft)

History
- Designer: William Henry Hunter
- Constructed by: Sir William Arrol & Co.
- Construction start: 1913; 113 years ago
- Opened: 1916; 110 years ago
- Closed: 1964; 62 years ago

Location
- Interactive map of Warrington Transporter Bridge

The Warrington Transporter Bridge (or Bank Quay Transporter Bridge) is a structural steel transporter bridge across the River Mersey in Warrington, Cheshire, England.

== Design ==
It was designed by William Henry Hunter and built by Sir William Arrol & Co. The bridge has a span of 200 ft (61 m), is 30 ft (9.1 m) wide, 76 ft (23 m) feet above high water level, with an overall length of 339 ft (103 m) feet and a total height of 89 ft (27 m).

== History ==
It was constructed in 1916–17 and fell into disuse in approximately 1964. The bridge was constructed to connect the two parts of the large chemical and soap works of Joseph Crosfield and Sons. It was originally designed to carry rail vehicles up to 18 long tons (18 tonnes) in weight, and was converted for road vehicles in 1940. In 1953, it was further modified to carry loads of up to 30 long tons (30 tonnes). It closed in 1964 after 48 years of operation.

It was the second of two transporter bridges across the Mersey at Warrington. The first was erected in 1906 and opened in 1907 slightly to the north of the existing bridge and was later transformed into a pipeline bridge, before it was demolished.

It is one of three remaining such bridges in the UK.

== Regeneration ==
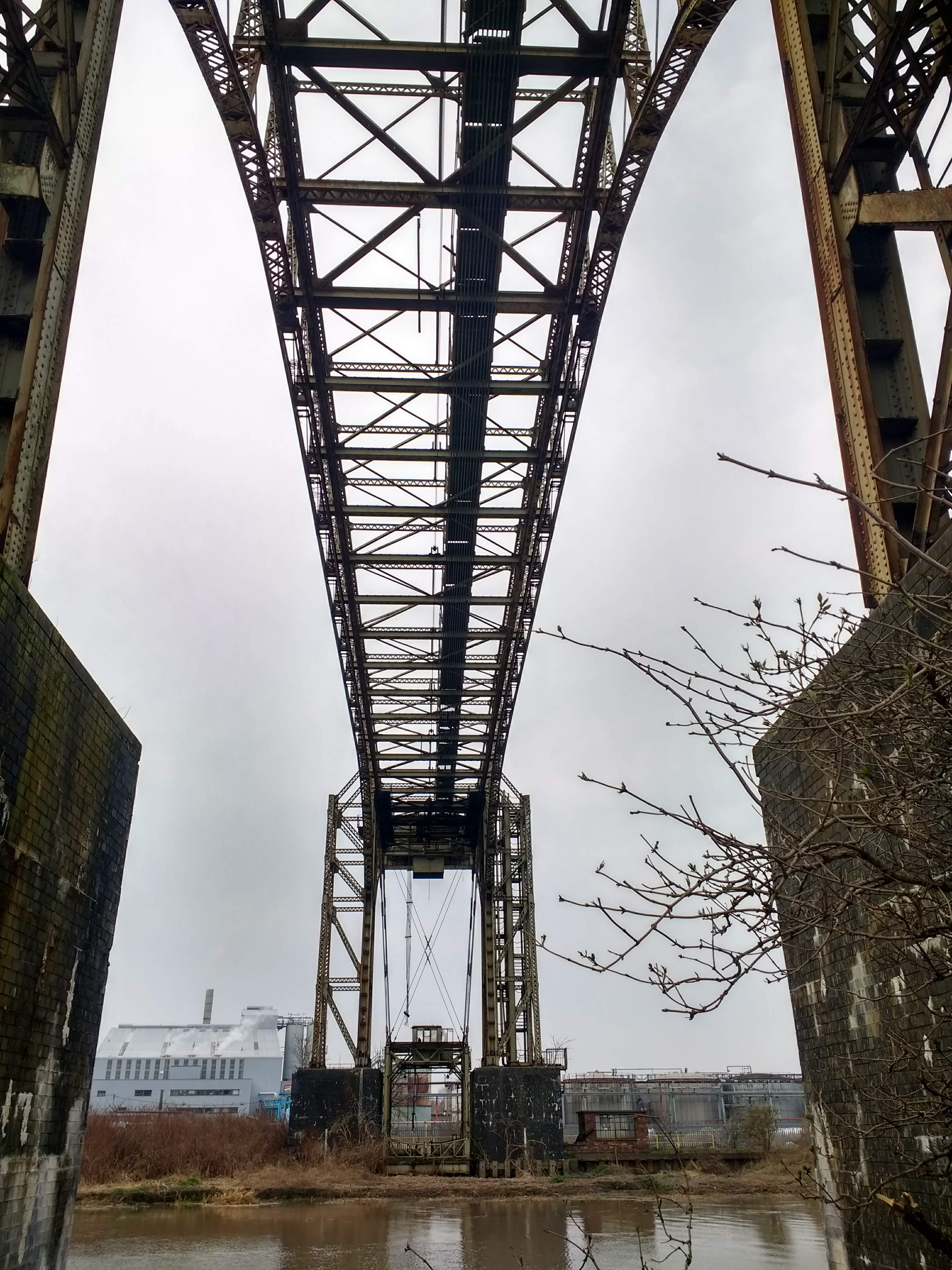
The bridge with signs of disrepair

The bridge is recorded in the National Heritage List for England as a designated Grade II* listed building, and because of its poor condition it is on the Heritage at Risk Register. The bridge is protected as a Scheduled Ancient Monument.

A local group called Friends of Warrington Transporter Bridge (FoWTB) was formed in April 2015 to act as the independent voice of the bridge. The group is liaising with other interest groups to safeguard the future of the bridge and its industrial heritage status. FoWTB has been featured on the local BBC News programme, North West Tonight and has set up a website for the bridge along with Facebook and Twitter pages. In 2016, the bridge was nominated for the Institution of Civil Engineers North West Heritage Award.

== See also ==
- Grade I and II* listed buildings in Warrington
- List of Scheduled Monuments in Cheshire (post-1539)
