= Saint Benedict (disambiguation) =

Saint Benedict generally refers to Benedict of Nursia (480–547 AD).

St Benedict, St Benedict's, or variant forms may also refer to:

== People ==
- Pope Benedict II of Rome (635–685)
- Benedict Biscop (628–690), Anglo-Saxon abbot
- Benedict (bishop of Milan) (died 732), archbishop of Milan c. 685 – 732
- Benedict of Aniane (c. 747 – 821), Benedictine monk and monastic reformer
- Benedict of Skalka or Szkalka (died 1012), Benedictine monk
- Bénézet (c. 1163 – 1184), or Benedict, the Bridge-Builder
- Benedict the Moor (1526–1589), Italian Franciscan friar in Sicily
- Benedict Joseph Labre (1748–1783), French mendicant and Franciscan tertiary

== Places ==
- St. Benedict, Saskatchewan, Canada
- St. Benedict, Iowa, U.S.
- St. Benedict, Kansas, U.S.
- Saint Benedict, Louisiana, U.S.
- St. Benedict, Minnesota, U.S.
- Saint Benedict, Oregon, U.S.
- Saint Benedict, Pennsylvania, U.S.
- San Benedicto Island, Mexico

== See also ==
- Benedict (disambiguation)
- Monastery of St. Benedict (disambiguation)
- São Bento (disambiguation)
- St Benet (disambiguation)
- Saint Benedict Abbey (disambiguation)
- St. Benedict Catholic Secondary School (disambiguation)
- St. Benedict's Church (disambiguation)
- St. Benedict's College (disambiguation)
- St Benedict's School (disambiguation)
- Order of Saint Benedict, a Roman Catholic religious order
