= St. Benedict's Church =

St. Benedict's Church or St. Benedict's Catholic Church or variations thereof may refer to:

== Australia ==
- St Benedict's Catholic Church, Chippendale, New South Wales

== Denmark ==
- St. Bendt's Church, Ringsted

== Germany ==
- St. Benedict's Church, Munich

== New Zealand ==
- St Benedict's Church, Newton

== Hong Kong ==
- St. Benedict's Church, Sha Tin

== Switzerland ==
- St Benedict's City Church, Biel
- St Benedict's Chapel, Sumvitg

== United Kingdom ==
- Church of St Benedict, Ardwick, Manchester
- Church of St Mary and St Benedict, Buckland Brewer, Devon
- St Benedict's Church, Bordesley, West Midlands
- St Benedict's Church, Glastonbury, Somerset
- St Benedict's Church, Haltham-on-Bain, Lincolnshire
- St Benedict's Church, Lincoln, Lincolnshire
- St Benedict's Church, Norwich, Norfolk
- St Benedict's Church, Paddlesworth, Kent
- St Benedict's Church, Warrington, Cheshire
- St Bene't's Church, Cambridge
- St Benet's Abbey, Norfolk

== United States ==
- St. Benedict's Church (Stamford, Connecticut)
- St. Benedict's Catholic Church (Honaunau, Hawaii), listed on the National Register of Historic Places on the island of Hawaii
- St. Benedict Cathedral (Evansville, Indiana)
- St. Benedict's Church (Bendena, Kansas)
- St. Benedict's Convent and College Historic District, St. Joseph, Minnesota
- St. Benedict's Catholic Church (Nebraska City, Nebraska)
- Saint Benedict Joseph Labre Parish, Richmond Hill, New York
- St. Benedict Catholic Church (Greensboro, North Carolina)
- Church of St. Benedict the Moor (Pittsburgh), Pennsylvania
- St. Benedict's Monastery, Colorado
- St. Benedict's Abbey (Kansas), Atchison, Kansas
- St. Benedict Abbey (Massachusetts)

== See also ==
- St. Benedict's (disambiguation)
- Church of St. Benedict the Moor (disambiguation)
