= Benedict =

Benedict may refer to:

== People ==
=== Names ===
- Benedict (given name), including a list of people with the given name
- Benedict (surname), including a list of people with the surname

=== Religious figures ===
- Pope Benedict I (died 579)
- Pope Benedict II (635–685), who was also a saint
- Pope Benedict III (died 858)
- Pope Benedict IV (died 903)
- Pope Benedict V (died 965)
- Pope Benedict VI (died 974)
- Pope Benedict VII (died 983)
- Pope Benedict VIII (died 1024)
- Pope Benedict IX (c. 1010 – c. 1056)
- Pope Benedict XI (1240–1304)
- Pope Benedict XII (c. 1280 – 1342)
- Pope Benedict XIII (1649–1730)
- Pope Benedict XIV (1675–1758)
- Pope Benedict XV (1854–1922)
- Pope Benedict XVI (1927–2022)
- Antipope Benedict X (c. 1000 – c. 1070)
- Antipope Benedict XIII (1328–1423)
- Antipope Benedict XIV, either of two closely related 15th century minor antipopes

== Places ==
- Benedict Canyon, Los Angeles, California
- Benedict (crater), a lunar crater
- Benedict Fjord, Greenland
- Benedict Glacier, Canada
- Benedict, Georgia, U.S.
- Benedict, Kansas, U.S.
- Benedict, Maryland, U.S.
- Benedict, Minnesota, U.S.
- Benedict, Nebraska, U.S.
- Benedict, North Dakota, U.S.
- Benedikt, Slovenia

== Other uses ==
- Benedict College, South Carolina, United States
- Benedict International Education Group, a Swiss-based worldwide group of 80 schools
- Benedict's reagent, a chemical reagent

== See also ==
- Saint Benedict (disambiguation)
- São Bento (disambiguation)
- St Benet (disambiguation)
- Benediction, a short invocation for divine help
- Order of Saint Benedict, a Roman Catholic religious order
- Benedictine (disambiguation)
- Eggs Benedict, a food dish
- Benedict's reagent, a test for aldehydes in chemistry
