= St Oswald's Church, Padgate =

Coordinates: 53.2408°N 2.3352°W

- St Oswald, King and Martyr
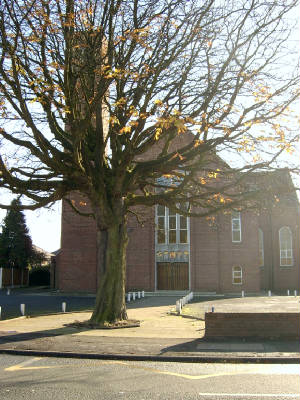
- St Oswald's from Padgate Lane

- Location in Cheshire
- OS grid reference: SJ 630 900
- Location: Warrington, Cheshire
- Country: England
- Denomination: Roman Catholic
- Website: http://stmarysandstbenedictswarrington.co.uk/

History
- Status: Parish church
- Founded: 1924
- Founder: Ampleforth Abbey
- Dedication: St Oswald

Architecture
- Functional status: Active
- Architect(s): L.A.G. Pritchard, Son & Partners, Liverpool
- Architectural type: Church
- Completed: 1965

Administration
- Diocese: Liverpool
- Deanery: St.Gregory's, Warrington

Clergy
- Priest: Fr David Heywood

St Oswald's Church is a Roman Catholic church in the Padgate suburb of Warrington, Cheshire, England. The parish was founded by Benedictine monks from Ampleforth Abbey, and it is now served by clergy from the Roman Catholic Archdiocese of Liverpool.

== History ==
The parish was established from St Mary's Church, Warrington by Fr. Thomas Austin Hind O.S.B, a Warringtonian by birth, who is credited with conceiving the idea to build the church and to have chosen the dedication to St Oswald of Northumbria. On 1 July 1924, Archbishop Keating of Liverpool give permission for the formation of this, the fourth Benedictine parish in Warrington: the others being St. Albans (1755); St.Mary's (1877) and St. Benedict's (1902). The parish was served by the clergy of St Mary's Church, Warrington until it became an independent parish on 24 July 1929.

The last Benedictine Parish Priest was Fr Harold Cyprian Broomfield O.S.B as the Abbot of Ampleforth Abbey surrendered the parish to the Archbishop of Liverpool on 10 September 1962. From 2013, following the death of Canon William Redmond, the parish was served by the parish priest of St Benedict's Church, Warrington. On 1 May 2018, St.Oswald's became part of one new combined parish called Blessed James Bell which also incorporates the former parishes of St Mary's and St Benedict's in Warrington.

== Parish Priests ==
Parish Priest	Tenure
Fr Thomas Austin Hind O.S.B	1929-1935
Fr Reginald Denis Marshall O.S.B	1935-1942
Fr Edmund Benedict Milburn O.S.B	1942-1946
Fr Norman Francis Geldert O.S.B	1946-1955
Fr Harold Cyprian Broomfield O.S.B	1955-1962
After the withdrawal of Ampleforth Abbey
Fr Denis Ryan	1962-1974
Fr Owen O'Sullivan	1974-1980
Fr James Murray	1980-1998
Fr Charles E. Canning	1998-2011
Canon William Redmond	2011-2013
Monsignor John Devine O.B.E	2013-2015
Fr David Heywood	2015-

== School and Convent ==
In 1929 the Sisters of the Cross and Passion, part of the Passionist family, moved from Buttermarket Street in Warrington to Bruche Hall close to the church. A school, with a capacity for 200 children, was opened on 1 September 1931 which was staffed by the sisters and lay teachers. In 1971, a purpose built Convent was built and the old house demolished.

== Gallery ==
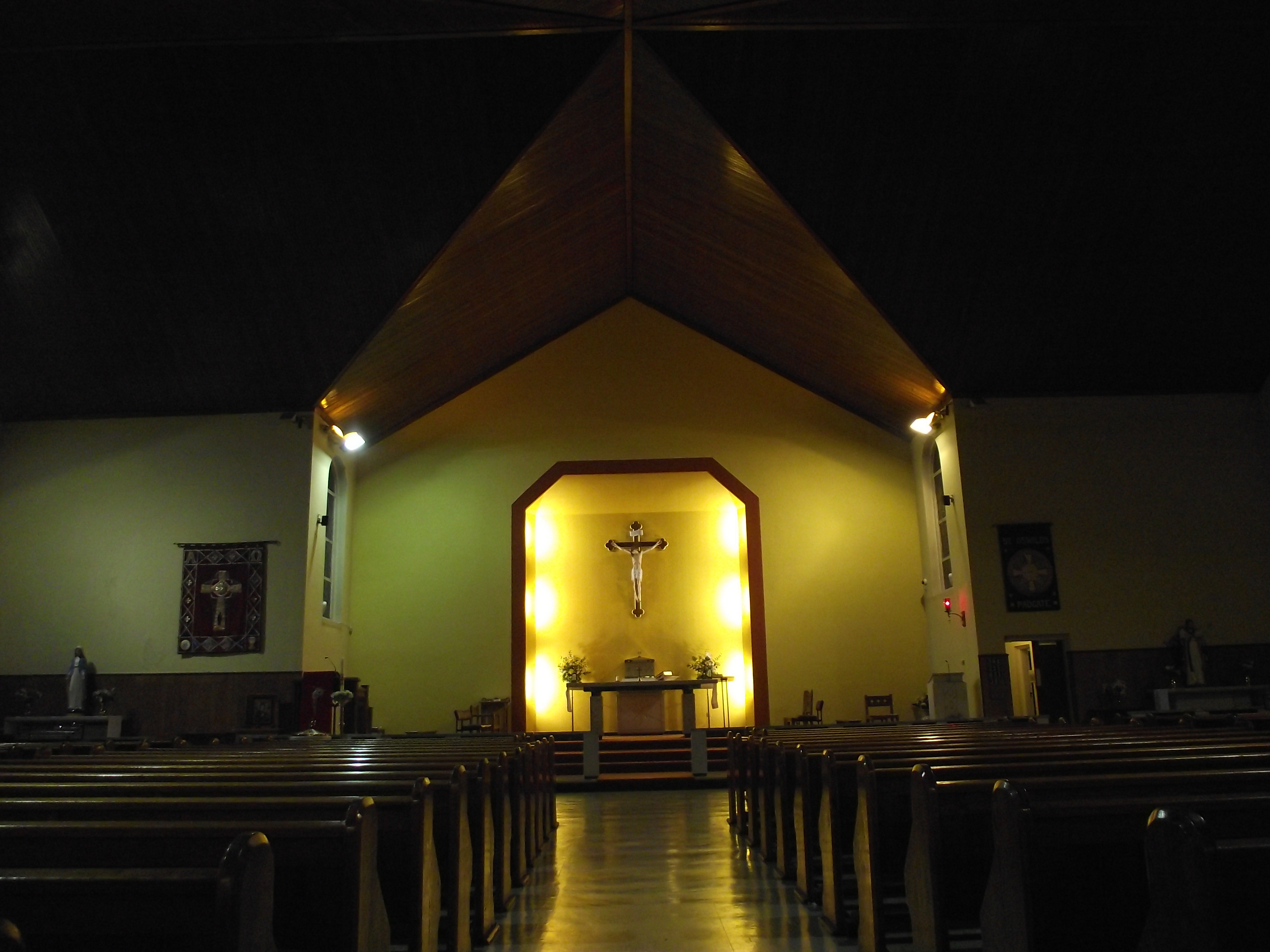
Interior view of sanctuary.

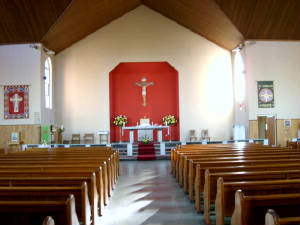
St.Oswald's, Warrington. Interior one
