= St. Benedict's =

St. Benedict's may refer to:

- St. Benedict's Church (disambiguation), several churches
- Saint Benedict's College (disambiguation), several colleges
- St Benedict's School (disambiguation), several schools
- One of several St. Benedict's Monasteries

== See also ==
- Saint Benedict Catholic Voluntary Academy
- St. Benedict Immaculate Canadian Academy
- St. Benedict, Iowa
- St. Benedict, Kansas
- St. Benedict, Saskatchewan
