= Benedikte =

Benedikte is a first name. It can refer to:

- Benedikte Naubert (1756–1819), German writer
- Princess Benedikte of Denmark (born 1944), a member of the Danish royal family
- Benedikte Hansen (born 1958), Danish actress
- Benedikte Kiær (born 1969), Danish politician

== See also ==
- Benedict (disambiguation)
