= São Bento station =

São Bento station may refer to:

- São Bento railway station, a railway station and terminal in the city of Porto, Portugal
- São Bento station (Porto Metro), an underground light rail station on the Porto Metro in the city of Porto, Portugal
- São Bento station (São Paulo Metro), an underground metro station on the Sao Paulo Metro in the city of Sao Paulo, Brazil

== See also ==
- São Bento (disambiguation)
