= John Finch (martyr) =

English Roman Catholic farmer and martyr

Blessed John Finch
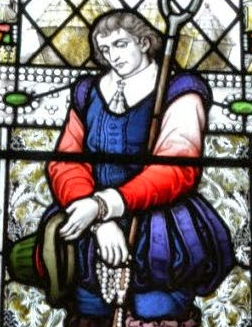
- A stained glass window in St. Mary's Catholic Church in Chorley, England

Martyr
- Born: c. 1548; Eccleston, Lancashire
- Died: 20 April 1584 (aged 35 - 36); Lancaster, England
- Venerated in: Roman Catholic Church
- Beatified: 15 December 1929, Rome by Pope Pius XI
- Feast: 20 April and 4 May (Holy English Martyrs)
- Attributes: hat, rosary, pitchfork

John Finch (b. about 1548; executed 20 April 1584) was an English Roman Catholic farmer. He is a Catholic martyr, beatified in 1929.

== Life ==
John Finch was born about 1548. He was a yeoman of Eccleston, Lancashire, from a Catholic family, but brought up an Anglican. When he was twenty years old he went to London where he spent nearly a year with some cousins at Inner Temple. While there he was struck by the contrast between Protestantism and Catholicism in practice, and determined to lead a Catholic life.

Failing to find advancement in London he returned to Lancashire where he was reconciled to the Catholic Church. He then married and settled down, his house becoming a centre of missionary work, he himself harbouring priests and aiding them in every way, besides acting as catechist. Finch made it his special care to guide priests from one Catholic house to another.

He drew on himself the hostility of the authorities, and at Christmas, 1581, he was entrapped into bringing a priest, George Ostliffe, to a place where both were apprehended. It was given out that Finch, having betrayed the priest and other Catholics, had taken refuge with the Earl of Derby, but in fact, he was kept in the earl's house as a prisoner, sometimes tortured and sometimes bribed in order to induce him to give information. He was removed to the New Fleet Prison, Manchester, and afterwards to the House of Correction. When he refused to go to the Protestant church he was dragged there by the feet, his head beating on the stones. After three years' imprisonment, he was sent to be tried at Lancaster. There he was brought to trial with three priests on 18 April 1584.

He was found guilty and, 20 April, was executed with James Bell at Lancaster.
