= Benedictine (disambiguation) =

Benedictine may mean:

- A Benedictine, a monk or nun who belongs to the Order of Saint Benedict
- Benedictine abbey
- Benedictine College in Atchison, Kansas
- Benedictine High School (disambiguation)
- Benedictine University in Lisle, Illinois
- Bénédictine, a liqueur
- Benedictine (spread), a spread/dip made with cucumbers and cream cheese
