= St Mary's Church, Warrington =

St Mary's Shrine, Warrington
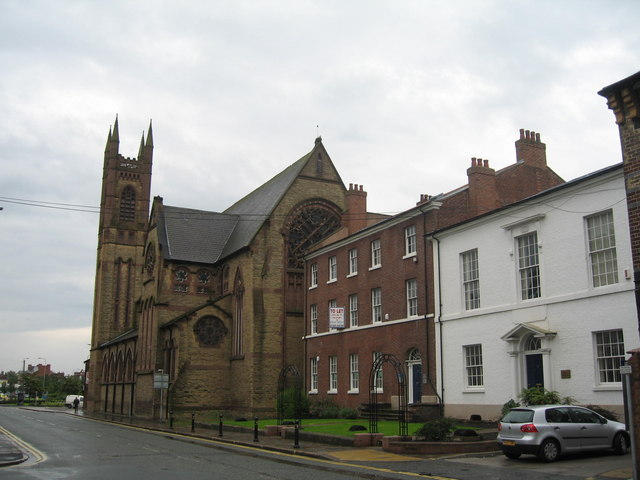
- Buttermarket Street, Warrington, with St Mary's Church
- St Mary's Shrine, Warrington
- 53.38969°N 2.58882°W
- OS grid reference: SJ 609 882
- Location: Warrington, Cheshire, England
- Country: England
- Denomination: Roman Catholic
- Website: https://fssp.org.uk/warrington/

History
- Status: Shrine

Architecture
- Functional status: Active
- Heritage designation: Grade II
- Designated: 4 April 1975
- Architect(s): E. W. Pugin, Peter Paul Pugin
- Architectural type: Church
- Style: Gothic Revival
- Groundbreaking: 1875
- Completed: 1923

Specifications
- Materials: Pale Pierpoint stone and Runcorn sandstone

Administration
- Diocese: Liverpool
- Deanery: St Gregory's, Warrington

Clergy
- Rector: Fr Matthew Goddard FSSP

St Mary's Church, or St Mary's Priory, is in the town centre of Warrington, Cheshire, England. It is recorded in the National Heritage List for England as a designated Grade II listed building, and is an active Catholic church. The parish was established and served by Benedictine monks from Ampleforth Abbey, but following the withdrawal of Ampleforth Abbey from the parish in 2012, it was served by the priest from St Benedict's Church, Warrington. From November 2015, the church has been owned and served by priests from the Priestly Fraternity of Saint Peter (FSSP) as a shrine church dedicated to the celebration of the sacraments of the pre-Vatican II form of the Roman Rite. It is well known for the beauty and reverence of its liturgy.

Since summer 2017, Sunday Sung Mass and daily Low Mass are streamed live and on-demand from St Mary's at LiveMass.net and via the iMass app.

== History ==
The parish was established from St Alban's Church, Warrington by the Benedictine priests from Ampleforth Abbey who served there. Fr. John Placid Hall OSB is credited with conceiving the idea to build the church and to have chosen the site. The site had been occupied by a cotton mill. The site was bought on 5 May 1870 for £4,000.

The church was designed by E. W. Pugin and its construction started in 1875, just before Pugin's death. The foundation stone was laid by Bishop O'Reilly of Liverpool on Sunday 9 May 1875. It was completed by Peter Paul Pugin in 1877. The architectural historian Nikolaus Pevsner considered it to be one of their best churches.

The church was opened on Thursday 30 August 1877. The splendid reredos and rose window were blessed on 1 November 1885. The very tall and slender southwest tower, a departure from the original design, was designed by Pugin & Pugin and built by Travis & Wevill of Liverpool in 1907. A northeast chapel, the First World War Memorial Chapel, designed by Frederick Walters was added in 1923.

St Mary's parish had a school and parish hall, known as Ashton Hall, both of which have been closed and demolished. From 1934 a programme of slum clearances reduced the population of the parish by half within four years.

St Oswald's Church, Padgate was established from St Mary's by Fr Thomas Austin Hind OSB in 1929, who became its first priest.

Fr. Paul William Wright OSB announced on Sunday 15 January 2012 that Ampleforth Abbey could no longer provide a priest for the parish due to a lack of manpower and that he would be the last monk-priest to serve in the parish. Thus ending a Benedictine presence in Warrington lasting 250 years. Fr. William Wright's last Mass was on Sunday 9 September 2012.

Discussions about the Priestly Fraternity of Saint Peter taking over the parish were held in 2012, but were inconclusive. The Archdiocese of Liverpool then took over the pastoral care of the people of the parish. The pastoral needs of the congregation were then met by Monsignor John Devine OBE, of St Benedict's Church, Warrington, who was later given charge of the parish of St Oswald's Church, Padgate as well.

On Saturday 4 July 2015, the Archbishop of Liverpool, Malcolm McMahon, OP announced:

"I have invited the Priestly Fraternity of Saint Peter to come to the Archdiocese and to have responsibility for St Mary’s Church, Warrington. In due course this will become a centre for the celebration of the extraordinary form of the Roman Rite and the sacraments. The priests of this fraternity will not, however, assume pastoral responsibility for St Mary’s parish, which will be the responsibility of Fr David Heywood from September."

The first public Mass by the FSSP in the church was celebrated by Fr Armand de Malleray on Sunday 15 November 2015. The formal Inaugural Mass, attended by the Archbishop of Liverpool Malcolm McMahon and Abbot Cuthbert Madden OSB of Ampleforth Abbey was held on 21 November 2015."

For the first time in many decades, priestly ordinations in the traditional rite were conducted at St Mary's on 17 June 2017. Deacons Alex Stewart and Krzysztof Sanetra FSSP were ordained to the priesthood by Archbishop McMahon.

Following the transition to the FSSP, the church is not technically a parish church, but a shrine within a parish, as the parish itself was merged with two others, St Benedict's Church, Warrington, St Oswald's Church, Padgate. In late April 2018, it was announced that the new name for the merged parish is Blessed James Bell Parish.

== Architecture ==
It is built in pale Pierpoint stone and red Runcorn sandstone. The church is in Decorated style. Its plan consists of a southwest tower, a six-bay nave with a clerestory, north and south aisles, a short chancel, and short transepts. The tower is slender and the parapet spells out "AVE MARIA". There is a west porch. To the north of the chancel is the Sacred Heart Chapel (1890) and to the south is the English Martyrs (formerly Lady) Chapel. The interior is "airy and spacious". The confessionals are integrated into the north wall. The arcade spandrels contain carvings of angels supporting busts of English saints. These are St Augustine of Canterbury, St Hilda, St Thomas of Canterbury, St Walpurga, St Bede on one side and St Gregory the Great, St Winefride, St Cuthbert, Saint Mildred and St Wilfrid on the other.

The fittings were all designed by Peter Paul Pugin and the carving was executed by Boulton of Cheltenham. The High Altar (1885) and the chapel altars are in Portland and Bath stone. The pulpit (1884) and communion rail are in marble, and the choir stalls (1891) in oak. The pews are benches with cast iron frames. The Stations of the Cross (1894) are recessed, and are in Caen stone. The sculptures are of St Benedict and St Scholastica (1891) against the chancel arch, of Our Lady of Lourdes by Philip Lindsey Clark, and in the north aisle, of Saint Joseph designed by Geoffrey Webb and sculpted by Harold Youngman, in the north transept. On the South wall is a reliquary which contains relics of Dominic Barberi and was installed in 1965. In the chancel are Minton tiles with a lily design by C. W. Pugin. Above the reredos is a rose window. The reredos is of great quality and features the adoration of the kings and the adoration of the shepherds, as well as flowers and symbols that maintain the marian theme. It is topped by four statues of saints renowned for their devotion to Mary: St Anselm, St Bernard of Clairvaux, St Dominic and St Alphonsus Liguori.

Within the church there are a number of stained glass windows by Hardman & Co. and also Harry Clarke featuring a number of saints including Warrington's own martyr Blessed James Bell (priest).

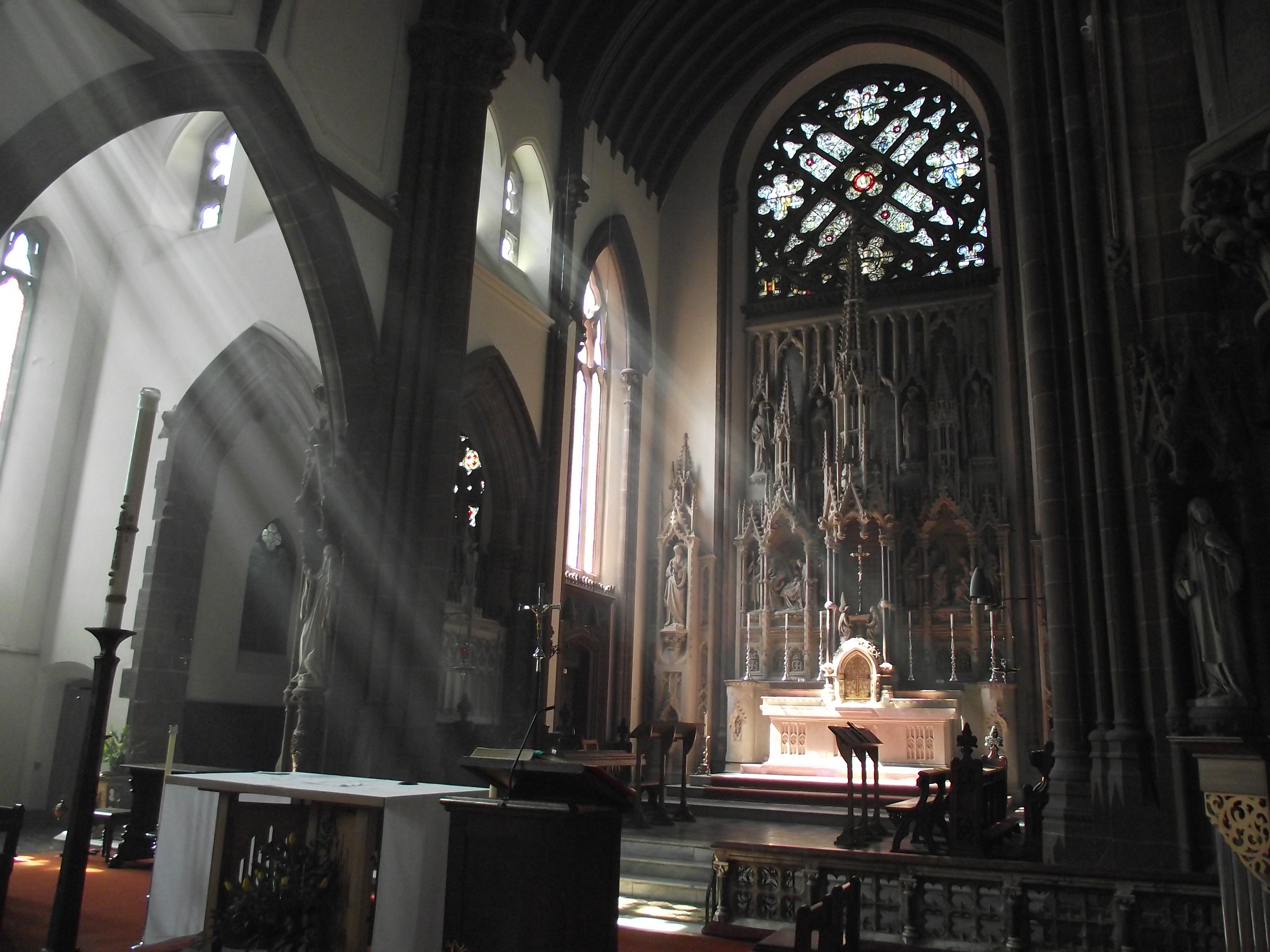
Chancel towards the South

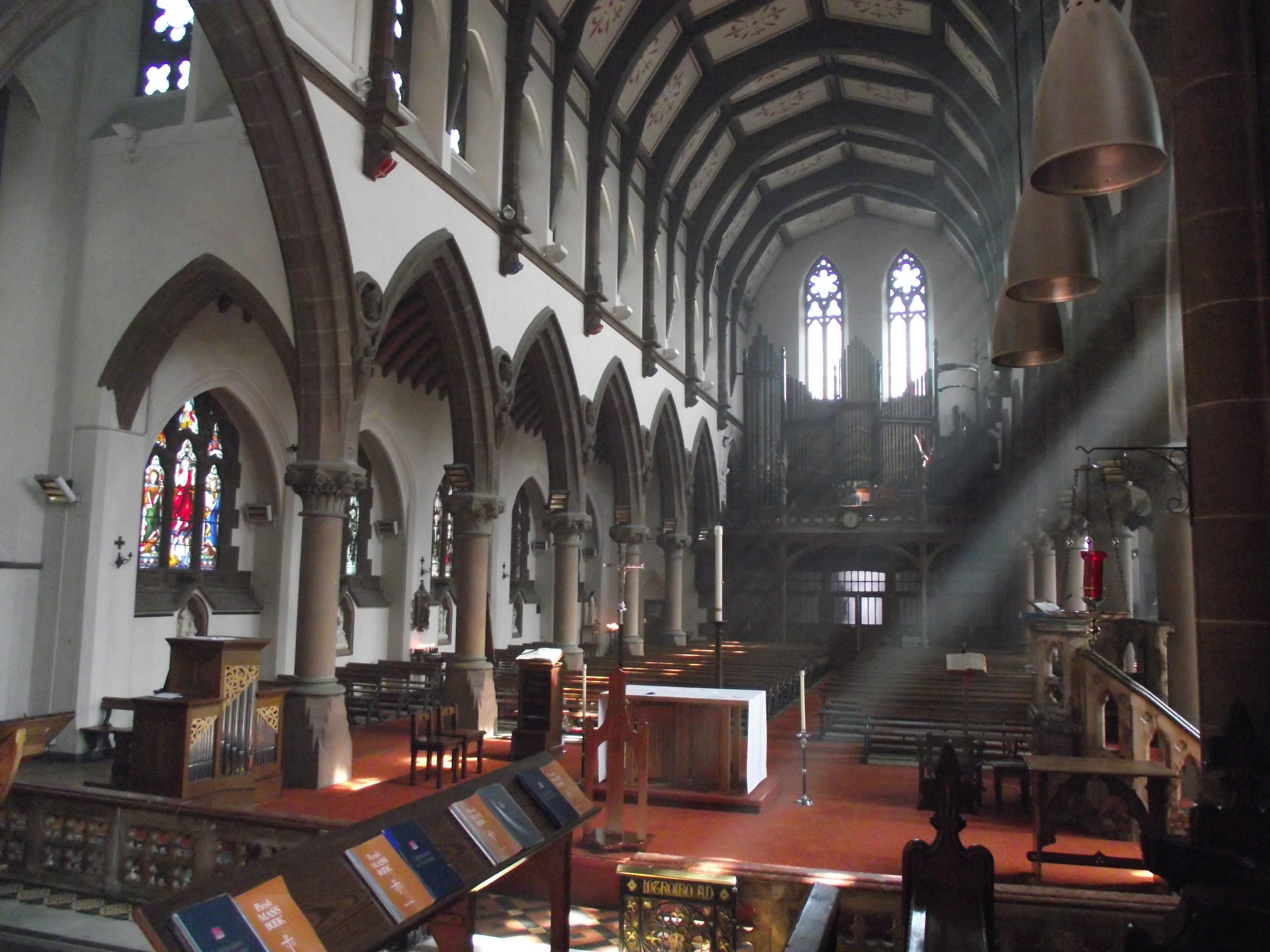
Nave looking towards the narthex

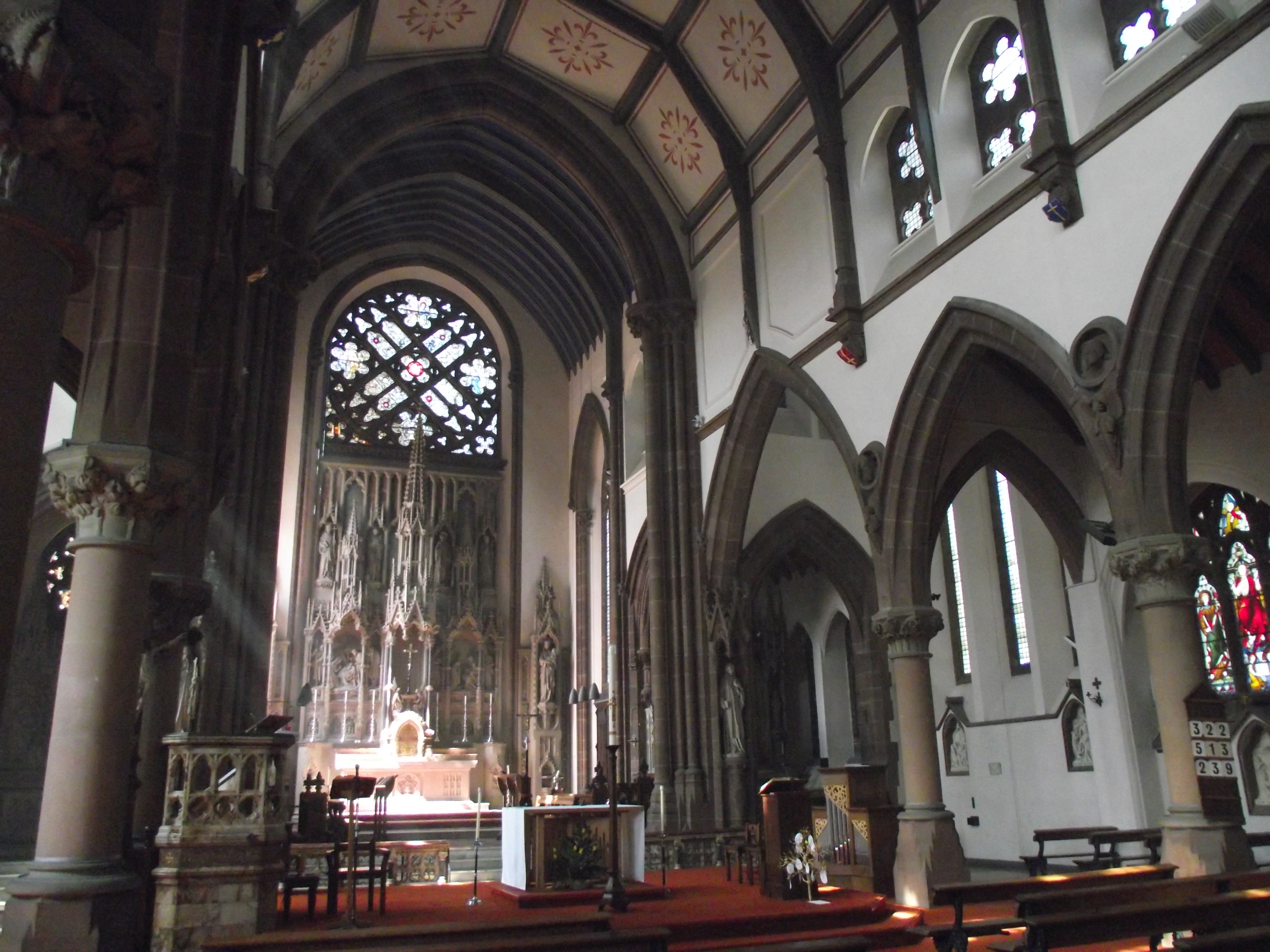
The Chancel towards the North

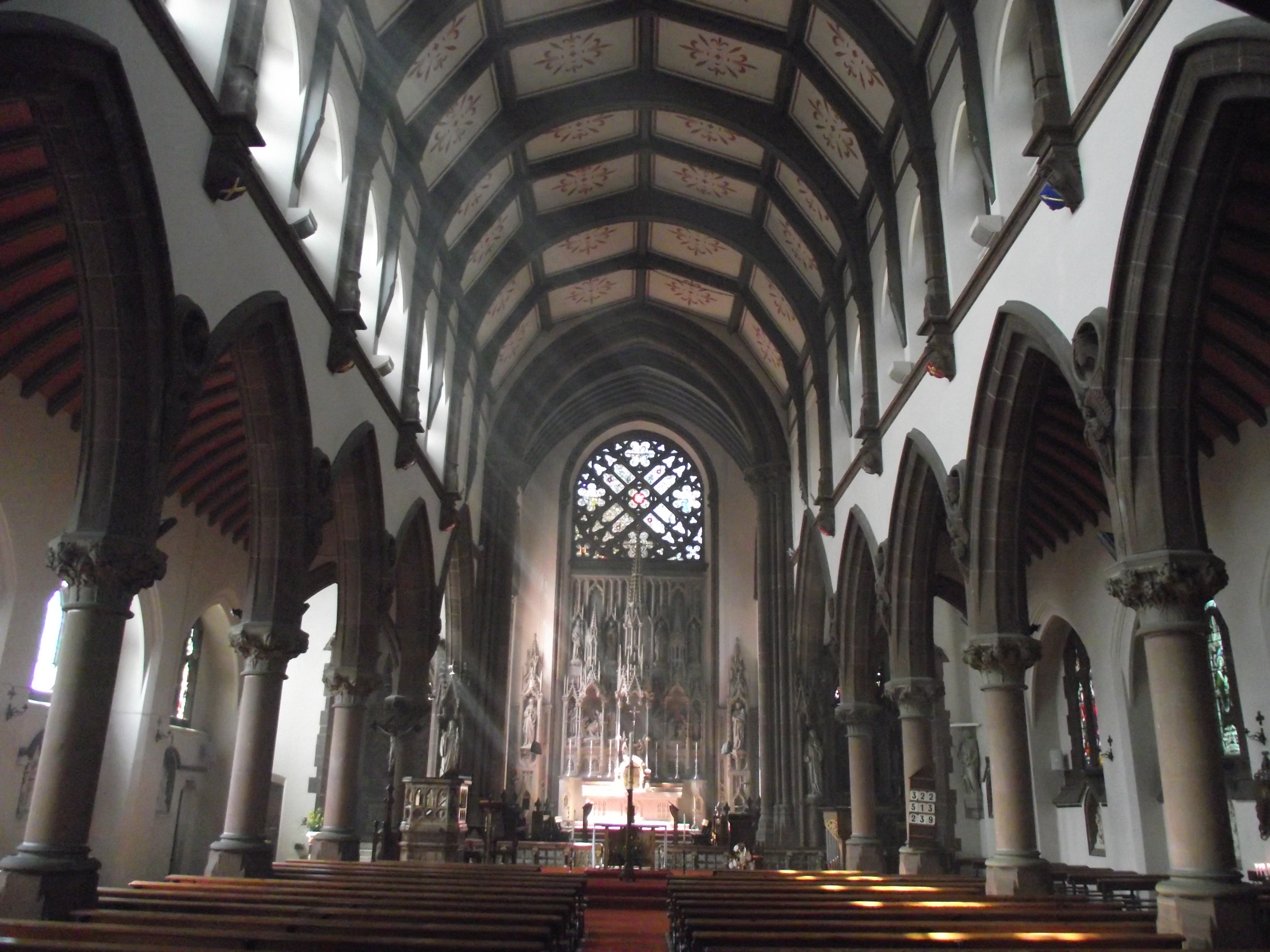
The Nave

== St Mary's Parish Priests ==
Parish Priest	Tenure
Fr Thomas Austin Bury OSB	1877–1882
Fr Austin Bernard Pozzi OSB	1882–1883
Fr Francis Wilfrid Sumner OSB	1883–1897
Fr Neville Vincent Wilson OSB	1897–1915
Fr Thomas Austin Hind OSB	1915–1927
Fr Herman Alexius Chamberlain OSB	1929–1942
Fr Douglas Martin Rochford OSB	1942–1953
Fr Austin Michael Sandeman OSB	1953–1962
Fr Peter Gabriel Gilbey OSB Baron Vaux of Harrowden	1962–1976
Fr Francis Christopher Topping OSB	1976–1986
Fr Anthony Augustine Measures OSB	1986–1997
Fr John Felix Stephens OSB	1997–2007
Fr Paul William Wright OSB	2007–2012
After the withdrawal of Ampleforth Abbey	
Monsignor John Devine OBE	2012–2015
In 2015 St Mary's was removed from parish use and transferred to the FSSP as a shrine	

== St Mary's Shrine FSSP Rectors ==
Rector	Tenure
Fr Armand de Malleray FSSP	2015–2023
Fr Matthew Goddard FSSP	2023–present

Former FSSP Assistant Priests include Fr James Mawdsley (2016–2017), Fr Seth Phipps (2018) and Fr Konrad Loewenstein (2017–2019).

== Sacred music ==
The musical tradition of the universal Church is a treasure of inestimable value, greater even than that of any other art. The main reason for this pre-eminence is that, as sacred song united to the words, it forms a necessary or integral part of the solemn liturgy. Holy Scripture, indeed, has bestowed praise upon sacred song, and the same may be said of the fathers of the Church and of the Roman pontiffs who in recent times, led by St. Pius X, have explained more precisely the ministerial function supplied by sacred music in the service of the Lord. (#112) Sacrosanctum Concilium.

Since its foundation in 1877, St. Mary’s choir occupied a unique and enviable position as a leading exponent in Sacred Music. At the Pontifical High Mass for the opening of the Church, records show that a vast choir and orchestra sung Haydn’s Nelson Mass, and music by Mozart, Beethoven and Rossini. Fr. J E Turner OSB was curate at St. Mary’s from 1891-93. A gifted organist, singer and composer, he composed 4 Masses and numerous motets, which are still in print today. His Mass in honour of St. Cecilia was premiered at St. Mary’s at High Mass on Sunday 28 August 1892.

Unlike many Churches at this time, St. Mary’s maintained a tradition of performing Plainchant and Renaissance polyphony. Fr. Turner, along with Sir Richard Terry, Organist at Westminster Cathedral, was instrumental in the revival of the traditional chants of the church, as well as polyphonic masters such as Palestrina, Byrd and Lassus.

On Sunday 4 August 1935, the first religious broadcast from Warrington on the B.B.C. was broadcast from St. Mary’s. Since then, St. Mary’s has broadcast several times, and also made the first televised religious service on Granada television in December 1974.

At the time of the Diamond Jubilee, the choir boasted 22 boy trebles, and 18 men, directed by Mr Aaron Kilburn.

Until recently St Mary's was recognised as having one of the leading church choirs in the North West. The Church was fortunate to have boy and girl choristers, an adult Schola, and was home to Warrington Choral Society, and was proud to continue this ancient tradition that is part of our nation's cultural heritage. The choirs sang frequently throughout the Archdiocese, and regularly sang at Liverpool Metropolitan Cathedral, and St Chad's Cathedral in Birmingham. Several former choristers have gone on to pursue organ studies at The Royal Academy of Music, The Royal College of Music, and careers at St George's Chapel, Windsor Castle.

On Sunday 4 November 2018 it was announced that, as of 26 October, the Director of Music was to stand down, due to redundancy, and the post could be fulfilled by a volunteer. The following week, it was announced that Fr Ian Verrier FSSP would be the new organist and choirmaster. As a result of this, most of the Shrine choir resigned, the boy and girl choristers were abandoned, and the Choral Society ceased to exist.

Fr Verrier read Music at The University of Birmingham and pursued postgraduate studies at the Royal Northern College of Music (RNCM) and Manchester Metropolitan University.

Directors of Music	From	To
Thomas Mather	1877	1903
John Eckersley	1903	1919
J W Broadbent	1919	1919
Frank Ball	1919	1939
Aaron Kilburn	1939	?
Harry Dilworth	1939	1970
Norman Turner	1970	1990
Howard Barlow	1990	1999
Peter Kwater	1999	2000
John Ward	2000	2001
Sam Austin	2001	2003
Michael Wynne	2003	2018

Organists and Choirmasters	From	To
Ian Verrier	2018	present

== Bells ==
The church possesses a chime of eight bells that were cast by Gillett & Johnston, Croydon, in 1906. The bells were baptised on 7 October 1906 by Abbot Smith of Ampleforth. They were totally restored in 1962 by the Whitechapel Bell Foundry, with further work done in 2005. The tenor bell is hung for ringing.

Bell	Diameter	Strike Note	Name
Tenor	3 feet 5 inches (1.04 m)	391 c.p.s	St Mary
7th	3 feet 1.5 inches (0.953 m)	440 c.p.s	St Benedict
6th	2 feet 11 inches (0.89 m)	489 c.p.s	St Wilfrid
5th	2 feet 9 inches (0.84 m)	521 c.p.s	St Patrick
4th	2 feet 6.75 inches (0.7811 m)	586 c.p.s	St Richard
3rd	2 feet 4.5 inches (0.724 m)	656 c.p.s	St Anne
2nd	2 feet 2.75 inches (0.6795 m)	742 c.p.s	St John
Treble	2 feet 1.75 inches (0.6541 m)	790 c.p.s	St Helen

== See also ==
- Listed buildings in Warrington (unparished area)
