= Church of St. Benedict the Moor =

Church of St. Benedict the Moor may refer to:

- St. Benedict the Moor Catholic Church (Pittsburgh), Pennsylvania, United States
- St. Benedict the Moor Church (New York City)
