= Seminary priest =

Seminary priests were Catholic priests trained in English seminaries or houses of study on the European continent after the introduction of laws forbidding Catholicism in Britain. Such seminaries included that at Douay, from 1568, and others at Rome from 1579, Valladolid from 1589, Seville from 1592, St Omer (later at Bruges and Liège) from 1593, and Lisbon from 1628. The English College at Douai was transferred to Rheims during the years 1578–1593.

The term "seminary priest" distinguishes these men especially from those trained at an earlier period in England. In particular, those ordained in the time of Queen Mary I are often called "Marian Priests". These latter priests and others ordained at a still earlier period were not "seminary priests" in any sense because in the Catholic Church of their day the system of training priests in seminaries had not yet been introduced. The institution of seminaries followed the Council of Trent. The first of the seminary priests to die for his faith was Cuthbert Mayne and for this he is sometimes referred to by the title of "protomartyr of the seminary priests".

== See also ==
- Colleges of St Omer, Bruges and Liège
- English College, Douai, France
- English College, Rome, Rome
- English College, Valladolid, Spain
- Pontifical English College, Lisbon, Portugal
