= São Bento =

São Bento (Portuguese for Saint Benedict) may refer to:

== Places ==
=== Brazil ===
- Colégio de São Bento, Rio de Janeiro, a school in Rio de Janeiro
- School of Philosophy of São Bento, São Paulo
- Mosteiro de São Bento (São Paulo), a monastery in the center of São Paulo
  - São Bento (São Paulo Metro), a railway station near the monastery
- Pinhal de São Bento, Paraná
- São Bento, Maranhão, Maranhão
- São Bento, Paraíba, Paraíba
- São Bento Abade, Minas Gerais
- São Bento do Norte, Rio Grande do Norte
- São Bento do Sapucaí, São Paulo
- São Bento do Sul, Santa Catarina
- São Bento do Tocantins, Tocantins
- São Bento do Trairi, Rio Grande do Norte
- São Bento do Una, Pernambuco
- Serra de São Bento, Rio Grande do Norte

=== Portugal ===
- São Bento (Porto de Mós), a parish in the municipality of Porto de Mós
- São Bento (Angra do Heroísmo), a parish in the municipality of Angra do Heroísmo, Azores
- São Bento Palace, in Lisbon, residence of the Portuguese prime minister
- São Bento railway station, in Porto

== Sports ==
- Associação Atlética São Bento, a defunct Brazilian football club
- Esporte Clube São Bento, a Brazilian football club

== Other ==
- São Bento (carrack), Portuguese ship wrecked off the Mbhashe River mouth, South Africa in 1554

== See also ==
- Saint Benedict (disambiguation)
- São Bento station (disambiguation)
- St Benet (disambiguation)
