= Marian Priests =

Category of 16th-century English Catholic priests

Marian Priests is a term is applied to those English Roman Catholic priests who were ordained in or before the reign of the Catholic Queen Mary (1553–1558) and who survived into the reign of her Anglican successor, Queen Elizabeth I. The expression is used in contradistinction to "Seminary priests", by which was meant priests ordained at Douai in northern France, at Rome or in other English seminaries on the European mainland.

== History ==
Shortly after Queen Elizabeth I's accession, Roman Catholic ordinations ceased altogether in England, in consequence of the imprisonment of the church's surviving bishops, and unless the Seminary priests had begun to land in England to take the place of the older priests who were dying, the Roman Catholic priesthood would have become extinct in England. There was an important distinction between the Marian priests and the Seminary priests in the fact that the penal legislation of the rigorous Jesuits, etc. Act 1584 only applied to the latter who were forbidden to come into or remain in the realm under pain of high treason. Therefore, the Marian priests only came under the earlier statutes, e.g. the Act of Supremacy 1558 which inflicted penalties on all who maintained the spiritual or ecclesiastical authority of any foreign prelate, or 5 Eliz. 1. c. 1 which made it high treason to maintain the authority of the Bishop of Rome (i.e. the Pope), or to refuse the Oath of Supremacy.

Dom Norbert Birt has shown that the number of Marian priests who were driven from their livings was far greater than was commonly supposed. After a careful study of all available sources of information he estimates the number of priests holding livings in England at Elizabeth's accession at 7,500 (p. 162). A large number, forming the majority of these, accepted, though unwillingly, the new state of things, and according to tradition many of them were in the habit of celebrating Mass early and of reading the Church of England service later on Sunday morning. But the number of Marian priests who refused to conform was very large, and the frequently repeated statement that only two hundred of them refused the Oath of Supremacy has been shown to be misleading, as this figure was given originally in Sander's list, which only included dignitaries and was not exhaustive. More than half of the Marian clergy resigned or were deprived at the beginning of Elizabeth's reign. Dom Norbert Birt has collected instances of nearly two thousand priests who were deprived or who abandoned their livings for conscience' sake.

As years went on, death thinned the ranks of these faithful priests, but as late as 1596 there were nearly fifty of them still working on the English mission. Owing to their more favourable legal position they escaped the persecution endured by the Seminary priests, and only the Venerable James Bell is known to have suffered martyrdom.
