= Frederick Charles Shrady =

American artist

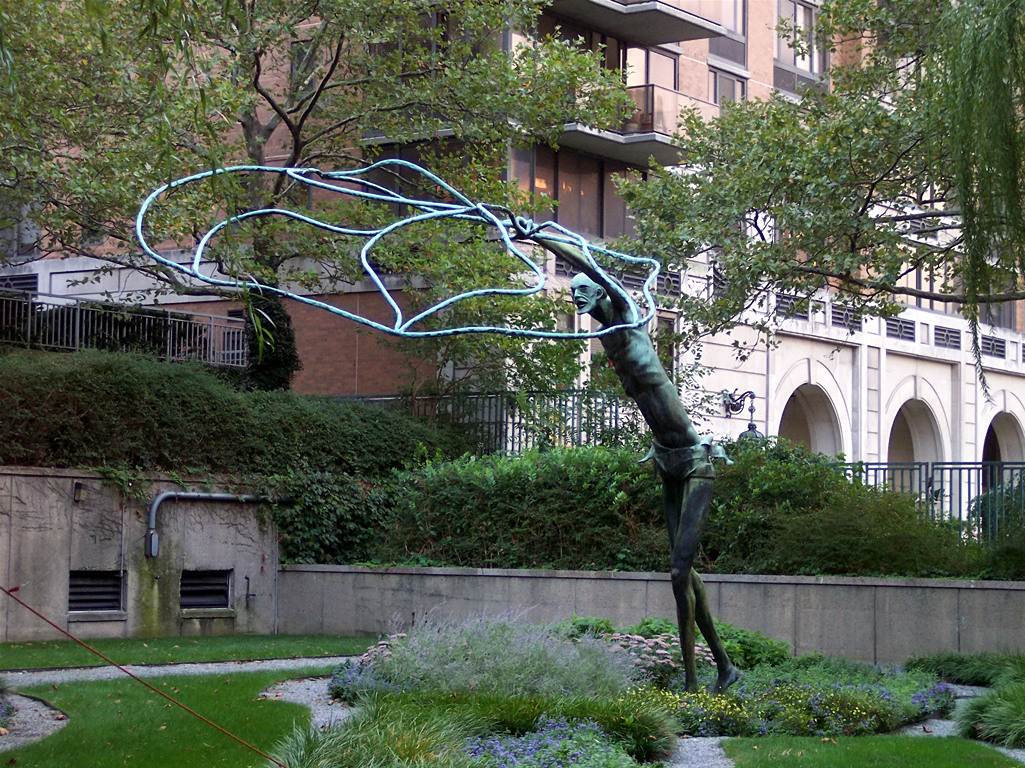
Peter, Fisher of Men (1965) Fordham University - Lincoln Center, New York City.

Frederick Charles Shrady (October 22, 1907, East View, New York — January 20, 1990, Easton, Connecticut) was an American painter and sculptor, best known for his religious sculptures.

== Biography ==
The son of the sculptor Henry Merwin Shrady, he graduated from the Choate School in Connecticut, studied painting at the Art Students' League in New York City, and attended Oxford University in England. He moved to Paris, France, in 1931, studied under Yasushi Tanaka, and lived and painted there for nine years. He was awarded a medal at the 1937 Paris Exposition.

He married in Europe, and returned to the United States in 1940, with his wife and young son, Henry.

He joined the U.S. Army during World War II, and served as one of the Monuments Men, helping to retrieve looted art. In Bavaria, he met Maria Louise Likar-Waltersdorff (1924-2002), an Austrian translator with the U.S. Army Fine Arts and Monuments Department, who became his second wife. They had six children.

He converted from Episcopalianism to Roman Catholicism in 1948, and turned to painting religious subjects. In 1950, he completed his first sculpture.

Clare Boothe Luce's 19-year-old daughter, Ann Clare Brokaw, a student at Stanford University, was killed in a 1944 automobile accident. In her memory, Luce built Saint Ann's Chapel near the campus in Palo Alto, California, and commissioned works of art to adorn it. Shrady's colossal bronze sculpture on the building's facade, Saint Ann and the Virgin Mary, portrays the mother (St. Ann) teaching her young daughter (the Virgin Mary) how to read.

He was commissioned by the Dominican Order in the Holy Land to model twelve bas-relief panels depicting The Life of Mary for the doors of the Basilica of the Annunciation in Nazareth, Israel.

In 1982, Pope John Paul II commissioned him to create a statue of Our Lady of Fatima for the Vatican Gardens. He was the first American artist to receive such a papal commission.

He was awarded the Legion of Honor by the French government, and was made a Knight Equestrian by the Order of the Holy Sepulchre in Jerusalem.

Maria Shrady wrote a number of religious books, including a children's book about Mother Teresa with illustrations by her husband.

Shrady's papers are at Georgetown University.

== Selected works ==
=== Paintings ===
- Descent from the Cross (1945), St. Stephen's Cathedral, Vienna, Austria.
- Twelve Stations of the Cross (ca. 1952), Dahlgren Chapel, Georgetown University, Washington, D.C.

=== Sculptures ===
- Bust of the Very Reverend Martin C. D'Arcy, S.J. (1953), Metropolitan Museum of Art, New York City.
- Saint Ann and the Virgin Mary (ca. 1954), Saint Ann Chapel, Stanford University, Palo Alto, California.
- Father Godfrey Schilling (1955), Mount St. Sepulchre Franciscan Monastery, Washington, D.C.
- Our Lady of Wisdom (1956), St. Bonaventure University, Allegany, New York.
- Crucifix (1959), over main entrance to All Saints Catholic School, Norwalk, Connecticut.
- Joan of Arc (ca. 1962), Cathedral of Saint Paul, Pittsburgh, Pennsylvania.
- The Prodigal Son (ca. 1962), statuette.
- Crucifix, The Virgin Mary, Saint Joseph (1963), O'Byrne Chapel, Manhattanville College, Purchase, New York. Crucifix is 9-feet tall.
- Lazarus (1963), Resurrection Cemetery, Pittsburgh, Pennsylvania. 9-feet tall.
- John the Baptist (1965), Church of the Holy Family, New York City. A replica was owned by Pope Paul VI.
- Peter, Fisher of Men (1965), Saint Peter's Garden, Fordham University - Lincoln Center, New York City. 28-feet tall.
- Triad — The Holy Family (before 1967), General Electric Headquarters, Fairfield, Connecticut. 6-feet tall.
- Saint James (before 1967), Wethersfield, Connecticut. 10-feet tall.
- Bust of Adlai Stevenson II (1967), Steele Hall, Choate School, Wallingford, Connecticut.
- The Life of Mary (1967), 12 bas-relief panels for the bronze doors of the Basilica of the Annunciation, Nazareth, Israel.
- Saint Benedict the Moor (1968), atop tower of Saint Benedict the Moor Church, Pittsburgh, Pennsylvania. 18-feet tall.
- Saint Joseph (1970), Courtyard of the Cathedral of Saint Joseph (Wheeling, West Virginia). Originally located on the grounds of St. Joseph Preparatory Seminary, Vienna, West Virginia.
- Flame (1973), Hirshhorn Museum and Sculpture Garden, Washington, D.C.
- Medallion: Courage and Hope, (reverse) Bird in Flight (1975), The Society of Medalists.
- Mother Elizabeth Ann Seton (1975), Saint Patrick's Cathedral, New York City.
- Fidelity, Bravery, Integrity — FBI Memorial (1979), J. Edgar Hoover Building, Washington, D.C. 15-feet tall.
- Torso (before 1980), Annmarie Garden, Solomons, Maryland. On loan from the Hirshhorn Museum and Sculpture Garden.
- Our Lady of Fatima (1982–83), Vatican Gardens, Vatican City.
- Saint Francis Feeding the Birds (1983), formerly in front of Egan Chapel, it now stands in-between the DiMenna-Nyselius Library, and the Marion Peckham Egan School of Nursing & Health Studies, Fairfield University, Fairfield, Connecticut.
- Human Rights (1985), United States Mission to the United Nations, New York City. 18-feet tall.
- Saint Jude Thaddeus (1990), Saint Jude Church, Monroe, Connecticut.

== Gallery ==
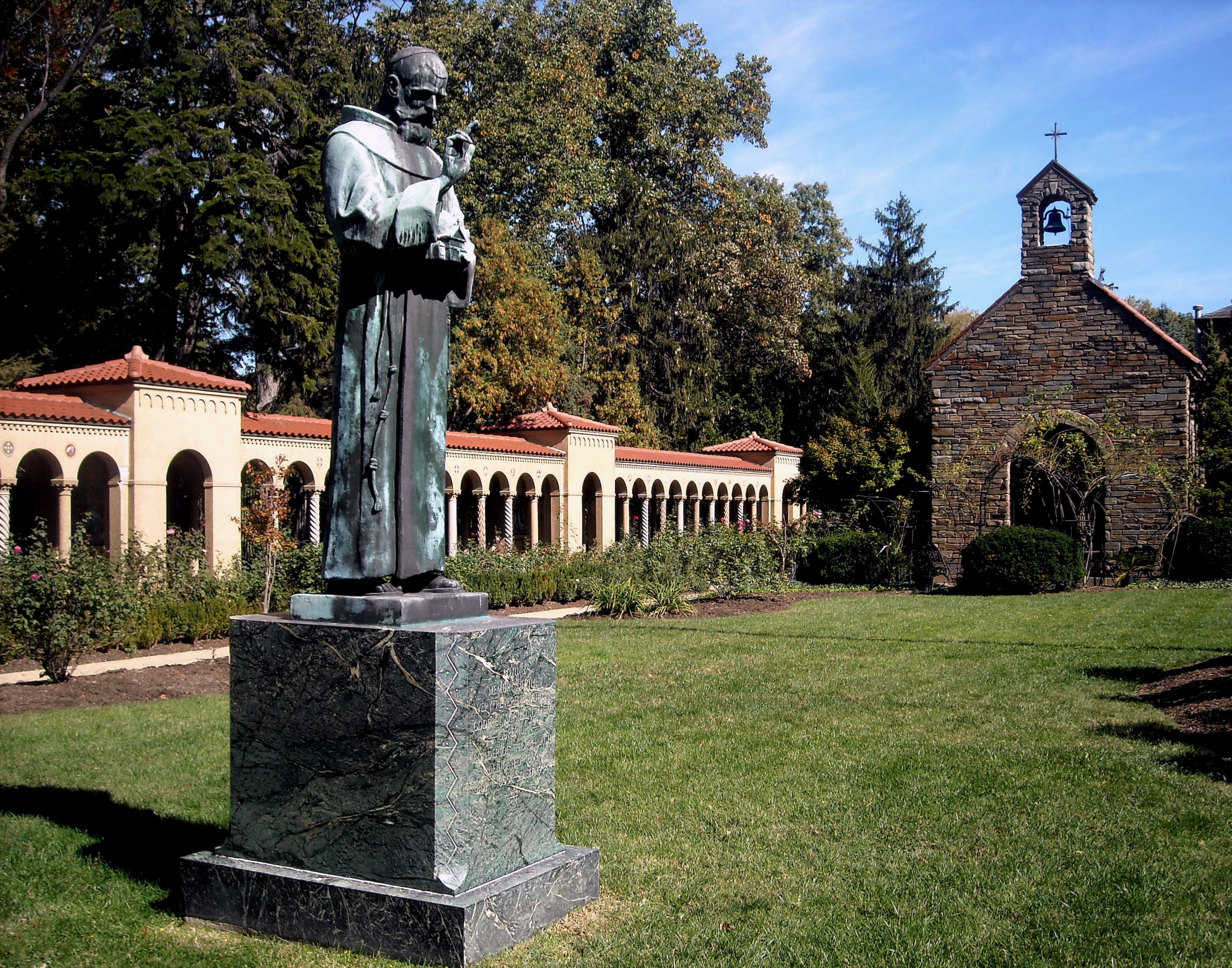
Father Godfrey Schilling (1955), Mount St. Sepulchre Franciscan Monastery, Washington, D.C.

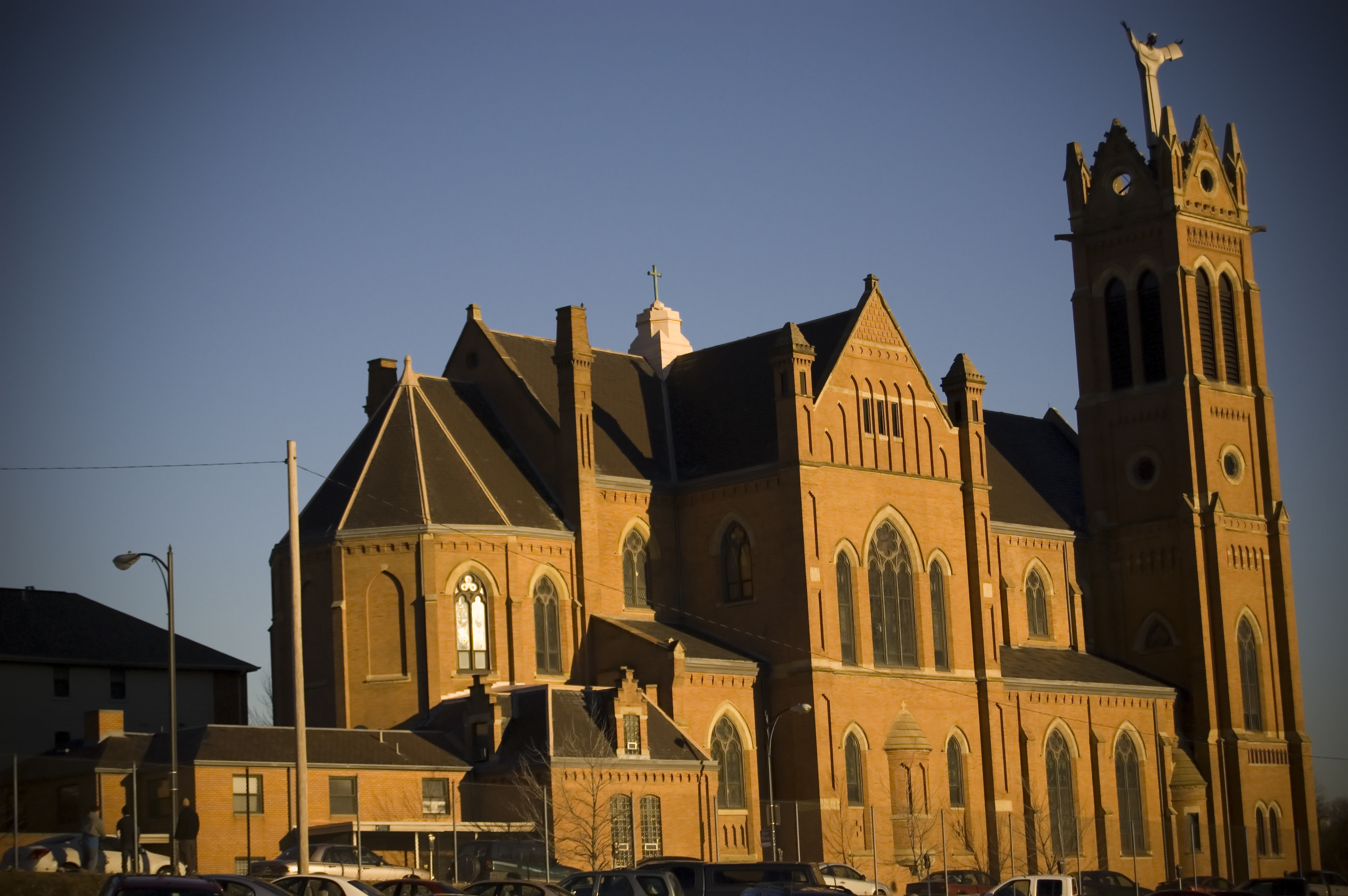
Saint Benedict the Moor (1968), atop tower of Saint Benedict the Moor Church, Pittsburgh, Pennsylvania.

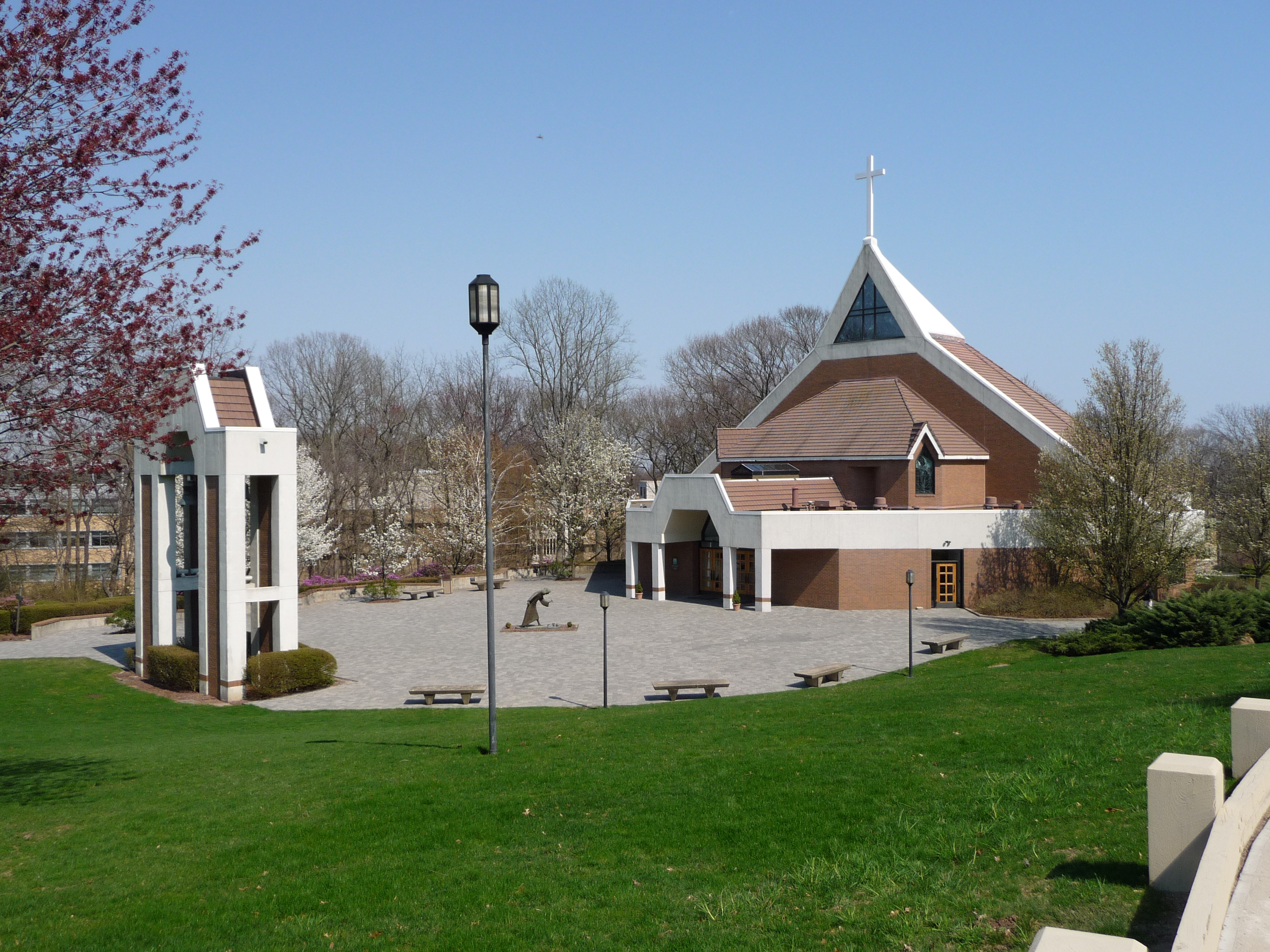
Saint Francis Feeding the Birds (1983), in front of Egan Chapel, Fairfield University, Fairfield, Connecticut.
