= Saint Benedict Abbey =

Saint Benedict Abbey may refer to:

- Saint Benedict Abbey, Quebec, Canada
- St. Benedict's Abbey (Kansas), U.S.
- St. Benedict Abbey (Massachusetts), U.S.
- Abbaye Saint-Benoît de Koubri, Burkina Faso
- Benedictine Abbey of Pietersburg, Limpopo, South Africa
- Abadía de San Benito, Luján, Buenos Aires Province, Argentina

== See also ==
- Fleury Abbey, in Saint-Benoît-sur-Loire, Loiret, France
