= Benedict, Georgia =

Unincorporated community in Georgia, U.S.

Coordinates: 33°58′26″N 85°15′26″W

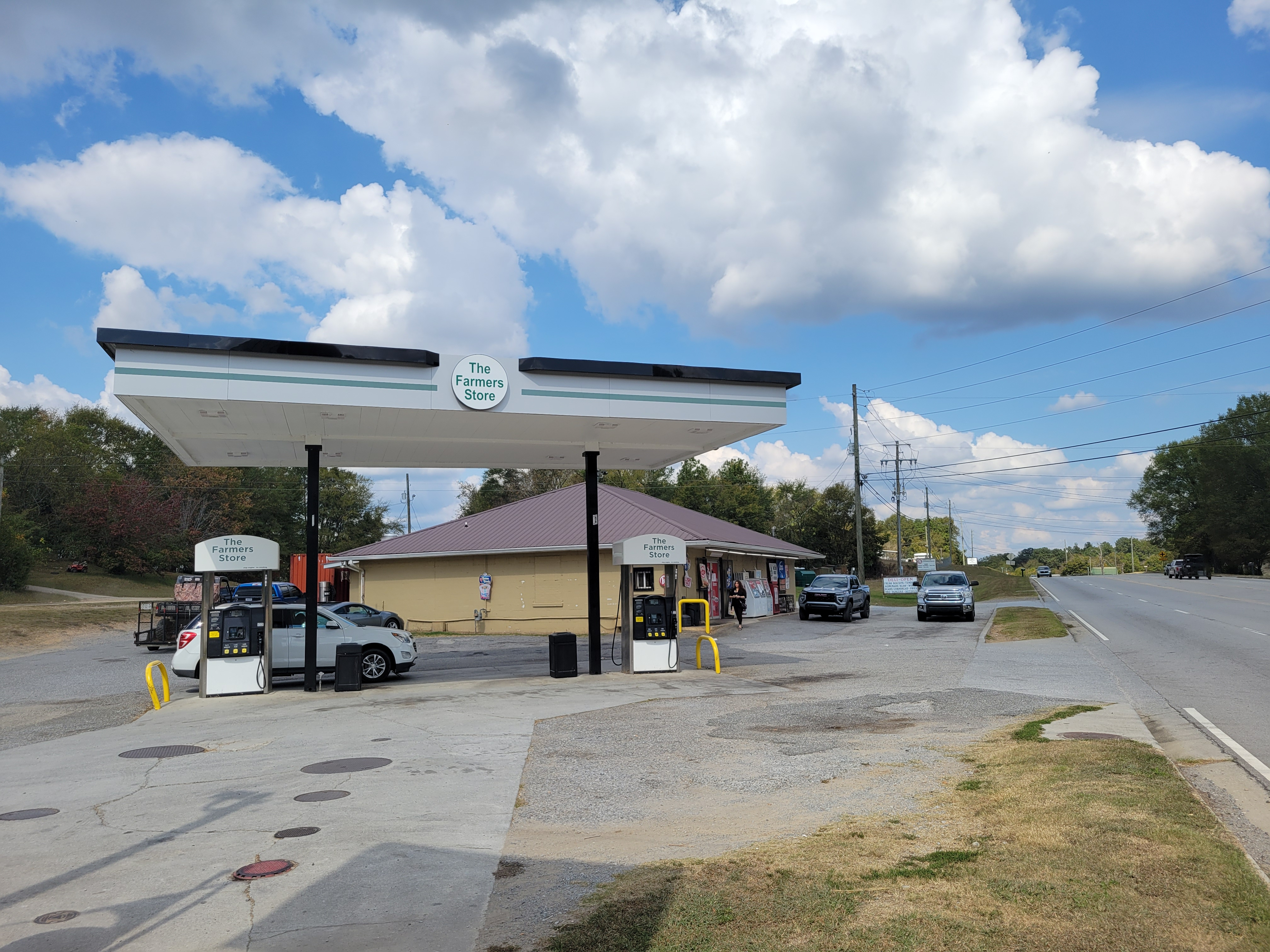
The Farmers Store

Benedict is an unincorporated community in Polk County, in the U.S. state of Georgia.

== History ==
This unincorporated community was named for George Elliot Benedict, a local Episcopal priest.
