= Benedictine High School =

Benedictine High School may refer to:

- Benedictine High School (Ohio), Cleveland, Ohio, US
- Benedictine High School (Detroit, Michigan), former high school in Detroit, Michigan
- Benedictine College Preparatory, Richmond, Virginia, US; known as Benedictine High School until 2011
- Benedictine Academy, Elizabeth, New Jersey, US
- Benedictine Military School, Savannah, Georgia, US
- Benedictine School, Ridgely, Maryland, US
- Mount Michael Benedictine High School, Elkhorn, Nebraska, US
