= Benedict Glacier =

Glacier in Canada

Benedict Glacier (79°25′N 78°35′W) is a glacier on central Ellesmere Island, Nunavut, Canada.

Geologist William Herbert Hobbs wrote in 1911 the Benedict Glacier provided an "excellent" example of a "lateral glacial stream flowing between ice and rock".
