= St Benedict's School =

St Benedict's School may refer to:

- St Benedict's School, Ealing, an independent school in Ealing, London, England
- St Benedict's Catholic High School, Alcester, a secondary school in Alcester, Warwickshire, England
- St Benedict's Catholic High School, Hensingham, a secondary school in Hensingham, Cumbria, England
- St. Benedict's Catholic School, a National Registered Historic Place in Roundup, Montana, United States
- St. Benedict Preparatory School, a private school in Chicago, Illinois, United States
- St. Benedict's Preparatory School, an all-boys Roman Catholic high school in New Jersey, United States
- St Benedict's RC High School a secondary school in Linwood, Scotland
- St Benedict's Catholic School a secondary school in Bury St Edmunds, Suffolk, England

== See also ==
- St Benedict's (disambiguation)
- St Benedict's College (disambiguation)
