= James Bell (priest) =

English Roman Catholic priest and martyr

Blessed James Bell
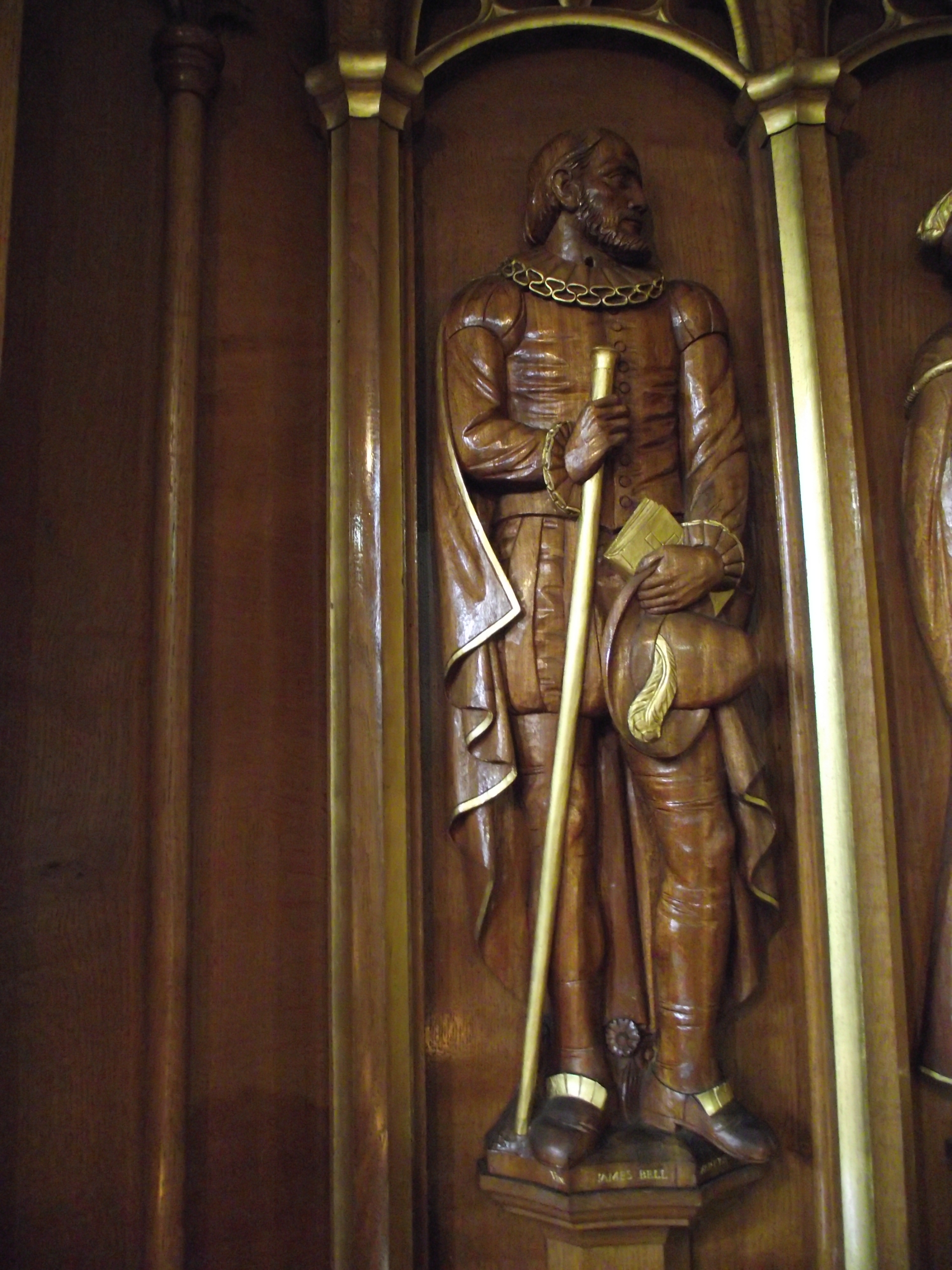
- Statue of Blessed Fr. James Bell in St. Werburgh's Church, Birkenhead

Martyr
- Born: 1520; Warrington, Lancashire, England
- Died: 20 April 1584 (aged 63–64); Lancaster Castle, Lancaster, Lancashire, England
- Venerated in: Roman Catholicism
- Beatified: 15 December 1929, Rome by Pope Pius XI
- Feast: 20 April; 4 May as one of the martyrs of the English Reformation
- Attributes: Rod or cane, book of hours, hat

James Bell (1524 – 20 April 1584) was an English Catholic priest and the only one of the Marian Priests that is known to have suffered martyrdom.

== Life ==
He was born at Warrington in Lancashire, in 1524, was educated at Oxford University, where he was ordained priest in Queen Mary's reign. For some time he refused to conform to the alterations in religion made by Queen Elizabeth; but afterwards, adopting the tenets of the Reformation, he exercised the functions of a minister of the Church of England for twenty years.

In 1581 he solicited a lady to use her good offices to procure for him a small Readership, of which her husband was the patron. This lady, being a Catholic, induced him to be reconciled to the Church. Moved by her words he sought reconciliation with the Catholic Church in 1581, and after "spending some months devoting himself to penance and spiritual exercises, applying himself to the study of the Breviary, the ceremonies of the Holy Mass, the Sacraments and the other duties of his priesthood", he was allowed to resume priestly functions. He laboured zealously as a missionary priest for two years among the poorer Catholics, in nearly all of the Catholic Houses and Mass-centres in Lancashire,

In January 1584, while travelling on foot from one Catholic house to another, he asked directions of a man who turned out to be a spy. Bell was apprehended by this pursuivant at Golborne, and imprisoned in Salford Gaol. He was later brought to trial at the Lent Assizes at Lancaster "on horseback with his arms being pinioned and his legs bound under the horse", a painful form of transportation. His trial was heard along with that of the layman John Finch, and Thomas Williamson and Richard Hutton who were also both Catholic priests.

He was interrogated by Justices Huddleston and Parker on 18 April 1584. Bell was about sixty years of age, and somewhat hard of hearing, so did not hear all that was said to him, and did not always reply. This was taken as a sign that his constancy was failing, so the next day, 19 April, they sought to terrify him with the description of the manner of his death, but he was unmoved by this.

Finally they asked him whether he had been reconciled (to the Catholic Church) or not. He admitted that he had and they said "oh that is High Treason", as the law of the time stipulated for Catholic priests in England. However, Bell replied: "it is nothing else than the Holy Sacrifice of Penance". The Court is said to have been filled with laughter and scorn on hearing this, Bell then said: "I forgive sins not by mine own power, but because I am a priest and have authority to absolve from sins".

James Bell behaved with great courage, and on being convicted said to the judge: "I beg your lordship, for the love of God, to add to the sentence that my lips and the tops of my fingers may be cut off for having sworn and subscribed to the articles of heretics, contrary both to my conscience and to God's truth."

The night before his execution was spent in prayer and meditation and he is said to have, in few words, exhorted all condemned prisoners to the Catholic faith and true repentance. He then asked his companion, John Finch, to instruct them more at large, as he was elderly and at that point weakened by the privations he had endured.

On the morning of his execution, 20 April 1584, he is said to have said, "O blessed day, O the fairest day that I ever saw in my life", he then refused an Anglican Minister's services saying: "for I will not believe thee nor hear thee but against my will". When he was taken off the hurdle that had carried him to the place of his death, the executioners forced him to look upon John Finch, who was being quartered at that time. When he saw the hangman pull out Finch's bowels he said, "O why do I tarry so long behind my sweet brother; let me make haste after him. This is a most happy day". He is then said to have prayed for all Catholics and for the conversion of all heretics.

Bell was hanged and quartered at Lancaster Castle on 20 April 1584. John Finch, a layman, suffered at the same time and place for being reconciled to the Catholic Church, and denying the Queen's spiritual supremacy.

Fr. James Bell was among the 108 martyrs beatified by Pope Pius XI on 15 December 1929.

== Veneration ==
Blessed James Bell is commemorated on the Martyrs' Plaque in Lancaster Cathedral; in a stained glass window of St. Mary's Church, Warrington; in a stained glass window of the closed Our Lady's Church, Latchford, Warrington; there is a statue of him in the Lady Chapel of St. Werburgh's Church, Birkenhead and up until its demolition in the early 1990s, St Benedict's Church, Warrington had a building named the 'Bell Hall' near its former school. On 1 May 2018 the parishes of St Mary's, St Benedict and St. Oswald in Warrington to combined to form a new parish under the patronage of Blessed James Bell.
