= Saint Benedict's College =

Saint Benedict's College may refer to a number of schools, including:

== Trinidad and Tobago ==
- Presentation College, San Fernando, formerly St. Benedict's College, San Fernando, Trinidad and Tobago
- Saint Benedict's College (Trinidad and Tobago), in La Romaine

== United Kingdom ==
- St Benedict's Catholic College, Colchester, Essex, England
- St Benedict's College (Liverpool), England
- St Benedict's College, Randalstown, Antrim, Northern Ireland

== United States ==
- College of Saint Benedict and Saint John's University, St. Joseph, Minnesota, U.S.
  - St. Benedict's Convent and College Historic District
- Benedictine College, formerly St. Benedict's College, Atchison, Kansas, U.S.

== Other countries ==
- St Benedict's College, New Norcia, Western Australia, Australia
- St Benedict's College, Bedfordview, Johannesburg, South Africa
- St. Benedict's College, Colombo, Sri Lanka

== See also ==
- Benedict College, Columbia, South Carolina, U.S.
- St Benedict's (disambiguation)
- St Benedict's School (disambiguation)
