= St. Benedict Catholic Secondary School =

St. Benedict Catholic Secondary School may refer to:

- St. Benedict Catholic Secondary School (Cambridge)
- St. Benedict Catholic Secondary School (Sudbury)
