= St. Benedict's Abbey (Kansas) =

Benedectine monastery in Atchison, Kansas

- Location within Kansas Location within the United States

Monastery information
- Full name: Abbey of St. Benedict
- Order: Benedictine
- Established: April 1857
- Mother house: Saint Vincent Archabbey
- Dedication: St. Benedict of Nursia
- Diocese: Kansas City

People
- Founders: Dom Augustus Wirth, O.S.B.
- Abbot: The Right Rev. James R. Albers, O.S.B.
- Important associated figures: Abbot Boniface Wimmer, O.S.B., Bishop Louis Mary Fink, O.S.B.

Architecture
- Functional status: monastery
- Completed date: 1931

Site
- Location: 1020 N. Second St., Atchison, Kansas 66002 United States
- Coordinates: 39°34′30″N 95°06′40″W
- Website: www.kansasmonks.org

St. Benedict's Abbey is an American community of monks of the Order of St. Benedict located in Atchison, Kansas. It was founded in 1857 to provide education to the sons of German settlers in the Kansas Territory.

== History ==
In the middle of the 19th century, Metten Abbey in Bavaria, founded in 766, decided to send a number of its monks to the United States as part of the abbey's American mission project. The German monks sought new locations where they could pursue their religious calling in peace as well as looking to provide spiritual guidance to the many German emigrants to America in that period. Their initial foundation was in Latrobe, Pennsylvania, where they established Saint Vincent Archabbey in 1846. The founder, Abbot Boniface Wimmer, O.S.B., was the Superior of the mission.

After helping his confreres to establish that first monastery, in the mid-1850s, a member of the monastery, Heinrich (Henry) Lemke, O.S.B., left Pennsylvania and moved to Kansas, where there was a large number of German immigrants. He settled in the small town of Doniphan, Kansas, the first monk in the territory, where he established the Church of St. John the Baptist. He was joined in April 1857 by two more monks, Augustus Wirth, O.S.B., designated as prior of the new community, and Casimir Seitz, O.S.B. Although the small community was declared autonomous the following year by the American-Cassinese Benedictine Congregation of which it was a part, by that time Wirth was alone, as the other two monks had returned to the United States.

Wirth and a companion were invited by John Baptist Miège, S.J., the Vicar Apostolic of the territory, to relocate to Atchison to operate a school for boys. They did so in 1858, and established St. Benedict's College, which today is known as Benedictine College. Originally, the mainly classical school curriculum was intended to prepare students for the priesthood. It was expanded to include commerce subjects to cater to the needs of the local population, which consisted primarily of farmers and miners. Under a new prior, Louis Mary Fink, O.S.B., the school was incorporated by the State of Kansas in 1868. The monastery was raised to the status of an independent abbey in 1877, with Innocent Wolf, O.S.B., being elected its first abbot.

The high school division of the college was made independent in 1919 as Maur Hill Prep School. With the college considered an extension of the monastery, the monks did not seek their own civil incorporation until 1931, when the debt incurred in the building of the new monastery threatened the accreditation of the college.

== Current status ==
The monastic community of the abbey today numbers some 50 monks. The current head is Abbot James Albers, O.S.B. The abbey continues to be heavily involved in the life and decision making of Benedictine College.

In 1962 the abbey established a daughter foundation in Brazil: Mosteiro São Jose, located in Mineiros, Goiás.
