= Monastery of St. Benedict =

The Monastery of St. Benedict may refer to:

- Monastery of St. Benedict (Norcia), Italy
- Monastery of St. Benedict (João Pessoa), Brazil
- Saint Benedict's Monastery (St. Joseph, Minnesota), United States
- St. Benedict's Monastery (Colorado), in Snowmass, Colorado, United States
- Quarr Abbey, a Benedictine Monastery on the Isle of Wight, UK located near Ryde, Isle of Wight, UK
- Benediktbeuern Abbey, an institute of the Salesians of Don Bosco in Benediktbeuern, Bavaria, Germany
