= St. Benedict the Moor Catholic Church (Pittsburgh) =

Church of St. Benedict the Moor
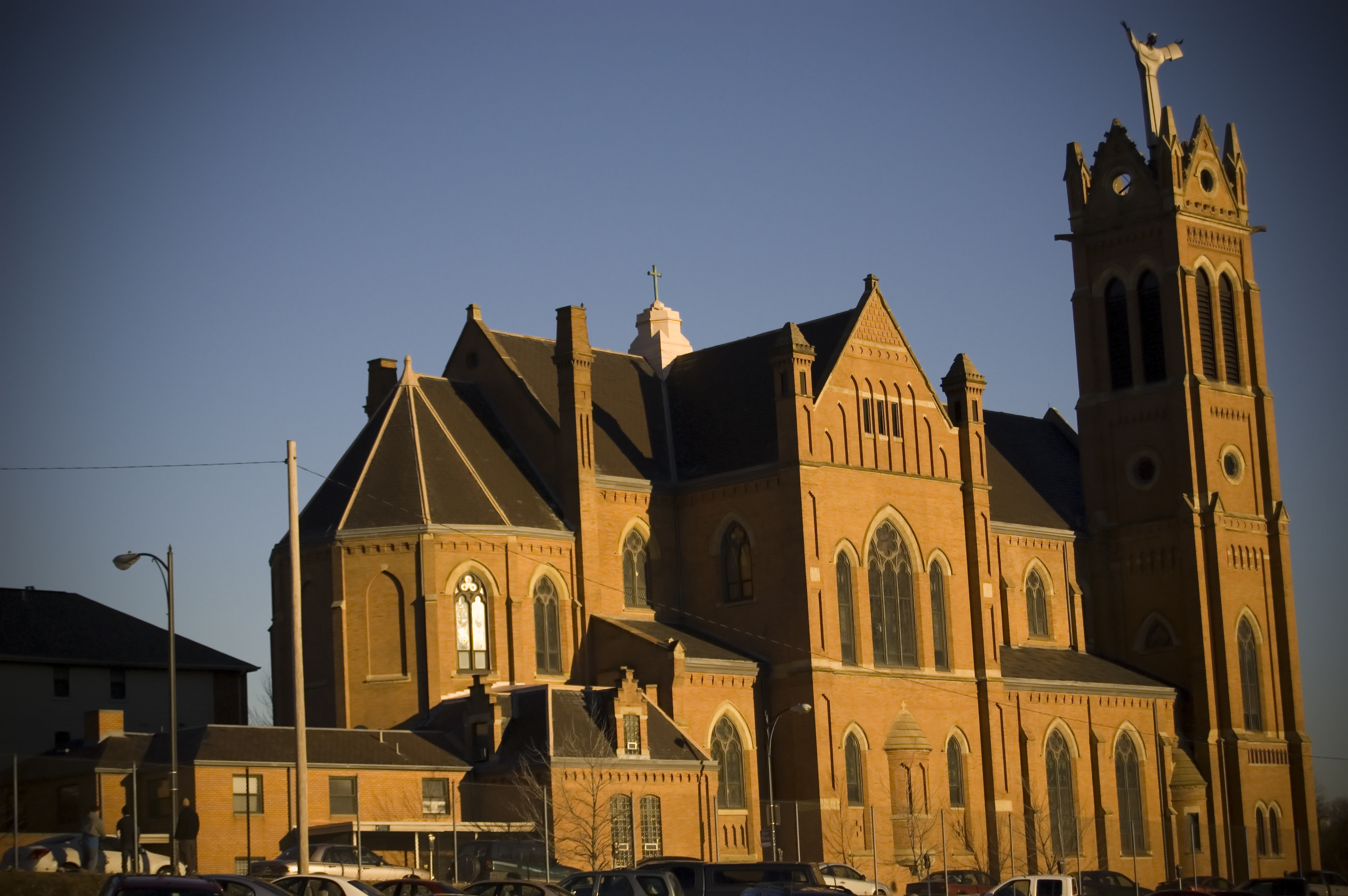

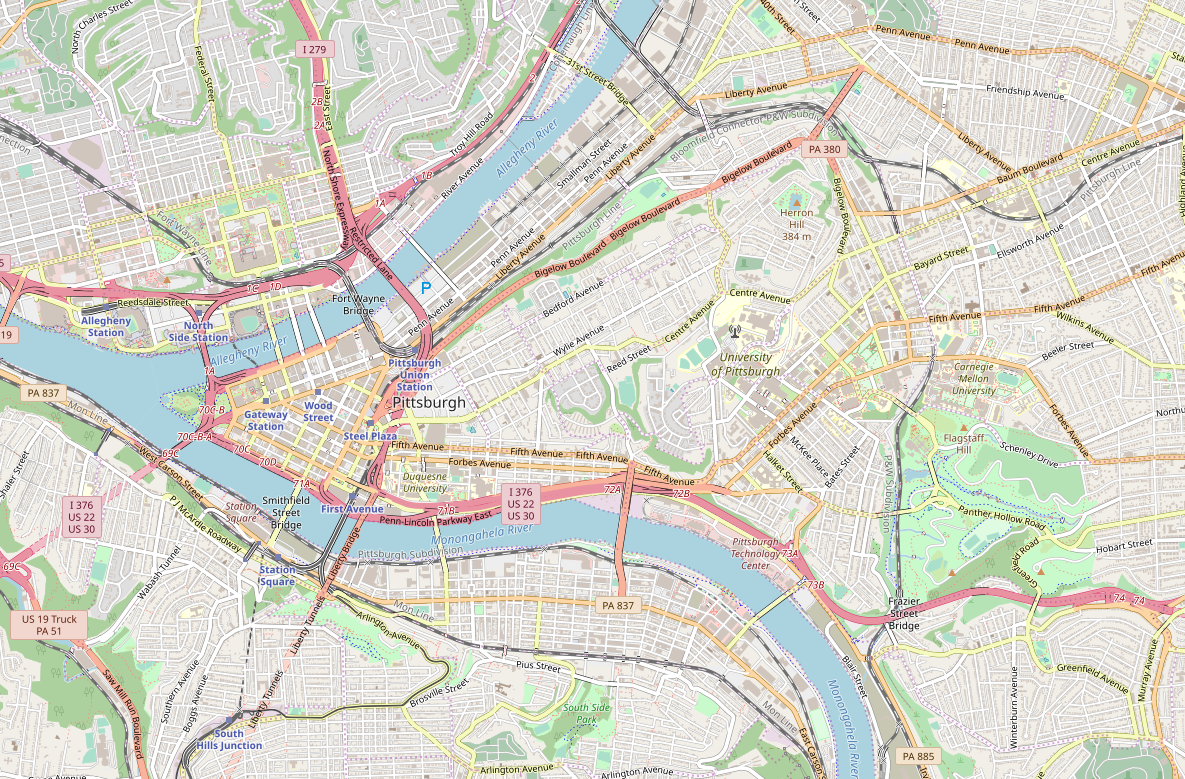
- Location of the Church of St. Benedict the Moor in Downtown Pittsburgh
- 40°26′29.08″N 79°59′9.25″W
- Location: 89 Crawford Street (Hill District), Pittsburgh, Pennsylvania, USA

History
- Built: 1894

Site notes
- Architect: Moeser & Bippus

Pittsburgh Landmark – PHLF
- Designated: 1998

St. Benedict the Moor Catholic Church is a Black Catholic parish in the Hill District neighborhood of Pittsburgh, Pennsylvania. It was built in 1894 and became a personal parish for African-Americans in June 2020.

== History ==
The building had been Holy Trinity Church which was suppressed (closed) in 1958.

In the 1960s, St. Benedict's parish, established in 1889, merged with that parish and two others and the building became its church.

The 18-foot tall statue of St. Benedict the Moor by Frederick Charles Shrady was installed atop its tower in 1968.

The building was added to the List of Pittsburgh History and Landmarks Foundation Historic Landmarks in 1998.

In June 2020, Pittsburgh's Bishop David Zubik announced that the church would officially become a personal parish for the Black Catholic community, having served informally as such for decades.
