= St Benedict's Church, Warrington =

Coordinates: 53.3986°N 2.5871°W

St. Benedict's Church, Warrington
- St. Benedict's Church, Orford, Warrington
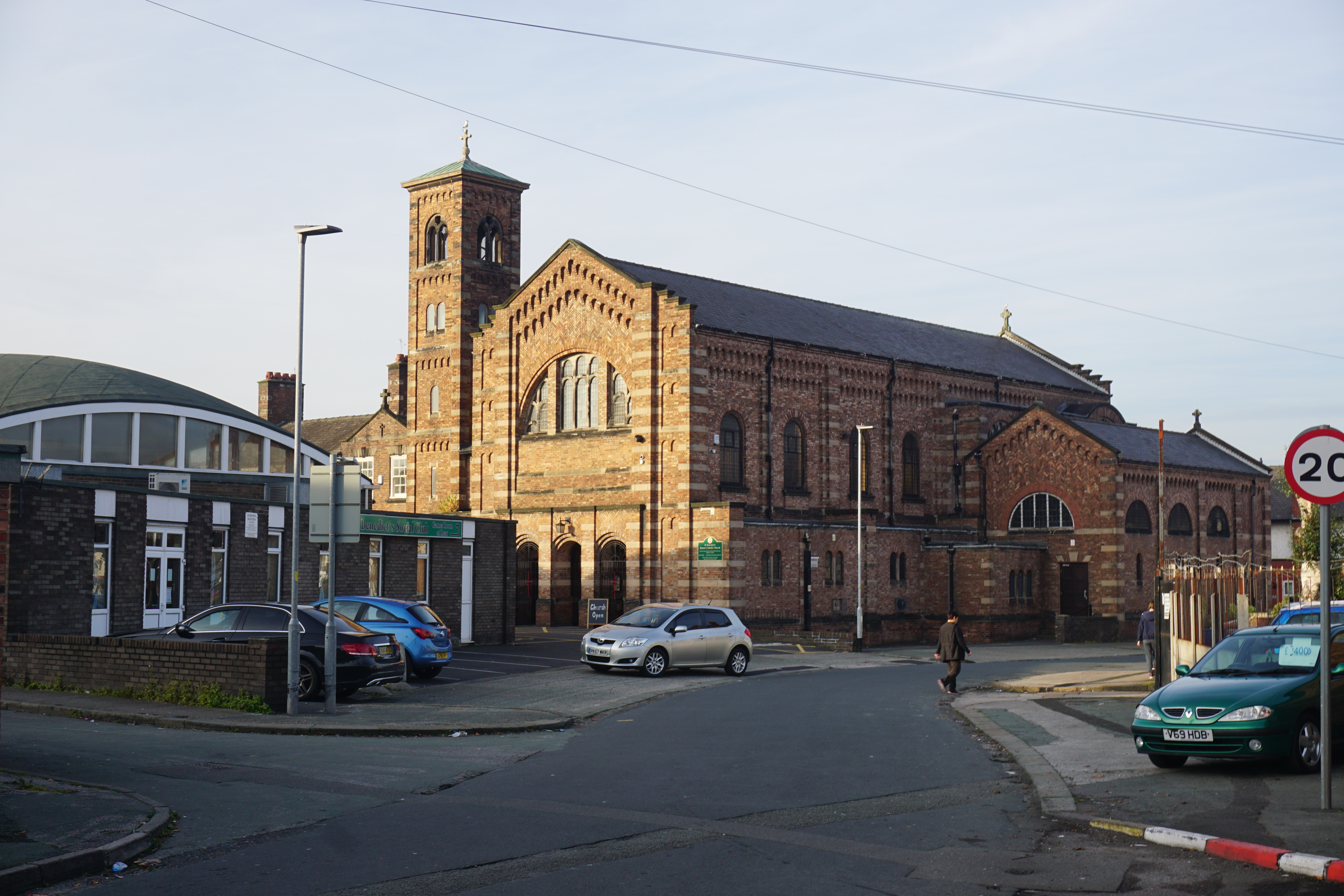

- Location in Cheshire
- OS grid reference: SJ 61059 89244
- Location: Warrington, Cheshire
- Country: England
- Denomination: Roman Catholic

History
- Status: Parish church
- Founded: 1902
- Founder: Ampleforth Abbey
- Dedication: St Benedict

Architecture
- Functional status: Active
- Architect: Matthew Honan
- Architectural type: Church
- Style: Neo-Byzantine
- Completed: 1915
- Construction cost: £6000

Administration
- Diocese: Liverpool
- Deanery: St. Gregory's, Warrington

Clergy
- Priest: Fr David Heywood

St Benedict's Church is an active Roman Catholic church in the Orford suburb of Warrington, Cheshire, England. The parish was founded by Benedictine monks from Ampleforth Abbey. It is now served by clergy from the Roman Catholic Archdiocese of Liverpool.

== History ==
A school was established on 10 January 1881 and Mass was said in the school building. Fr. Wilfred Baines O.S.B was given charge of the district 1986 but lived at St Mary's. However, on 8 March 1902 St. Benedict's became a separate parish from St Mary's Church, Warrington and it became the third Benedictine parish in Warrington: the others being St Alban's Church, Warrington (1755) and St Mary's Church, Warrington (1877). Fr Baines moved to a cottage next to the school in 1902. In 1904 a tin mission church was built in the school playground and was opened on 19 June 1904.

Fr Oswald Swarbreck OSB became the Rector in 1907 following the departure of Fr Baines. During his tenure a new priory (presbytery) was built on Rhodes Street which was completed on 11 January 1912 at a cost of £1,557. This was then followed by a new church which was formally opened on 11 July 1915 by Cardinal Bourne, the Archbishop of Westminster.

The High Altar was consecrated on 27 February 1927 by Archbishop Frederick Keating and had been built by Italian workmen. A new building for social purposes, the Bell Hall, named after the local Warrington martyr, Blessed James Bell was built in 1931 adjacent to the school. In 1943 the church was consecrated after the parish had managed to clear its debt. In 1965 a social club was built adjacent to the church.

The last Benedictine Parish Priest was Fr Augustine Measures O.S.B as the Abbot of Ampleforth Abbey surrendered the parish to the Archbishop of Liverpool in Easter 1986.

A new school building was built in 1991 and the former school and Bell Hall had been demolished by 1993. On 1 May 2018, St. Benedict's became part of one new combined parish called Blessed James Bell which also incorporates the former parishes of St Mary's and St Oswald's in Warrington.
