= Sir Thomas Boteler Church of England High School =

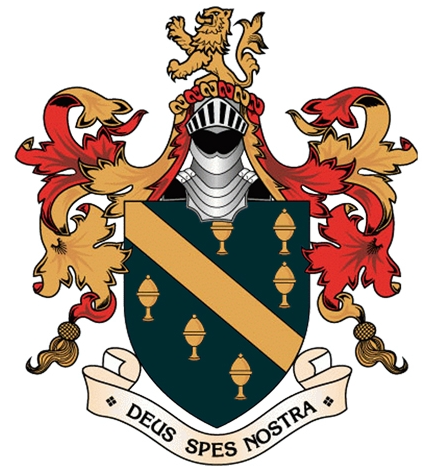

Location
- Grammar School Road; Latchford; Warrington, Cheshire, WA4 1JL; England; 53°22′49″N 2°33′57″W

Information
- Type: Academy
- Motto: Latin: Deus Spes Nostra; God is our hope
- Religious affiliation: Church of England
- Established: 1526; 500 years ago
- Local authority: Warrington
- Trust: The Challenge Academy Trust
- Department for Education URN: 144799 Tables
- Ofsted: Reports
- Headteacher: Scott-Herron
- Gender: Coeducational
- Age: 11 to 16
- Enrolment: 571
- Website: http://www.boteler.org.uk

Sir Thomas Boteler Church of England High School is a coeducational Church of England secondary school located in the Latchford area of Warrington in the English county of Cheshire.

== History ==
=== Grammar school ===
The school was founded in 1526 by Sir Thomas Boteler. He left a legacy to pay for the education of six "poor boyes of the parishe", and this foundation later developed into the Boteler Grammar School for Boys, serving the whole of Warrington. The original school was located in the then town centre located in the area around St Elphin's Church, now included in the Church Street Conservation Area. Its nineteenth-century building at School Brow was demolished some years ago.

==== The life of Sir Thomas Boteler ====
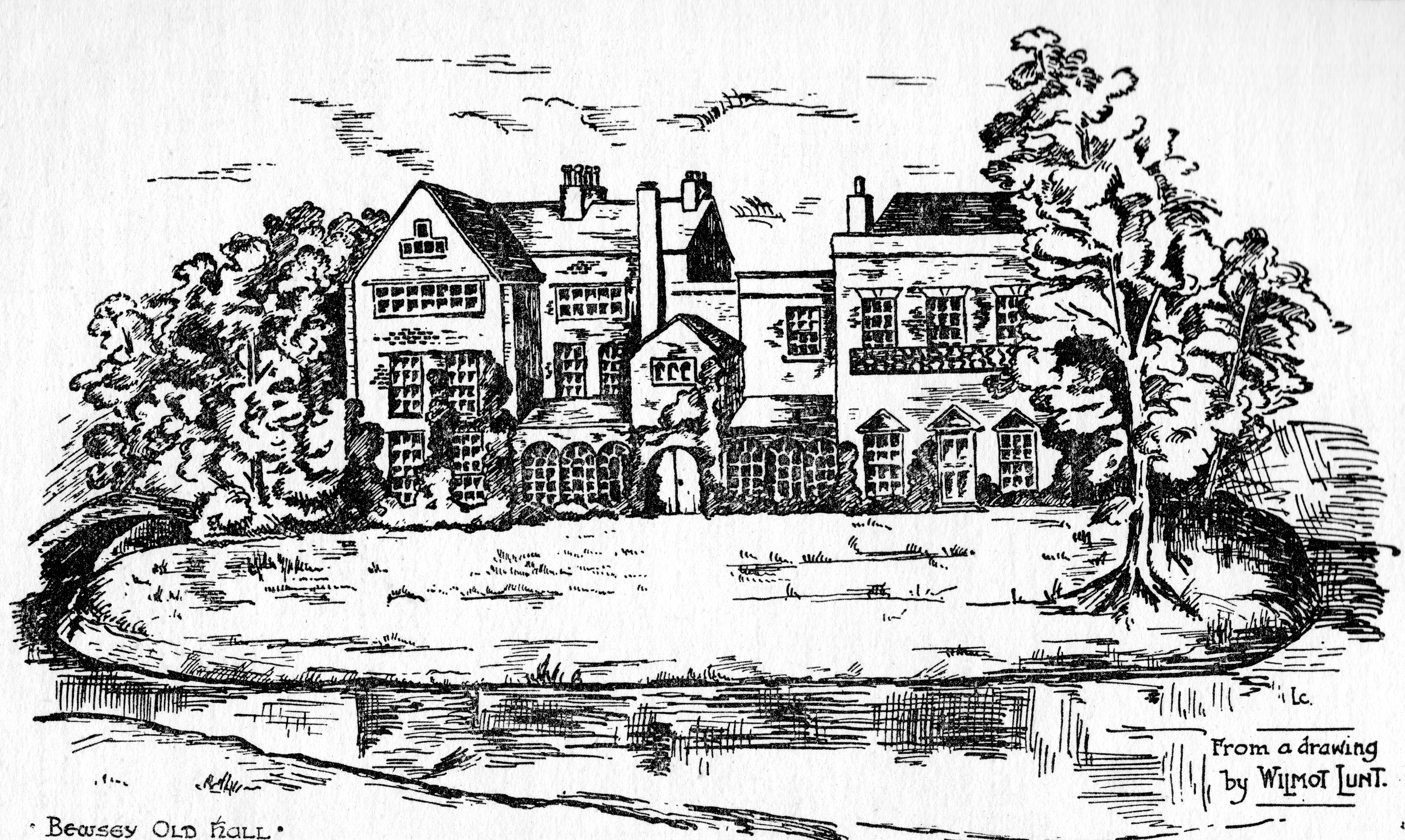
Bewsey Old Hall

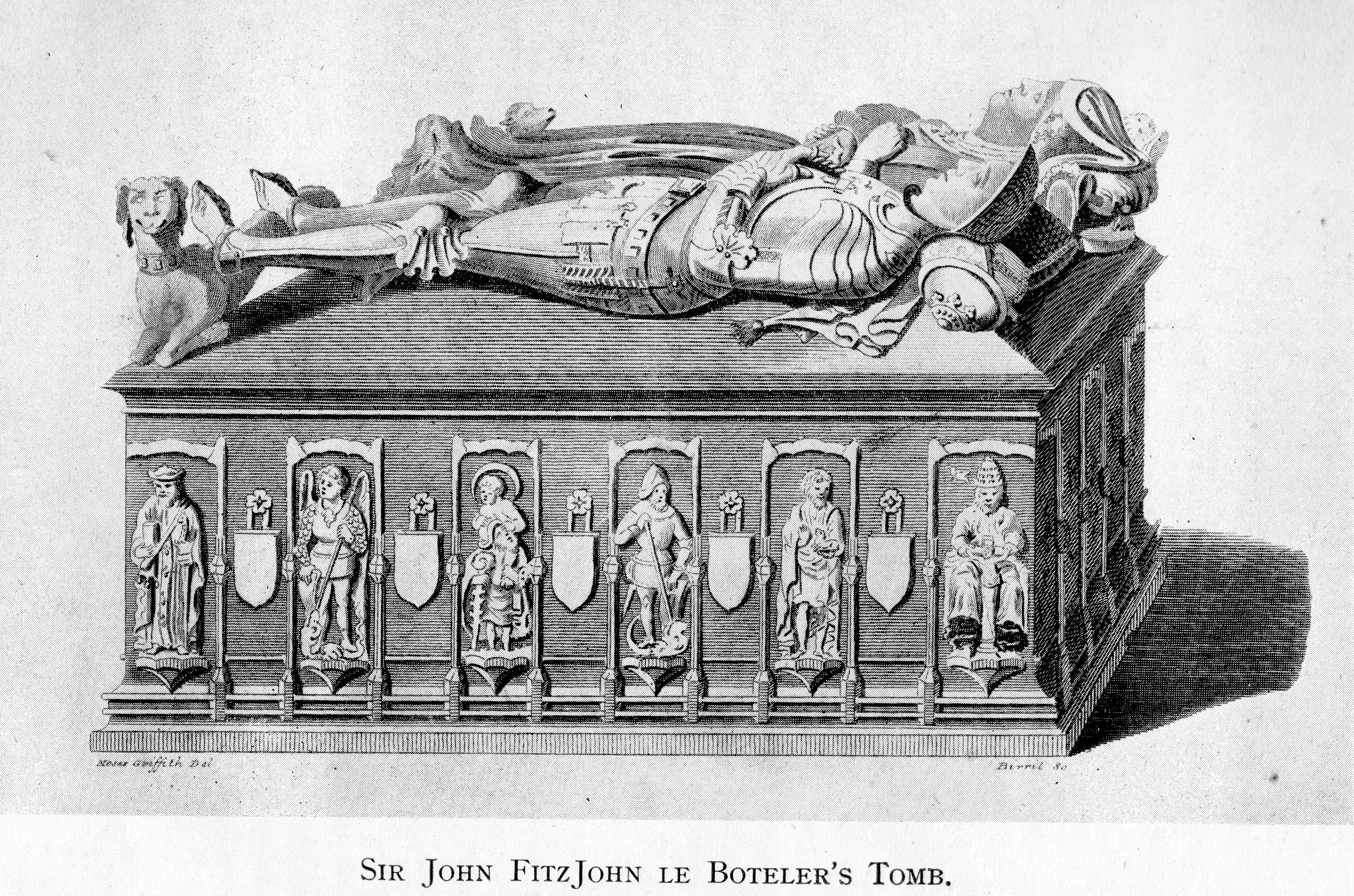
Boteler tomb in St Elphin's church

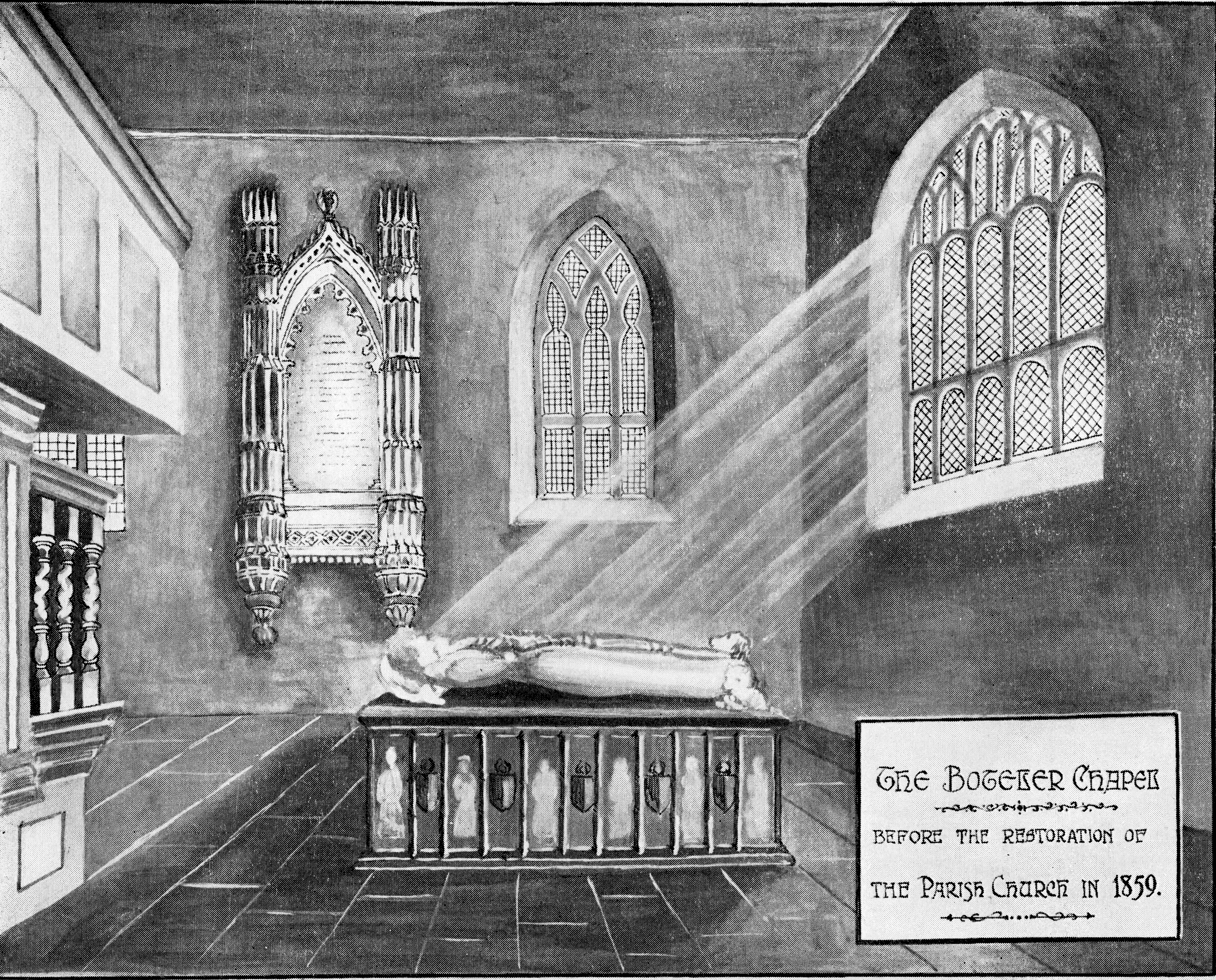
Boteler Chapel in St Elphin's church

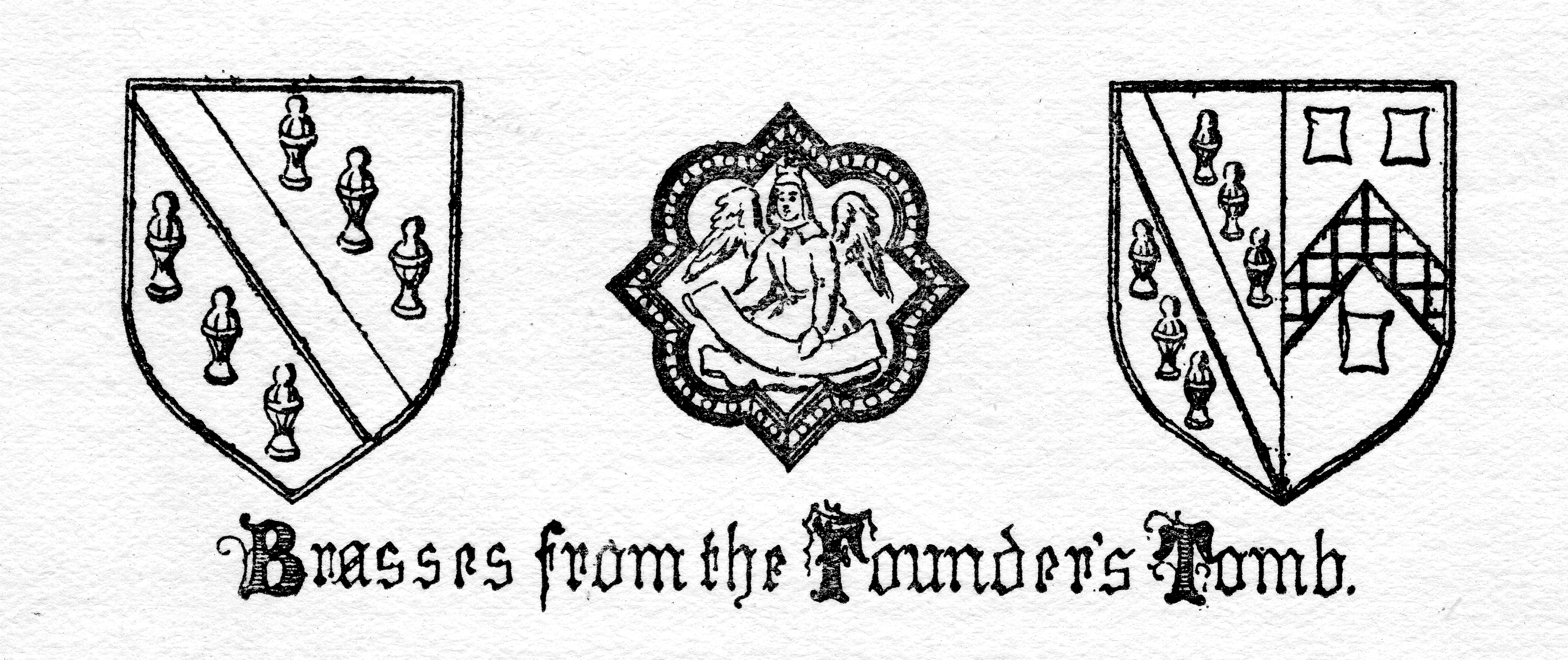
Brasses from the Boteler tomb

Thomas Boteler was born at Bewsey Old Hall in 1461. In 1463, his father Sir John FitzJohn le Boteler was murdered and Thomas's elder brother, William, inherited the estates. William died at the age of 22, fighting in the Lancastrian ranks at the Battle of Tewkesbury in 1471, at which time Thomas inherited the estates.

In November 1480 Thomas married Margaret, daughter of Sir John Delves of Doddington, who also fell at Tewkesbury.

Thomas, by his marriage, was related to Margaret, Countess of Richmond and when Henry of Richmond, Lady Margaret's son, landed at Milford Haven to regain the Crown of England for the Lancastrians, Thomas was part of the troops who marched south to help in the overthrow of Richard III at the battle of Bosworth Field in 1485. Thomas was either knighted on the battlefield or at the coronation of the new King, Henry VII.

In 1520 Sir Thomas headed the list of subscriptions for the building of the steeple at Lymm, and in the same year he made his last will, which provided for the foundation of the Boteler Grammar School.

Sir Thomas died at Bewsey on 27 April 1522 and was buried in the Boteler chapel of the St. Elphin's Church. A fragment of brass which decorated the marble slab of his tomb is preserved in Warrington Museum, together with several fragments of stained glass from the memorial window which was erected by his widow in 1529.

==== The founder's will (1520) and the foundation deed (1526) ====
The passage from Sir Thomas Boteler's will which provides for the school is:

And where I, the saide sir Thomas, have delyvered by indenture tripartite into the custody and kepynge of the right reverend father in God John th' abbot of Whalley that now is 500 marks in gold, savelie to be kept to myn use and to be disposed at my pleasure, it is my full will and mynde that myn executors shall have the dispocion and orderinge of the saide summe of 500 marks to purchase and obteyne lands and tennements or rents to the yerelie value of ten pound above all charges, or as much thereof as shall be unprovided and unpurchased by me the saide sir Thomas, and therwithe to founde a free grammar school in Weryngton to endure for ever... And it is my will that my executors during theire several lyves, and after theire decease that my heires from tyme to tyme shall denominate, name and appoynte an honest preste, groundely lernede in grammar, to be maister of the saide scole, whiche shall saye masse, pray and do dyvine service at the saide paroche churche of Weryngton for the soule of me the saide sir Thomas, dame Margaret my wyffe, myn ancestors, and myn heires after their deceases.

Sir Thomas' wishes were carried into effect by a deed signed on 26 April 1526. This deed, after recalling the Founder's intention to establish a school 'whereby mens sons might learn grammar to the Intent that they thereby might the better learn to know Almighty God" proceeds to make full regulations for the establishment and the conduct of the pupils. For example :

- The Master is to be an "honest ans discete Priest, sufficiently and groundedly learned in grammar", a house in "Bag Lane" is set apart for his use.
- It is also "ordeynd that the said schoolmaster shall teach any scholar coming to the sais school after Wittington's Grammar".
- No fees were to be paid, except "in the quarter next after Xtmas A Cock Penny & in any of the other three Quarters in the year one Potation Penny", which sums were to provide a cock-fight at Shrovetide and "A Drinking for all the said scholars" in the other quarters.
- All scholars were to go "two and two in processions on Sunday, Wednesday and Friday, about or within the Parish Church, singing the Litany and Responds". During the winter months they were to be at the church "between six and seven of the clock" every morning, and then immediately go to school, whence they were not to depart till five in the afternoon. In Summer they were to be at the church between five and six.
- Every year, on 27 April, the Founder's death was to be commemorated by a special Service, which was to be held in the Parish Church.
- No scholar was to wear "any Dagger, Hanger or other weapon invasive, other than a knife to cut his meat with".
- After they had been twelve months in Grammar the boys were to use to speak to one another "at all times and in every place, Latin and no English", and no scholar was to use "diceing or carding or other unlawfull games".

The full text of these documents can be found in Marsh.

==== The decline of the house of Boteler ====
The school's founder was succeeded by his son, also Thomas, who was knighted in 1533. In 1534 he was made High Sheriff of Lancashire, and in the same year was granted the arms which his father had borne before him.

In 1550 the second Sir Thomas Boteler died; his son became the third Sir Thomas Boteler. In 1570 he was also made High Sheriff of Lancashire and in 1571 he was one of the two Members of Parliament for the county. He died in 1579.

His son Edward rapidly wasted his inheritance and signed a series of deeds making over the succession of all the Boteler estates to Robert Dudley, 1st Earl of Leicester, who seems to have lent him much money and to have demanded this security. Edward died in 1586 leaving no heirs and the long history of the Boteler family ended.

The new owner soon sold the estates, which eventually passed to the ancestors of Baron Lilford who continued to nominate two members of the Board of Governors of the Grammar School into the twentieth century.

==== The first two Masters ====
There are very few records of the School during the first hundred years. The first Head-master was Richard Taylor. He appears in the Bewsey register in 1524, two years before the signing of the foundation deed as "owing 19 d for the school-house". He is last mentioned in 1569, and the name of his successor, John Wakefield, first appears in 1576.

John Wakefield and Edward Boteler were close, for the latter bequeathed to "John Wakefield Scholemr of Warrington fortie pounds in money", and appointed him as one of his executors. John Wakefield died in 1605, and is buried at Warrington.

There is little doubt that Wakefield and Edward Boteler enriched themselves at the expense of the School and nearly ruined the Foundation.

==== The re-foundation in 1608 ====
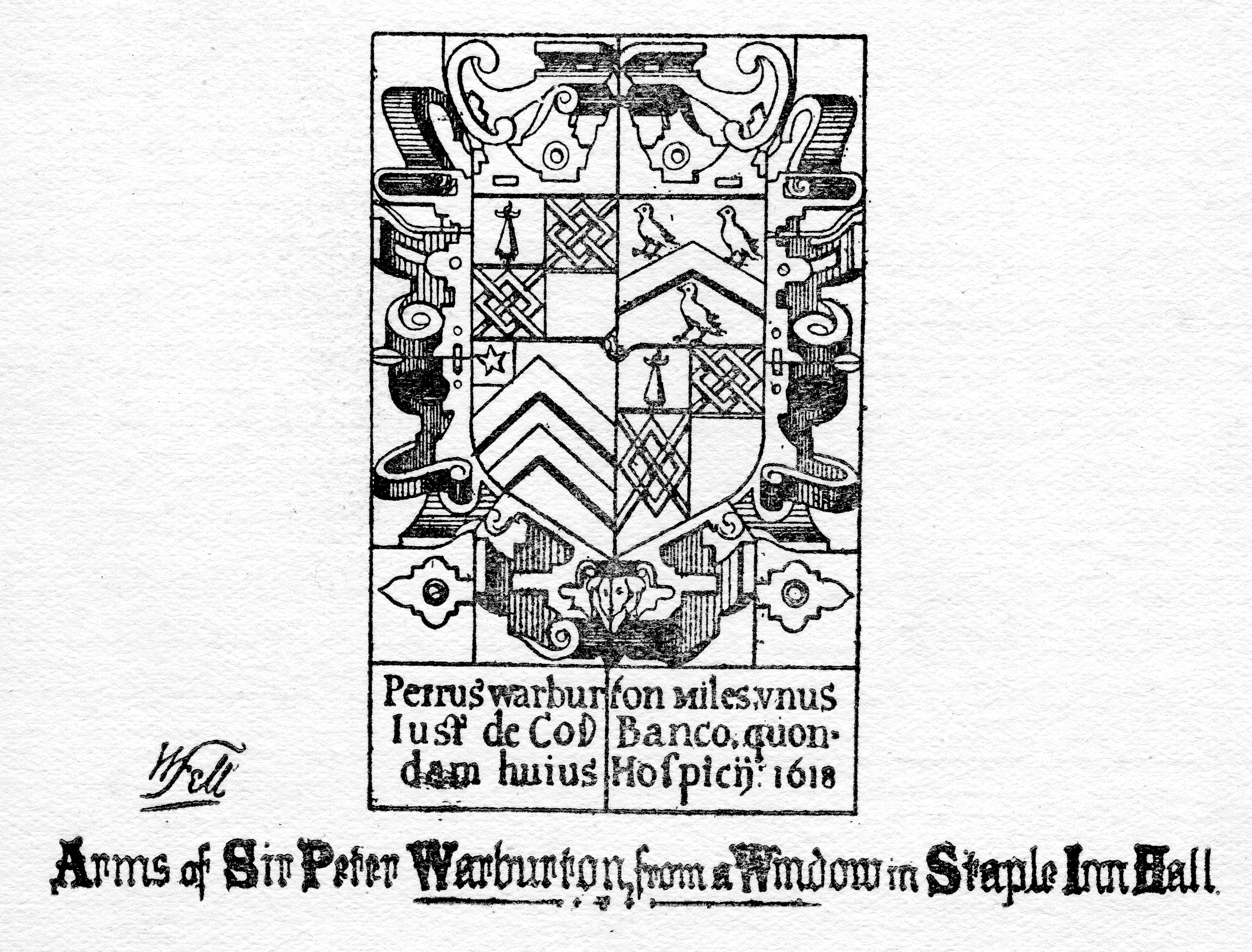
Sir Peter Warburton's arms

When Edward Boteler died in 1586, he left two sisters : Elizabeth, married to Sir Peter Warburton and Margaret, married to John Manwaringe. With the connivance of John Wakefield, John Manwaringe had secured possession of nearly all the School lands, so that the Foundation was "in greate ruyne and decay".

In 1602, Sir Peter Warburton, a lawyer and bencher of Staples Inn, took upon himself the task of recovering the lost estates of the School. To this end he filed a Bill of Complaint in the Court of the Duchy of Lancaster.

The court issued its decree in 1607, the full text of which can be found in Gray and a summary in Marsh. The re-foundation deed were based upon this decree and were confirmed by the Commission of Charitable Uses on 11 September 1610.

Sir Peter added to the benefactions by granting to the School a rent charge of £5 per annum issuing out of a messuage in Chester. Thomas Tildisley, who assisted Sir Peter in helping to save the School, contributed to the repair of the School.

==== The Boteler Grammar School in the seventeenth and eighteenth centuries ====
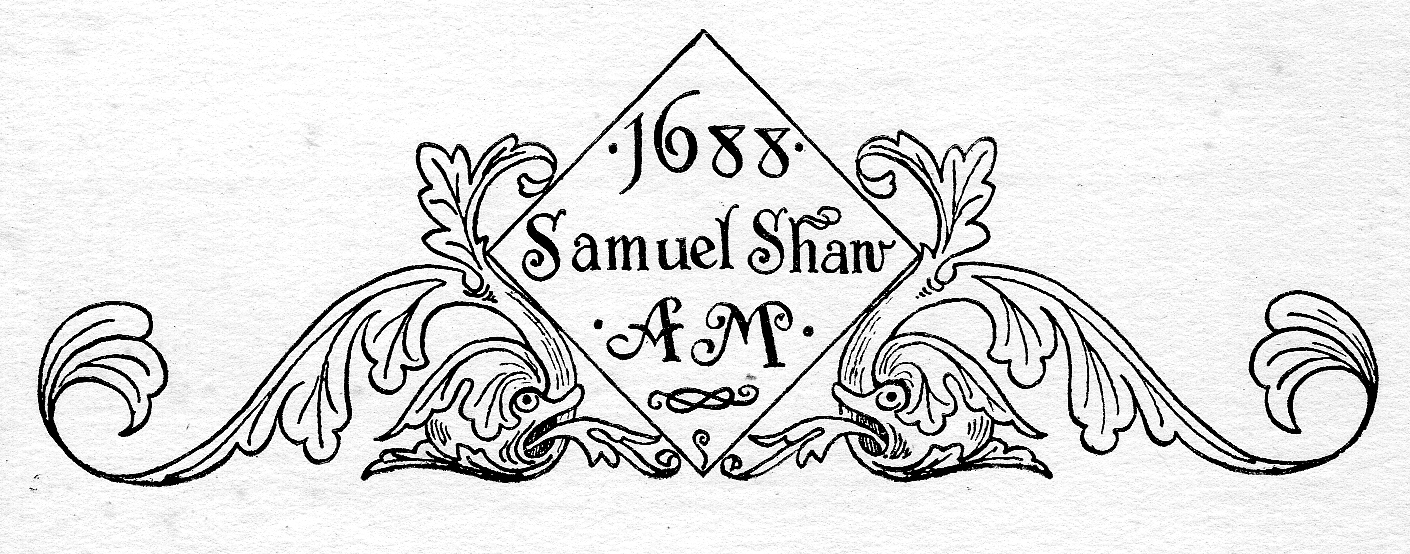
Samuel Shaw plaque (1688)

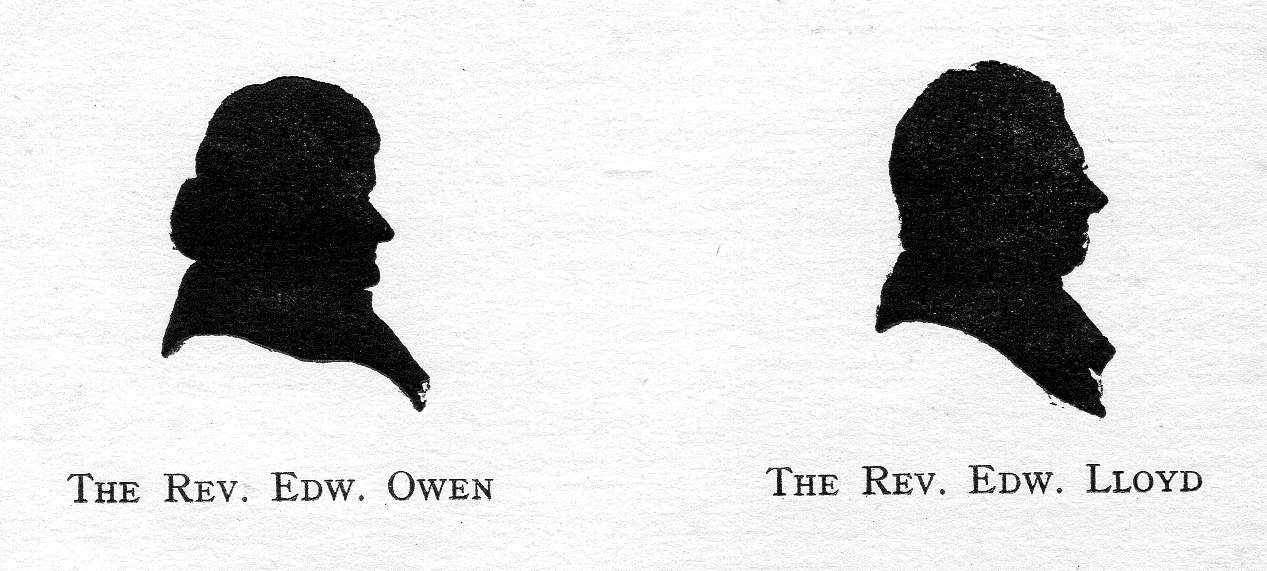
Edward Owen and Edward Lloyd

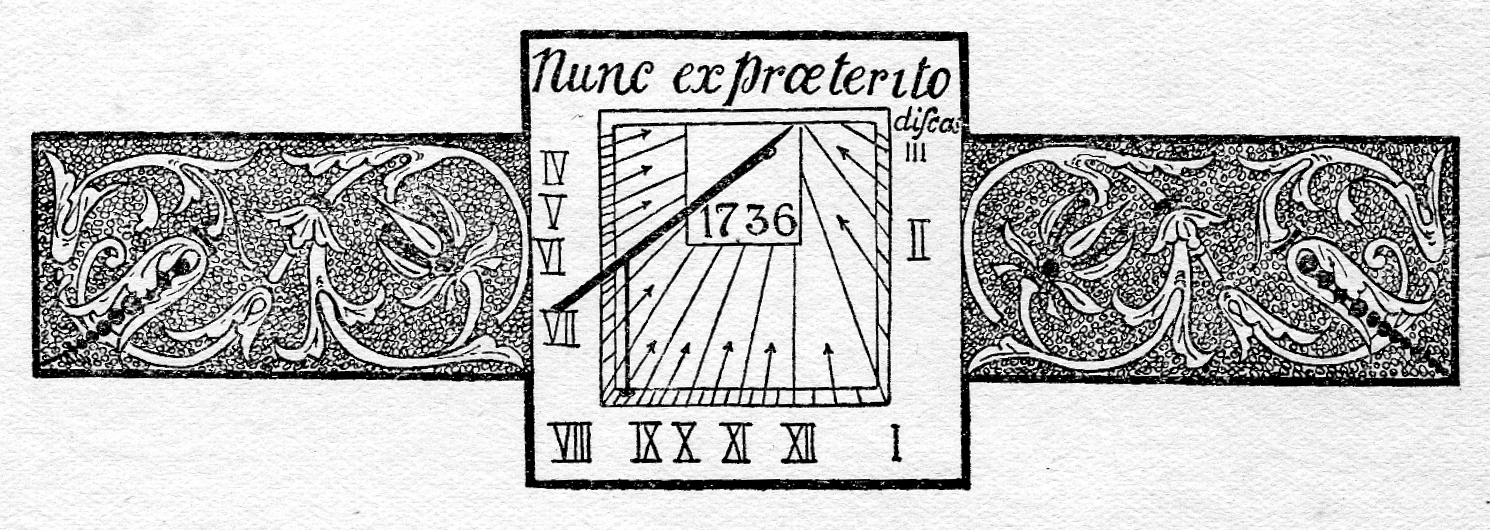
The Hayward sundial (1736)

The School-house and premises were rebuilt by the Head-master, Samuel Shaw, in 1688. The commemorative plaque was later conserved in the Victorian building of 1863. Shaw became Rector of Warrington in 1691 and he did much for the Church: in 1697 he built the square tower, which was demolished in 1859 when the spire was built.

The last Headmaster of the century was Edward Owen, famous for his Latin translations. It was said of him that he was "a man of most elegant learning, unimpeachable veracity, and peculiar benevolence of heart".

The silhouettes of Owen and his curate, Edward Lloyd are from Warrington Worthies.

==== The Boteler Grammar School in the nineteenth century ====
The first quarter of the 19th century was marked by two unfortunate choices of Head-master : Robert Atherton Rawstorne (1807–1814) and William Bordman (1815–1828). The former had no intention of teaching and appointed as his "usher" the Rev. William Bordman. The new Master left the entire management of the school to Bordman, who also occupied the School-house, thus converting the mastership into a sinecure. In 1810 several leading Warrington citizens took upon themselves the duty, and expense, of filing an information in the Court of Chancery. The judgement was issued in 1814 and Rawstorne was obliged to vacate the Mastership; he was replaced by Bordman. Unfortunately the behaviour of Bordman was such that constant complaints were made against him, and in 1828 the Trustees of the School agreed to pay him to retire !

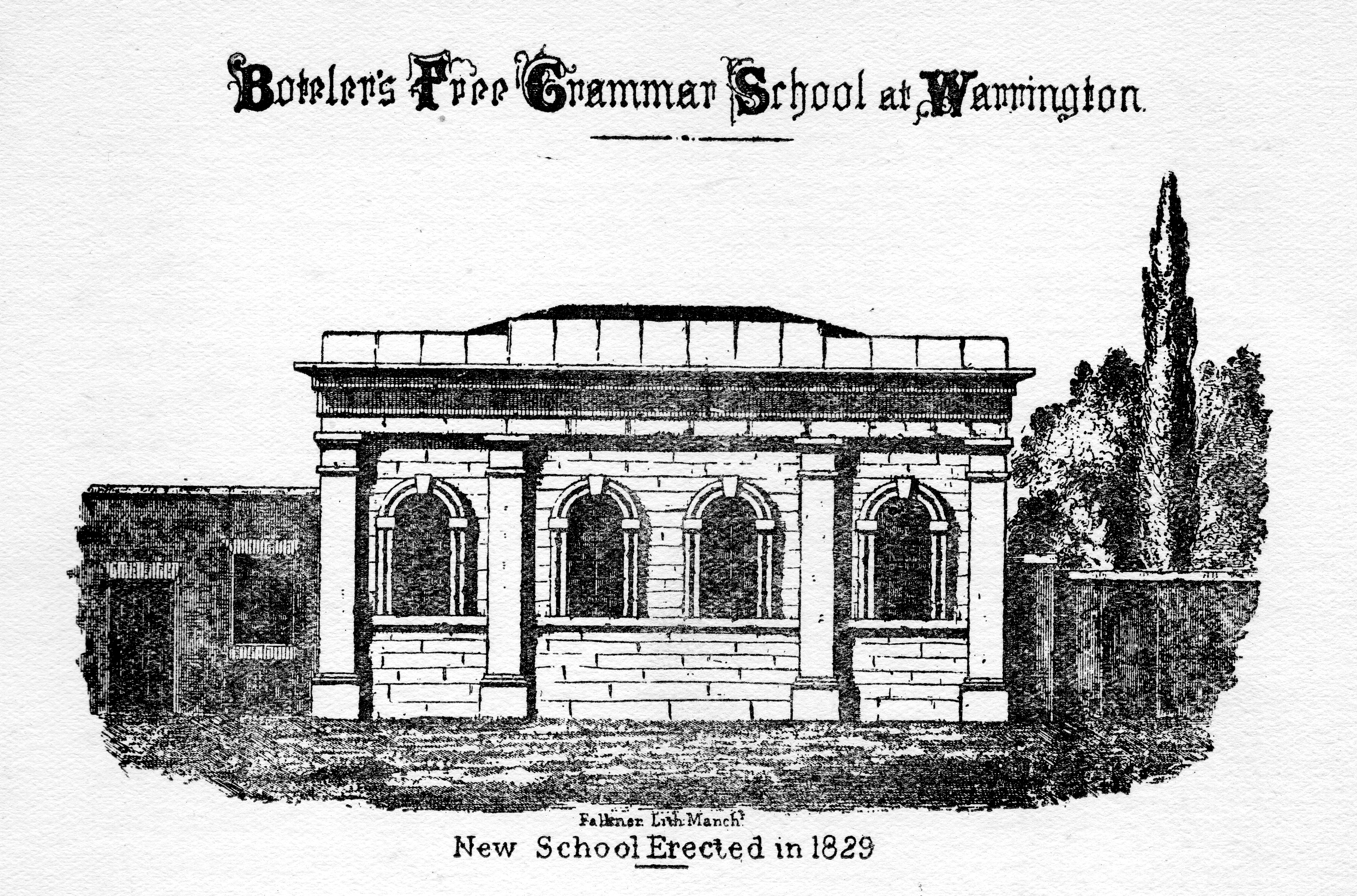
Grammar School in 1829

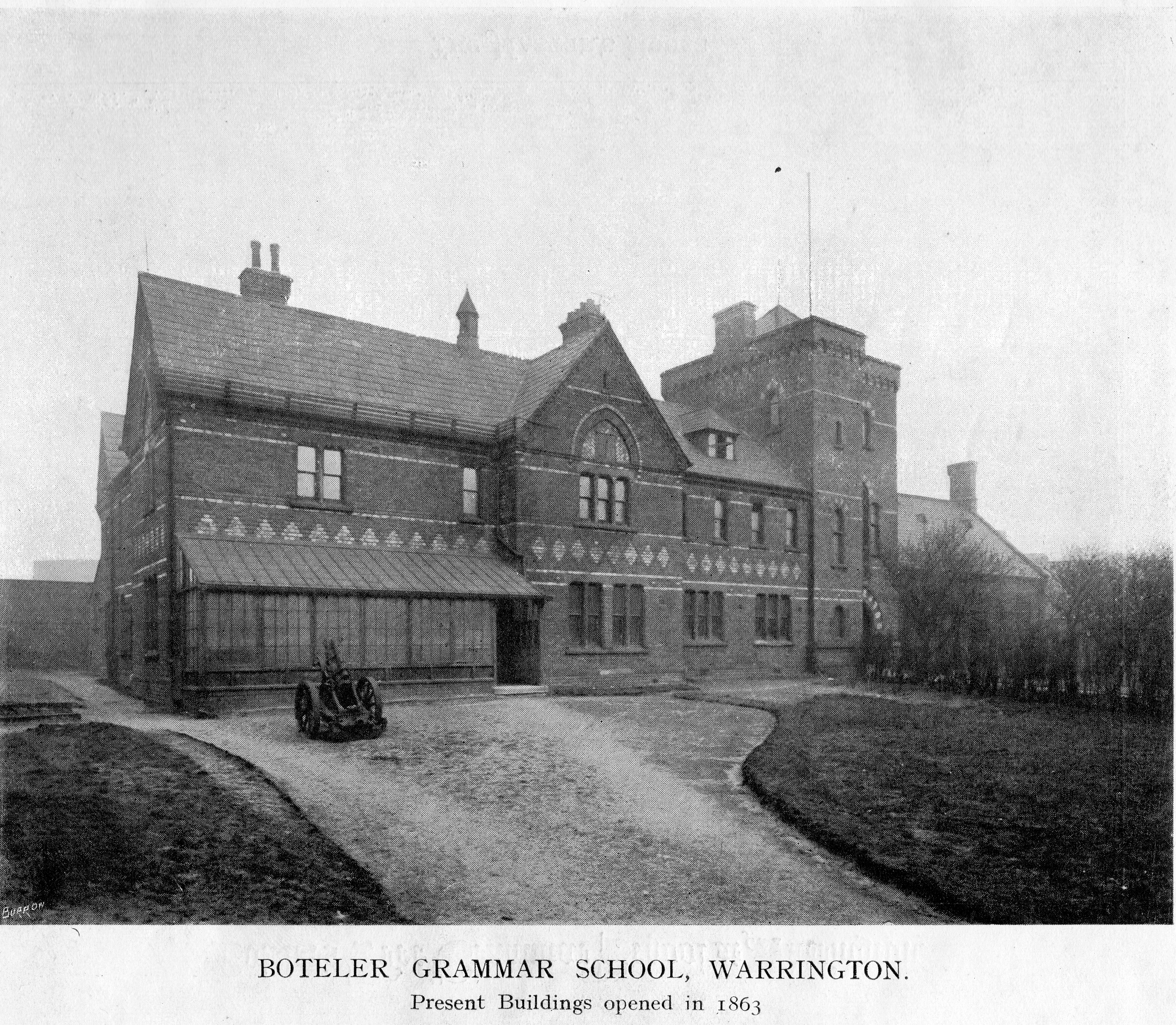
Grammar School circa 1900

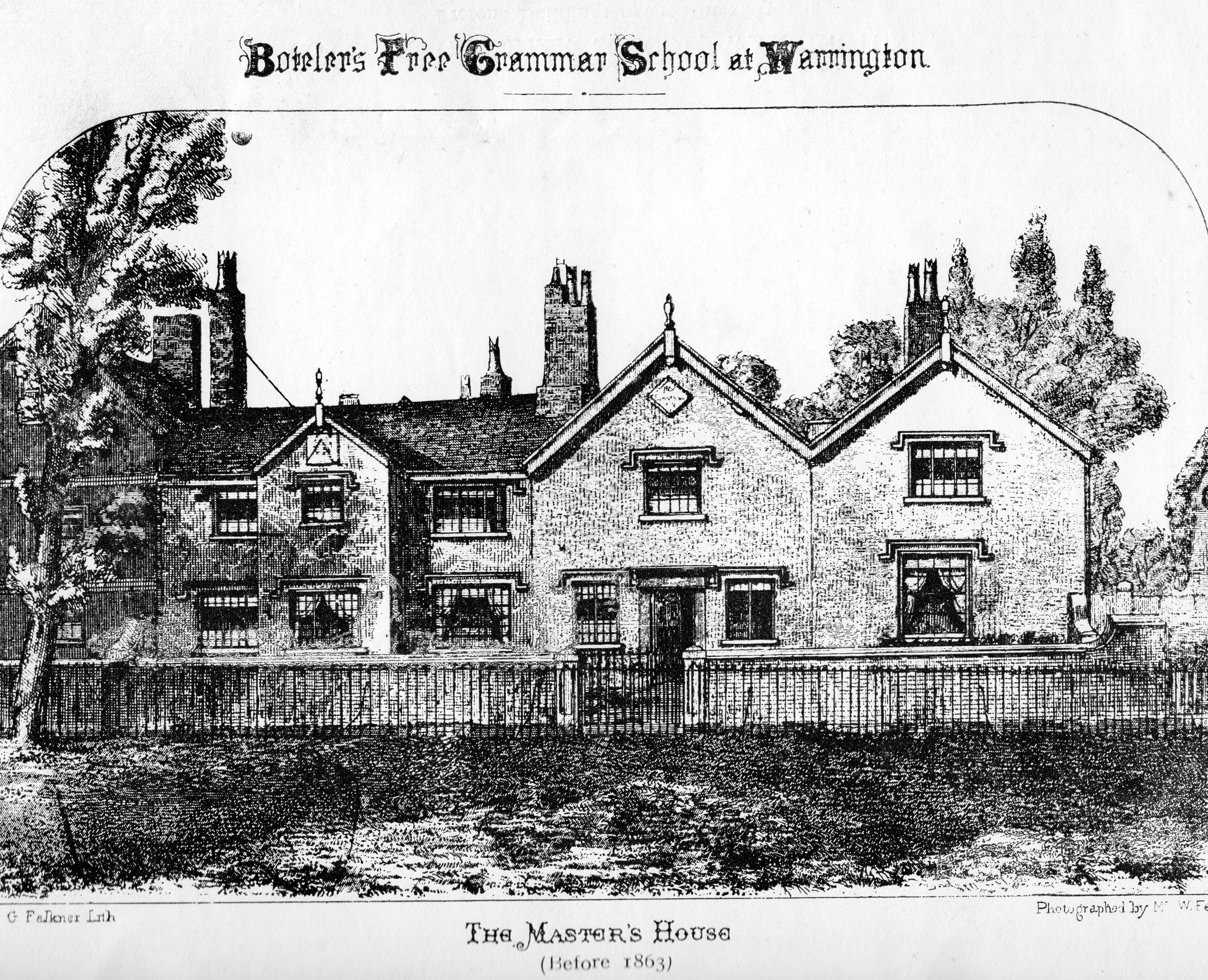
The Master's house circa 1850

The Chancery suit of 1810 had resulted in a fund, paid into Court and in 1829, after the departure of Bordman, this fund was used to build a new school, capable of accommodating 120 boys. The new Head-master, Thomas Vere Bayne, took a keen interest in the education of his pupils. His interest was not only confined to his own school; at that time thoughtful people were beginning to realise that no provision at all was made for the elementary education of the masses. The State had left this responsibility to voluntary societies, the chief among them being the National Society. Bayne and the Rector of Warrington raised the money for building and maintaining the National Schools in Church street, which were opened in 1833.

In 1861 the school's Trustees decided to remodel the buildings. The master's house, parts of which dated from before 1526 was pulled down, as was the new school of 1829. They were replaced by a building of Victorian Gothic style. The school reopened in 1863 and the building was used until the late 1940s.

==== The Boteler Grammar School in the twentieth century ====
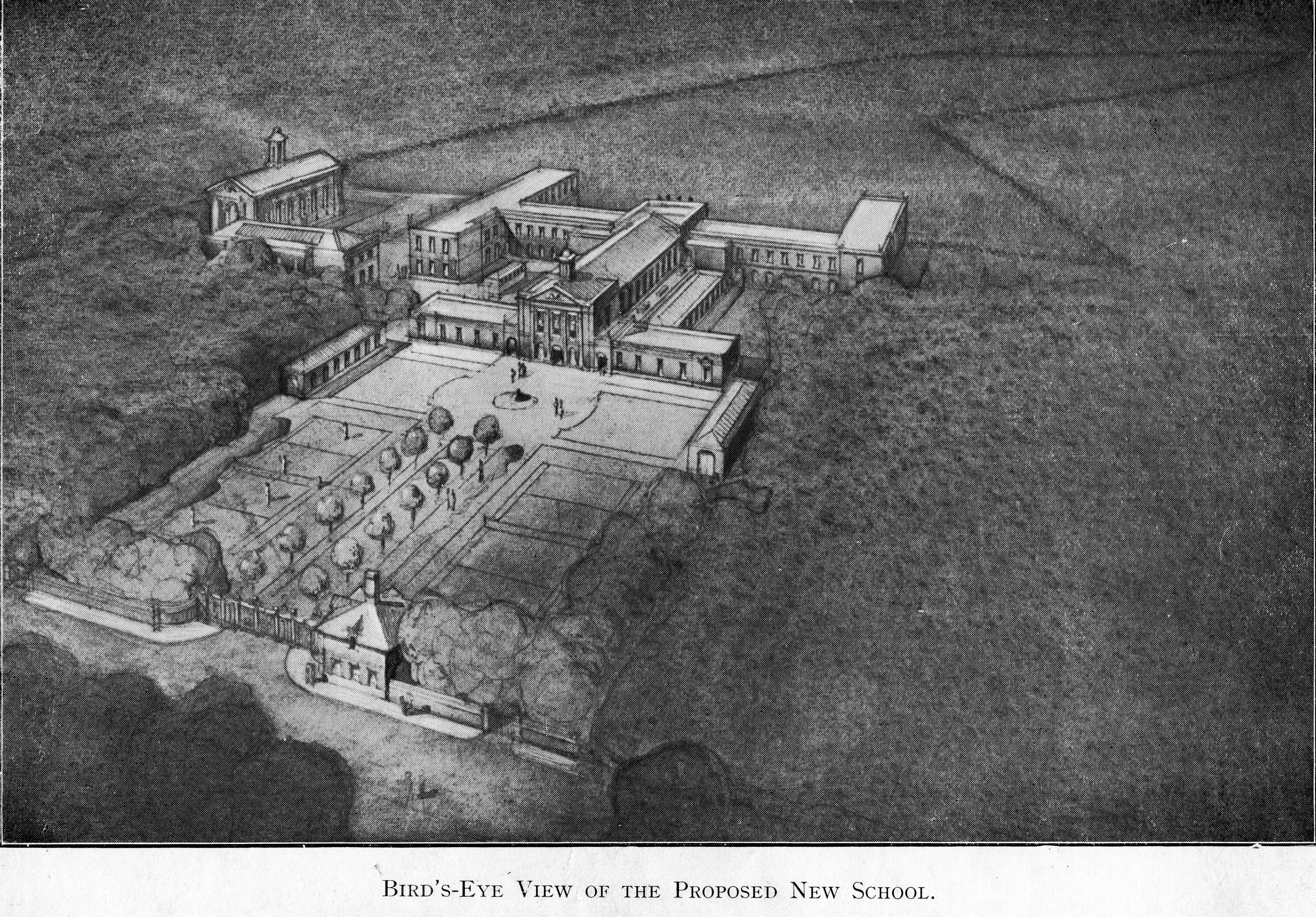
Architects impression of the new Boteler Grammar School (1924)

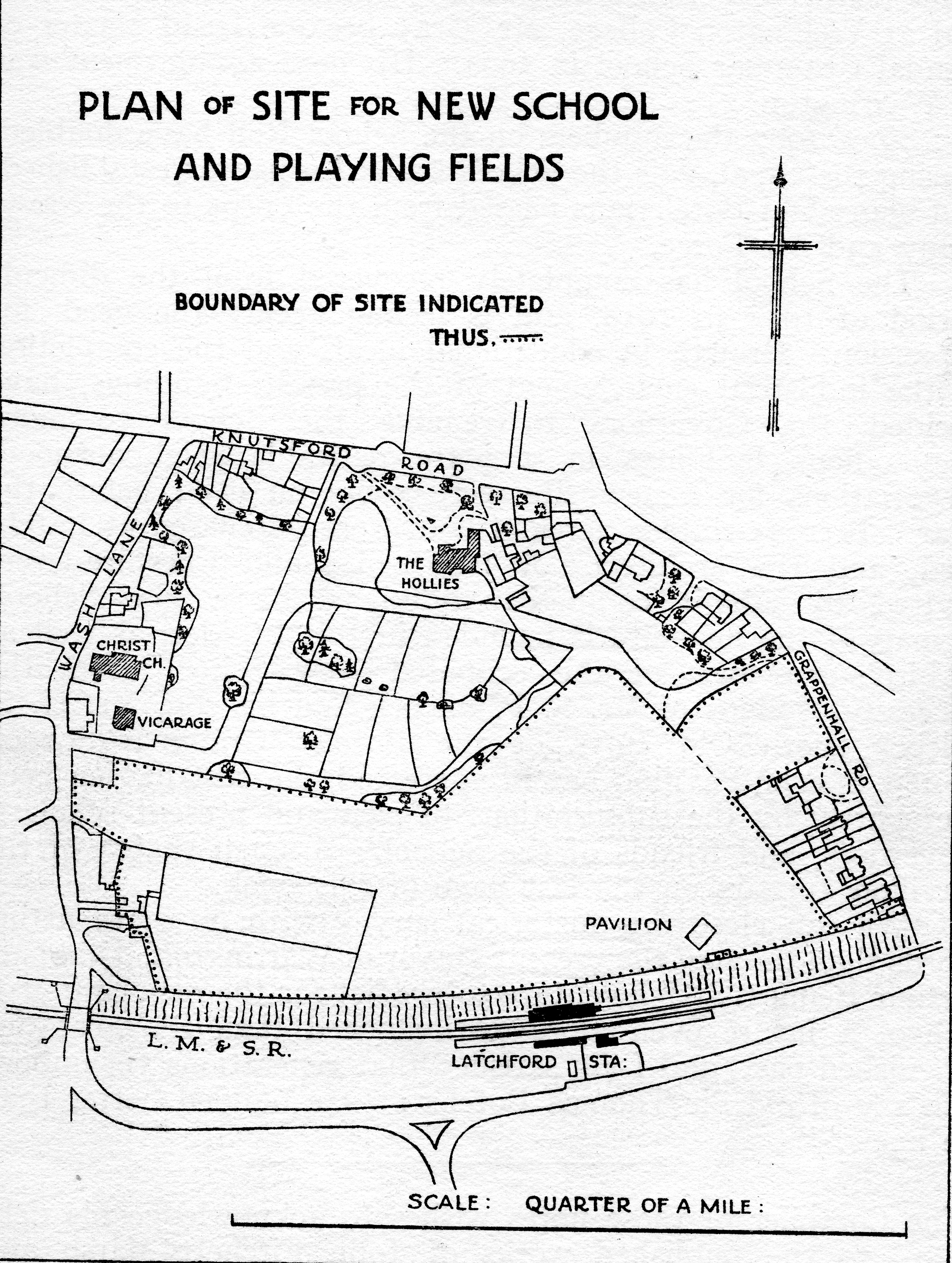
Plan of the new Boteler Grammar School (1924)

During the first quarter of the 20th century the number of pupils doubled and the building on School Brow became encircled by local industries making an expansion of the school difficult. The Governors decided to remove the school to more commodious buildings in a more desirable neighbourhood. In 1924 sixteen acres of land were purchased at Latchford and the architects S.P. Silcock and H.S. Silcock (both Old Boys) designed the New School.

By the 1930s, the Boteler school educated girls as well as boys. The new boys' school buildings opened officially the 16 September 1940 on the school's current site, while the girls remained at the town centre site. They were later moved to a new High School for Girls, on a site now occupied by Priestley College.

The opening of the new school 1940 was not marked by a commemorative plaque, due to the war conditions. However, twenty years later, the 13 May 1960, this was rectified and the plaque in the wall of the entrance hall was unveiled by Canon E. Downham.

From April 1974 the school at Latchford was administered by Cheshire County Council's Education Committee.

==== Head-masters of Boteler Grammar School ====
1526–1576 ?	"Sir" Richard Taylor	Degree in Canon Law, Oxford, 1506; Bachelor of Divinity, 1521; occupying School-house, 1524; Rector of Lymm, 1565
1576 ?–1605	John Wakefield	At Oxford in 1572; died and buried in Warrington, 1605.
1605–1620	Robert Martin B.A.	Brasenose college, Oxford, 1602; resigned and became minister at Aston, 1620; died 1646.
1620 ?–1673	Nathan Ashworth B.A.	Brasenose college, Oxford, 1609; held Nowell Scholarship; died aged 84 in 1673.
1673–1679	John Wright	Brasenose college, Oxford, 1634; died aged 61 in 1679.
1680 ?–1683 ?	J. Clayton	
1683 ?–1686	Joseph Willott M.A..	Jesus college, Cambridge, 1677; M.A. 1681; died at the age of 32 in 1686
1687–1718	Samuel Shaw M.A.	Master at Wigan, 1676–1686; rector in 1691; Prebendary of Chester; died 1718
1718–1719	John Tatlock	
1720–1757	Thomas Hayward M.A.	Born in Warrington, 1695; B.A. Brasenose college Oxford, 1716; M.A. 1719; Vicar of Garstang, 1722–1731; died 1757
1757–1807	Edward Owen M.A.	Born in Montgomeryshire, 1728; B.A. Jesus college, Oxford, 1749; M.A., 1752; previously Usher at Crosby; Rector in 1767; died 1807.
1807–1814	Robert Atherton Rawstorne, M.A.	Brasenose college, Oxford, 1803; Became Master and Rector at the same time; deprived of Mastership in 1814 by Court of Chancery; Rector till 1832; died near Preston, 1852
1815–1828	William Bordman M.A.	Pembroke college, Oxford, 1801; came from Reading as Usher in 1808; requested to resign in 1828; died at Honfleur, France, 1846.
1828–1842	Thomas Vere Bayne M.A.	Born at Oxford, 1803; Scholar and M.A. of Jesus college, Oxford; new school built, 1829; helped to found National School, 1833; resigned in 1842; died at Broughton, 1848.
1842–1861	Henry Bostock M.A.	Born Newcastle-under-Lyme; M.A. Wadham college, Oxford; previously Master of Aylesbury; asked to resign, 1861; died at Southport, 1863
1863–1881	Offley Henry Cary M.A.	Educated at Rugby; M.A. Christ Church, Oxford; School rebuilt just before he came; resigned in 1881; died at Trusham, Devon, 1919.
1881–1907	Edward John Willcocks M.A.	Saint Catharine's college, Cambridge; second master here, 1879; previously at Cheam, Surrey; moved from School-house to Latchford in 1905; died in 1907.
1907–1932	Horace Gray M.A.	Educated at Perse school and Jesus college, Cambridge; B.A. 1896, M.A. 1900; Cricket "blue", 1894; taught at Westward Ho !, Ipswich, Wellington; Head at Kendal, 1904–1907.
1932–1940	Evan Price Evans	
1940–1950	Nathaniel Clapton M.A.	Educated at Royal Grammar School Worcester and Hertford College, Oxford; M.A. 1925
1951–1973	Peter Martin Jackson M.A.	Educated at Perse school and Emmanuel college, Cambridge; Athletics "blue"
1973–1981	Robert James English	
1981–1983	Eric Percival, M.A.	

=== Comprehensive ===
The school became a mixed comprehensive in 1983, as Victoria Park Secondary Modern School. The former Richard Fairclough High School was merged with the school at the same time.

The sixth form moved all the pupils to the new Priestley College in the autumn of 1979. This was the same term that the first mixed comprehensive pupils started to be admitted. The remaining 4 years of grammar school pupils continued until they left after their 5th year at the school. Autumn 1983 was the first term with no more of the original grammar school pupils remaining and so the school was fully comprehensive from then on.

In 2002 it became Warrington's only Church of England school.

=== Academy ===
Previously a voluntary aided school administered by Warrington Borough Council, in June 2017 Sir Thomas Boteler Church of England High School converted to academy status. The school is now sponsored by the Challenge Academy Trust.

== Admissions ==
The present-day school is for both sexes between the ages of 11 and 16, with no sixth form. It has a Christian ethos and serves the local area of Latchford. It lies just off the A5061 in Knutsford Road, near the railway and the Manchester Ship Canal.

== Academic performance ==
	2022	2023	2024
Progress 8 benchmark	-0.13	-0.27	-0.24
Attainment 8	43.12	40.01	41.5
Grade 5+ in both English and maths GCSE	37%	30%	30%
English Baccalaureate average point score	3.69	3.41	3.53
English Baccalaureate % entry	45%	44%	65%

== Notable former pupils ==
- Steven Arnold, played Ashley Peacock in Coronation Street

=== Boteler Grammar School ===
- Thomas Alcock (1709–1798), a clergyman in the Church of England, a pluralist and an author.
- David Banks, Editor of the Daily Mirror from 1992 to 1994, and former radio presenter
- Sir Lindor Brown CBE (1903–1971), Waynflete Professor of Physiology at the University of Oxford from 1960 to 1967, principal of Hertford College, Oxford, from 1967 to 1971, president of ASLIB from 1961 to 1963, and president of the International Union of Physiological Sciences from 1962 to 1968
- Paul Cullen, rugby league player for Warrington Wolves attended the school 1974–1979.
- Prof Michael Driscoll, Vice-Chancellor since 1996 of Middlesex University
- George Duckworth (1901–1966), cricketer
- Chris Evans, radio and television presenter
- Geoffrey Hewitt (1934–2019), chemical engineer
- John Fitchett Marsh (24 October 1818 – 24 June 1880) was an English solicitor, official and antiquary.
- Thomas Percival (1740–1804), invented medical ethics
- Thomas Risley (1630–1716), minister
- Peter Rylands (1820–1887), Liberal MP from 1868 to 1874 for Warrington, and from 1876 to 1887 for Burnley
- George Tierney (1761–1830) (briefly), MP and Leader from 1818 to 1821 of the Whig Party
- Hamlet Winstanley (1698–1756), painter
