= Michael Fitchett =

Michael Fitchett may refer to:

- Michael Fitchett (Australian sportsman) (1927–2021), Australian former professional cricketer and Australian rules football player
- Michael Fitchett (basketball) (born 1982), New Zealand former professional basketball player
