= John Fitchett Marsh =

John Fitchett Marsh (24 October 1818 – 24 June 1880) was an English solicitor, official and antiquary.

== Life ==
Marsh was the son of a solicitor at Wigan, Lancashire, where he was born on 24 October 1818. He was educated at Warrington grammar school under Thomas Vere Bayne. On the death of his father, his guardian was his uncle John Fitchett, and Marsh later succeeded to his business as a solicitor.

On the incorporation of Warrington in 1847 Marsh was appointed town-clerk, and held the office until 1858. He was instrumental in establishing the Warrington School of Art, and the Public Museum and Library. The Warrington Town Library was municipally funded from 1848, the first library in the country to be supported in that fashion by local government, and Marsh is credited with the innovation. Marsh was also one of the major benefactors of the Museum at its foundation, with William Beamont, James Kendrick and William Robson.

Marsh moved in 1873 to Hardwick House, Chepstow, Monmouthshire, and planned a history of the castles of the county. He died, unmarried, on 24 June 1880. His large library, which included that of his uncle John Fitchett, was sold at Sotheby's in May 1882.

== Works ==
Marsh contributed papers to the Chetham Society, and in 1855 delivered a series of lectures on the "Literary History of Warrington during the Eighteenth Century", which were published in a volume of Warrington Mechanics' Institution Lectures. In the same year he published a lecture on the "Parthenon and the Elgin Marbles". His Annals of Chepstow Castle were edited by Sir John Maclean, and printed at Exeter in 1883.

== Notes ==
Attribution

This article incorporates text from a publication now in the public domain: Lee, Sidney, ed. (1893). "Marsh, John Fitchett". Dictionary of National Biography. Vol. 36. London: Smith, Elder & Co.
