= Edward Owen (translator) =

Welsh Anglican priest, headmaster and translator

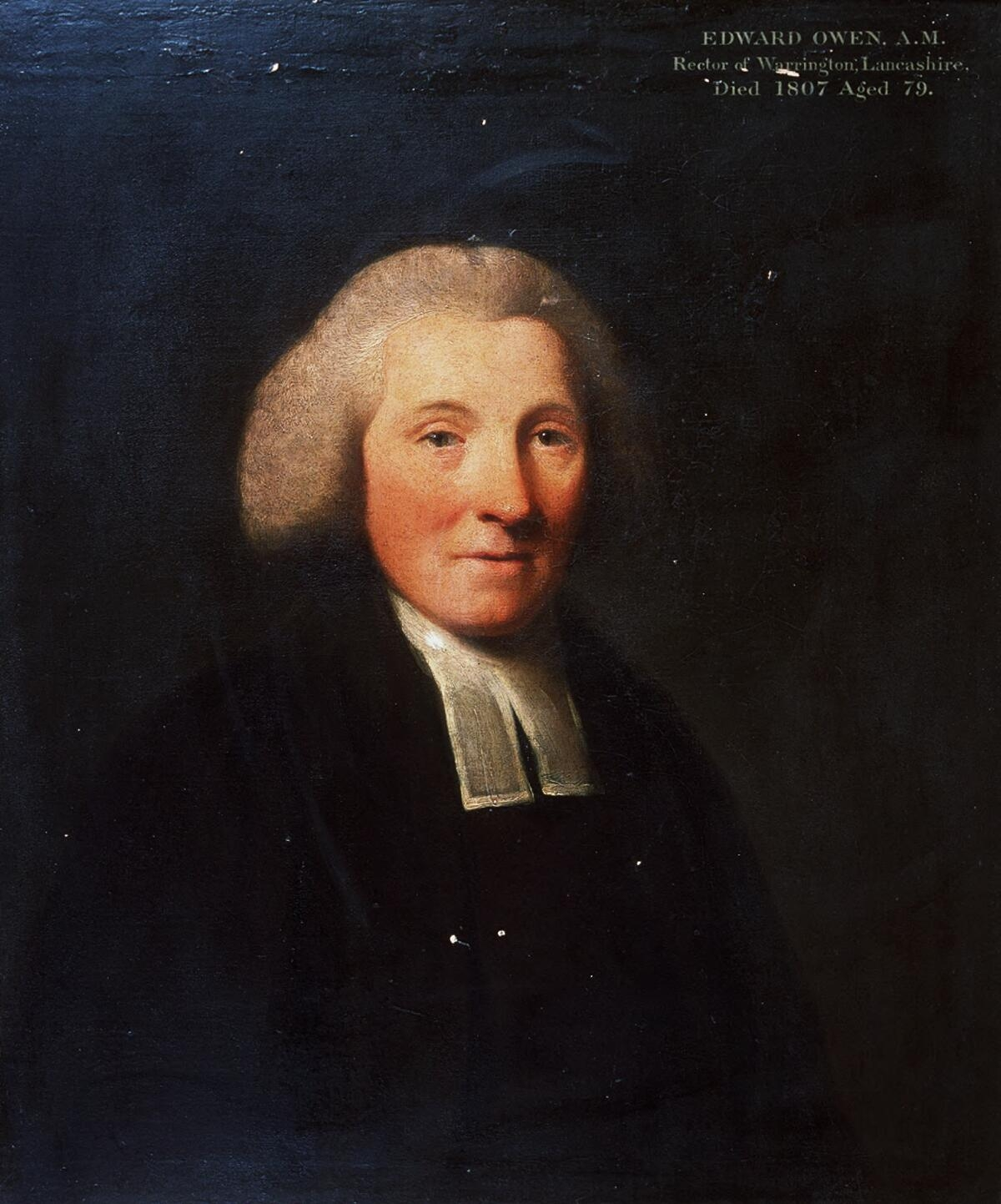
Edward Owen

Edward Owen (1728 or 1729 – April 1807) was a Welsh Anglican priest, headmaster and translator.

== Life ==
Owen was born in 1728 or 1729 (since he was noted to be 17 years old when he matriculated at Jesus College, Oxford in March 1746). His father was from Llangurig, Montgomeryshire, Wales. After obtaining his Bachelor of Arts degree in 1749 and his Master of Arts degree in 1752, Owen became headmaster of Warrington grammar school in 1757 and rector of Warrington in 1767. He remained rector until his death in 1807 and was held in high regard in the area, both as schoolmaster and priest. The scholar Gilbert Wakefield described him as "a man of most elegant learning, unimpeachable veracity, and peculiar benevolance of heart."

Owen's main work was a translation of Juvenal's Satires, "cleared of all the most exceptionable passages" (1785, reprinted in 1786 with a translation of works by the Roman poet Persius). The work was not successful. He also published textbooks on Latin grammar and metre.
