= Nathaniel L. Clapton =

British headmaster (1903–67)

Nathaniel Langford Clapton (1 September 1903 – 23 January 1967), the only son of Nathaniel Clapton, manager of a ironmonger business, of St Dunstan's Crescent, Worcester, was a schoolmaster and grammar school headmaster.

He attended the Royal Grammar School Worcester, before gaining a scholarship to Hertford College, Oxford, where he gained first class honours in Mathematical Moderations in 1923 and in the Final Honour School of Mathematics in 1925.

He was successively senior mathematics master at Watford Grammar School for Boys and The Glasgow Academy.

In September 1940 he became headmaster of Boteler Grammar School, Warrington,. He was described by a former pupil as "a brute - Wackford Squeers of Dotheboys Hall reincarnated. He had a 'double first' from Oxford (first-class honours in two subjects). His Boteler reputation was he had 'a double first in sadism'". In his next school in Sheffield, Clapton himself recorded that there were 2,131 official canings during the fifteen years that he was in post.

In 1950 he was appointed headmaster of King Edward VII School, Sheffield, a grammar school in the city, sending many pupils to Oxford and Cambridge universities. His time there has been seen in different ways:

During Clapton's period as Headmaster, the more he believed the school was successful the more criticism, if not downright hostility, it attracted ... Others argued that the school's priority was to create a conveyor belt from the First Year Forms to Oxbridge for the able pupils and ignore the educational requirements of the less successful pupils, all of whom had not only been successful in the 11+ examination, but had gained a high place in the merit table. Clapton dismissed these assumptions, arguing that what he aimed to construct was a school environment where a very able group of pupils were given the opportunity to work to their maximum potential and gain the highest academic awards. He was in no doubt that the pinnacle of these honours was to gain entry to Oxford or Cambridge

The 2005 history of the school describes him as "Unloved, but respected as fair and highly competent by most of the boys at the school — although there are a sizeable number even today whose dislike of him is still strong and unabated". He retired on health grounds in July 1965 and died in January 1967. He was married, his wife having died in 1956, and had two children.
