= John Fitchett (poet) =

Poet

John Fitchett (21 September 1776 – 20 October 1838) was an English poet.

== Early life and education ==
Fitchett was the son of a wine merchant at Liverpool. His parents both died before he reached the age of ten, and Fitchett was moved to Warrington by his guardian Mr. Kerfoot, and placed at the Warrington Grammar School under the Rev. Edward Owen.

== Career ==
In 1793 he was articled to his guardian, and in due time, having been admitted an attorney, was taken into partnership with him, subsequently attaining a high place in his profession.

Fitchett died unmarried at Warrington on 20 October 1838, and was buried at Winwick Church. His library was left to his nephew John Fitchett Marsh, and was later sold after his death, at Sotheby's, London, 12–13 May 1882.

== Works ==
His first published work, Bewsey, a Poem, written at the age of eighteen, had considerable success. He wrote many fugitive pieces, which were collected and printed at Warrington in 1836, under the title of Minor Poems, composed at various Times.

=== King Alfred ===
The epic poem King Alfred was Fitchett's major life's work. He spent forty years researching and writing it. It was printed at Warrington for private circulation at intervals between 1808 and 1834, in five quarto volumes. It was cast in the form of a romantic epic poem, the subject being the life and times of King Alfred. He did not live to finish the work, but he left money for printing a new edition, and the work of supervising it was undertaken by his friend Robert Roscoe. Roscoe completed the poem, adding 2,585 lines, making it the longest poem written in English so far. The entire work contains more than 130,000 lines.

== See also ==
- King Alfred (poem)
