= Geoffrey Hewitt =

British chemical engineer (1934–2019)

Geoffrey Hewitt FRS FREng FRSC FIChemE FIMechE

Courtaulds Professor of Chemical Engineering, Imperial College of Science, Technology and Medicine
- In office 1993–1999

Professor of Chemical Engineering, Imperial College of Science, Technology and Medicine
- In office 1985–1993

Personal details
- Born: Geoffrey Frederick Hewitt; 3 January 1934
- Died: 18 January 2019 (aged 85)

Geoffrey Frederick Hewitt FRS (3 January 1934 – 18 January 2019) was a British chemical engineer, and Emeritus Professor at Imperial College London, where from 1993 to 1999 he was the Courtaulds Professor of chemical engineering.

== Life ==
Hewitt attended Boteler Grammar School, Warrington and earned a BSc Tech in chemical engineering at the University of Manchester Institute of Science and Technology followed by a PhD in the same in 1957. He worked for the United Kingdom Atomic Energy Authority until 1985 when he joined the Department of Chemical Engineering at Imperial College London, being made Courtaulds Professor of chemical engineering in 1993 and Emeritus Professor in 1999 till his death.

He died 18 January 2019.

== Honours ==
Hewitt received honorary degrees from the University of Louvain (1988), and Heriot Watt University (1995). He was elected a Fellow of the Royal Academy of Engineering in 1984, and became a Fellow of the Royal Society in 1989, In 2007 Professor Hewitt was awarded the Global Energy Prize by Vladimir Putin. He was President of the IChemE for 1989–1990 and received its M. M. Sharma Medal for his contributions in 2017.

== Works ==
- Encyclopedia of Heat and Mass Transfer, Hemisphere Publ. Corp., 1986, ISBN 978-0-89116-332-9
- Introduction to Nuclear Power, Taylor & Francis, 1 March 1987, ISBN 978-1-56032-682-3
