= Thomas Risley =

Reverend Thomas Risley (27 August 1630 – 1716) was an English Presbyterian minister, founder of the Thomas Risley Chapel.

== Early life ==
Thomas Risley was born on 27 August 1630, the second son of Thomas Risley and Thomasin Lathon Risley and christened at Newchurch, Kenyon, Cheshire on 2 September 1630. He was educated at Boteler Grammar School, Warrington under Mr Nathan Ashworth and, in 1649, went to Pembroke College, Oxford where his elder brother John had graduated before becoming a fellow of New College, Oxford. Calamy describes his life at the university: "he passed his time as a recluse... he aimed at acquiring useful knowledge and learning rather than fame."

== Oxford University fellowship ==
After the restoration of Charles II of England in May 1660, Royal visitors were sent to the university to enquire into matters. Thomas Risley evidently satisfied the enquiry and was confirmed in his fellowship and the following instrument drawn up in his favour –"We, having received sufficient testimony of the honest life and conversation of Thomas Risley MA, as also of his diligence in his studies, his progress and sufficiency in learning of England, the government of this University, and the statutes of College wherein he lives, do by these presents, ratify, allow and confirm the said Mr T Risley in his fellowship with all rights, dues and prerequisites thereunto belonging, notwithstanding any nullities, irregularities or imperfections which in strict interpretation of the said statutes may be objected." Dated 20 June 1661.

Thomas Risley held his fellowship until 24 August 1662 when he was obliged to surrender because he would not comply with the Act of Uniformity 1662. The college however, because of their respect for him, and because they were unwilling to lose so valuable a member, allowed him a year to consider his position. During this time, "he examined the terms of conformity with great diligence and impartiality, that he might be able to satisfy others as well as his own conscience and he was not carried away by the prejudices of education".

On 10 November 1662 he was ordained deacon and priest by the bishop of Norwich, Dr Edward Reynolds, who in his certificate gave him a very honourable character.

One of the provisions of the Act of Uniformity 1662 was that no-one could be a minister in the Church of England unless he had been ordained by a bishop, so, at this stage, he was clearly uncertain about his rejection of the act, although Reynolds, having himself been a Presbyterian, was clearly sympathetic to Risley's views.

Thomas Risley's episcopalian ordination raises the important point of his assent to the Book of Common Prayer. The Thirty-Nine Articles of Religion contained in it were not changed at all when the Prayer Book was revised in 1661. Article Thirty-six assumes episcopal ordination as the normal mode, whether it is in the form contained in the prayer book of Edward VIor the form as in the book as revised in 1661. So far as can be seen, Risley could have had any theological objection to the Prayer Book, as he did in fact accept if from Reynolds. That he approved and valued the thirty-nine articles is certain because a stipulation was inserted in the deed of conveyance of the ground on which the Risley Chapel stood, namely "that the Minister of the Chapel shall subscribe to the Thirty-Nine Articles".

== Life after Oxford ==
Edmund Calamy wrote of Risley that, despite his long period of deliberation, "he could not, for any place, be satisfied to come up to the conditions prescribed by the Act. He retired, therefore, to his estate in the country, where, during the storm of persecution, he employed himself in preaching privately to such as scrupled conformity, and in visiting the sick, for whose sake he applied himself to the study of physic; by the practice of which he more effectually engaged their attention when he administered to their spiritual advice."

About four years after he left Oxford for Lancashire, the Vice-Chancellor of the university wrote to him, pressing him to return and offering preferment to encourage his conformity, but his conscience would not let him.

The Royal Declaration of Indulgence of 1672 had allowed Protestant Dissenters the right of public worship, but when it was later withdrawn and the Conventicle Act again imposed, a number of Croft and Risley Nonconformists were brought before the Bishop, and amongst them was Thomas Risley. "Thomas Risley, of Woolston-cum-Poulton, Gent. Fined £5. This gentleman is one that saith they will not desist".

With the passing of the Toleration Act in 1689, his neighbours, who had previously been his clandestine congregation, resolved themselves into a regular society and "committed themselves to his pastoral conduct, and he was very useful among them by his ministerial performances and exemplary life and conversation."

The Toleration Act also decreed the licensing of meeting houses, an arrangement which was accepted without complaint as it placed the building and congregation under the protection of the State. Property given for religious uses was secured by trust deed, and the "dissenting interest," as it was then called, had legal recognition. Ministers, duly licensed and sworn, were made exempt from many services to which laymen were subject. A list of licensed "chappells" in South West Lancashire has survived and amongst them is Richard Jackson's barn in Culcheth, for which Thomas Risley held the licence. Local tradition has it that, prior to the licence, "conventicles" were held in a field near to the site of the later Chapel.

It appears that at the time of the founding of the Risley Presbyterian Church there was a very strong Presbyterian influence in the Warrington area. References in the Quarter Sessions records state for example, that the house of Francis Turner was registered on 23 January 1706/7 as a Presbyterian place of worship, as was that of John Bent on 24 April 1710, both at Warrington.

At some point in his life Thomas Risley married a woman by the name of Catherine.

With a growing congregation, and active participation in ecclesiastical life in Lancashire and northern Cheshire, the more settled state of the country after the turn of the century led Thomas Risley and his congregation to the decision to erect a permanent chapel. Thomas Risley died in 1716. at the age of 86, and was buried in Risley Chapel graveyard. His tombstone still exists, but the original inscription became obliterated by weathering. A later minister. the Reverend William Dunn, who took a great interest in preserving relics of the early history of the chapel, placed upon the tombstone the following inscription:

Here interred the body of the Rev Thomas Risley MA Oxford. He left the Church of England in 1662, and built Risley Chapel in 1707, where he officiated up to his death. He died in 1716, aged 86 years. "The righteous shall be in everlasting remembrance" Psalm cxii, 6.

Thomas Risley's funeral sermon was preached by his friend Dr Charles Owen of Warrington, from the text 2 Kings 2:12. This was afterwards printed, together with brief "Memoirs of his life." Thomas Risley did not contribute much to literature; the only work known to exist is "The Cursed Family; a treatise on the evil of neglecting family prayer." The celebrated John Howe wrote a preface to it. in which he gave some account of the author. Thomas Risley left at least two sons, Thomas and John. John Risley was born 19 January 1690, educated at Glasgow, and succeeded his father in the Ministry at Risley Chapel.
