= King Alfred (poem) =

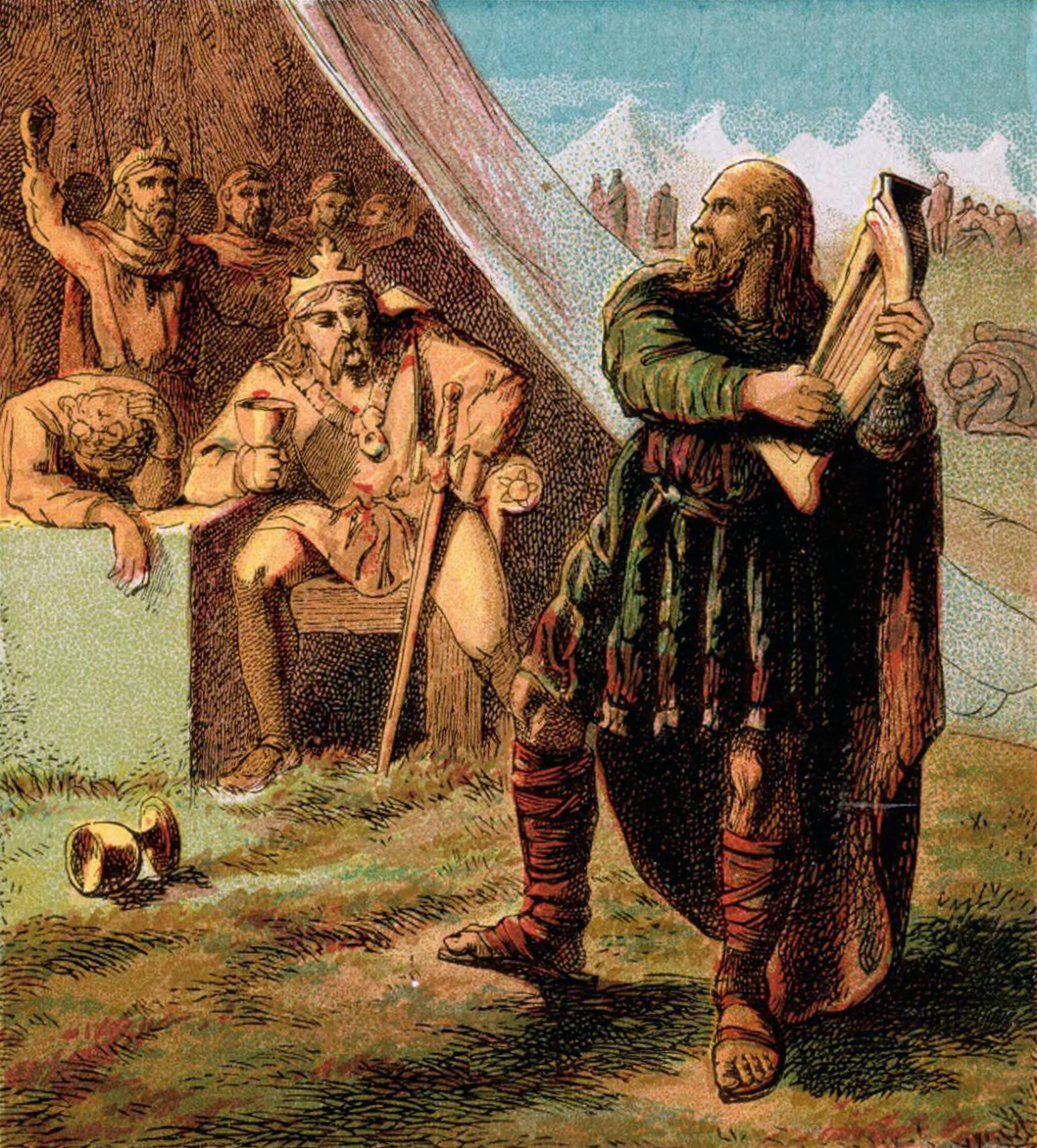
King Alfred infiltrates the Danish Camp

King Alfred is an epic poem by John Fitchett (died 1838) and completed by Robert Roscoe, published in 1841 and 1842. It is currently the longest English poem.

== Overview ==
The poem narrates—in dramatic terms—King Alfred's ongoing battles against the Danes. Supernatural powers intervene to aid both sides: the Archangel Michael and his hosts—on behalf of the English—and Lucifer and his hosts—on behalf of the Danes.

- Can King Alfred—although beaten—engineer a successful military comeback against overwhelming odds?
- Will the remaining Danes—inured to warfare from their youth—ever be able to peaceably co-exist with other races upon English soil?

== History ==
The great work of John Fitchett's life was one which occupied his leisure hours for forty years, and in the composition of which he bestowed unwearied industry and acute research. It was printed at Warrington for private circulation at intervals between 1808 and 1834, in five quarto volumes. It was cast in the form of a romantic epic poem, the subject being the life and times of King Alfred, including, in addition to a biography of Alfred, an epitome of the antiquities, topography, religion, and civil and religious condition of the country. He rewrote part of the work, but did not live to finish it. He left money for printing a new edition, and the work of supervising it was undertaken by his pupil, clerk, and friend, Robert Roscoe (son of William Roscoe), who completed the task by adding 2,585 lines, the entire work containing more than 131,000 lines. This prodigious monument was published by Pickering in 1841–2, in six volumes, 8vo, with the title of 'King Alfred, a Poem.'
