= Horace Gray (cricketer) =

English cricketer, educator, and clergyman

Personal information
- Full name: Horace Gray
- Born: 29 November 1874; Chesterton, Cambridgeshire, England
- Died: 21 January 1938 (aged 63); Bredfield, Suffolk, England
- Batting: Right-handed
- Bowling: Right-arm fast

Domestic team information
- Years: Team
- 1894–1896: Cambridge University
- 1895–1906: Cambridgeshire

Career statistics
Competition	First-class
Matches	18
Runs scored	97
Batting average	6.06
100s/50s	–/–
Top score	10
Balls bowled	3,525
Wickets	89
Bowling average	22.76
5 wickets in innings	8
10 wickets in match	1
Best bowling	7/48
Catches/stumpings	6/–
- Source: Cricinfo, 21 July 2019

Horace Gray (29 November 1874 – 21 January 1938) was an English first-class cricketer, educator and clergyman.

The son of William Wythers Gray, he was born in the Cambridge suburb of Chesterton. He was educated in Cambridge at The Perse School, before going up to Jesus College, Cambridge. While at Cambridge, he made his debut in first-class cricket for Cambridge University against A. J. Webbe's XI at Fenner's in 1894. He played first-class cricket for Cambridge from 1894–96, making eighteen appearances. Playing as a right-arm fast bowler, he took 89 wickets at a bowling average of 22.76, with best figures of 7 for 48. He took a five wicket haul on eight occasions, and once took ten wickets in a match. His most prolific season came in 1895, when he took 37 wickets at an average of 25.02. He gained a blue in cricket while at Cambridge. In addition to playing first-class cricket, Gray also played minor counties cricket for Cambridgeshire from 1895–1906, albeit intermittently, making 33 appearances.

After graduating from Cambridge, he became an Anglican clergyman and schoolteacher. He was an assistant master at the United Services College at Westward Ho! from 1896–98. He was ordained as a deacon in Exeter in 1898 and served as a priest at Littleham from 1898–1901. He moved to Ipswich School, where was an assistant master from 1901–02, before undertaking the same role at Wellington College from 1903–04. He was the headmaster of Kendal Grammar School from 1904–07, before serving as the headmaster of Warrington Grammar School until 1932. He later served as the reverend of Bredfield with Boulge from 1932–38, and Lowdham with Pettistree from 1934–38. He was found dead in the study of his home at Bredfield in January 1938.
