= James Kendrick =

English physician and antiquarian (1809–82)

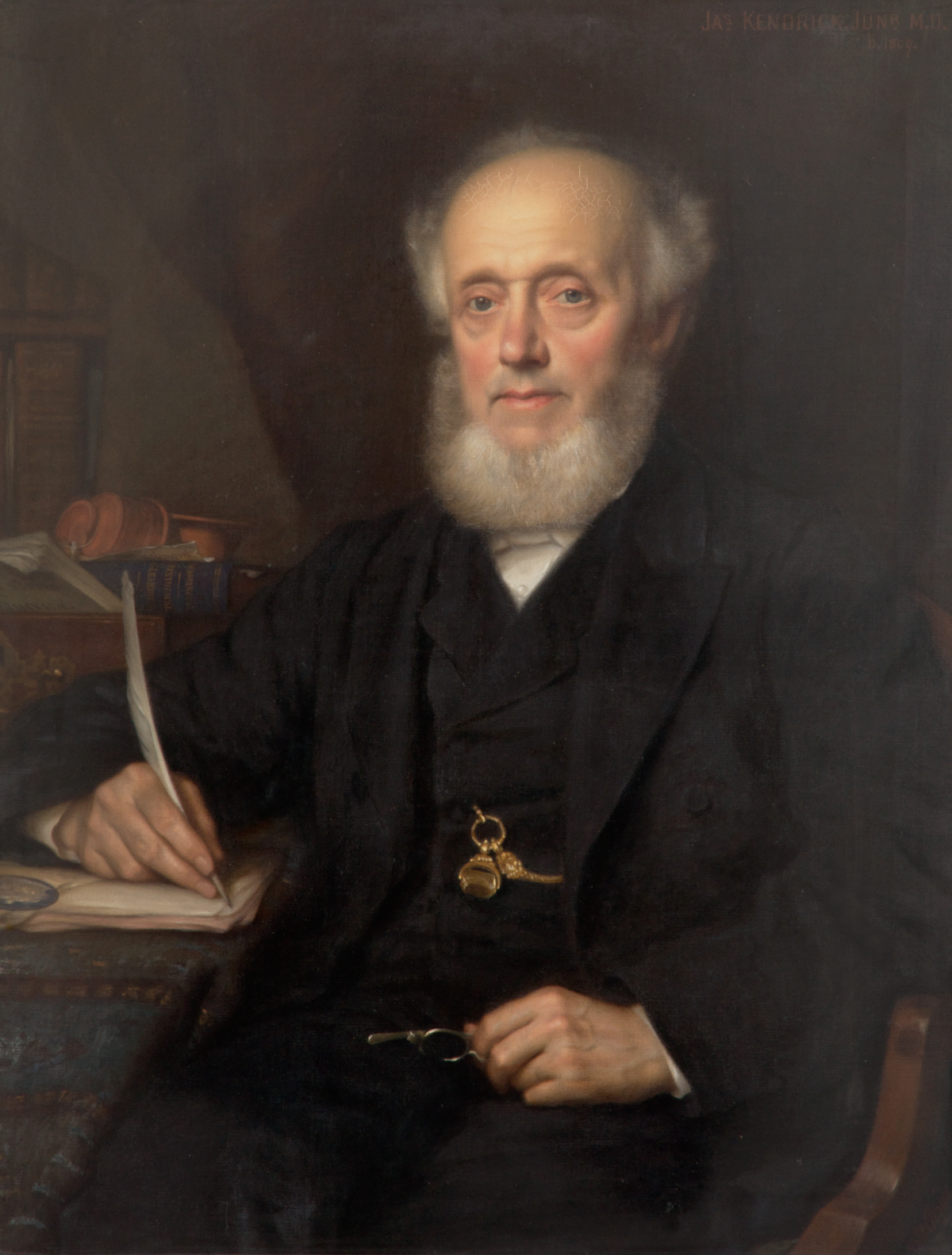
James Kendrick

James Kendrick (1809-1882) was an English physician and antiquary.

== Life ==
Born in Warrington, which then was in Lancashire, on 7 November 1809, he was the son of the physician James Kendrick (1771–1847). He graduated M.D. at Edinburgh on 1 August 1833, and then built up a large medical practice in Warrington.

Kendrick frequently lectured on local topography and history. In 1853 he became a member of the British Archæological Association. In 1859 he took charge of the antiquities in the Warrington Museum, and added to the collection. He forwarded the excavations at the Roman station at Wilderspool, near Warrington, which (with Dr. Robson) he thought might be the Condate of Antonine.

Kendrick had the idea to provide work and assistance for itinerant labourers by providing stone benches on which they could rest while travelling. Around 30 were installed between Liverpool and Manchester in the 1860s and around 12 still survive. Several now have Grade II listed status.

Kendrick died at Warrington 6 April 1882.

== Legacy ==
Kendrick gave the Museum remains discovered at Wilderspool. After his death, his daughter also handed over to the museum his collection of ecclesiastical and medieval seals and his bequest of one hundred volumes. He gave more than three hundred books bearing a Warrington imprint to the public library.

== Works ==
Kendrick wrote the following books:

- An Account of Excavations made at the Mote Hill, Warrington, Liverpool, 1853.
- Kendrick, James (1853). Profiles of Warrington Worthies. Longman, Brown, Green & Longman., illustrated with silhouette likenesses.
- Account of the Loyal Warrington Volunteers of 1798, 1856.
- Guide Book to the Warrington Museum, 1872.

Papers by Kendrick appeared in the publications of the Historic Society of Lancashire and Cheshire, Chester Archæological Society, The Reliquary, and Warrington Guardian. A memoir of him in the Palatine Note-Book (ii. 113–16, 179–80) gives a list of his writings, including contributions to newspapers and antiquarian periodicals.

== Family ==
Kendrick was married three times.

== Notes ==
Attribution

This article incorporates text from a publication now in the public domain: Lee, Sidney, ed. (1892). "Kendrick, James". Dictionary of National Biography. Vol. 30. London: Smith, Elder & Co.
