= Old Orchard Beach Inn =

Historic inn in Maine, United States

- Staples Inn
- U.S. National Register of Historic Places
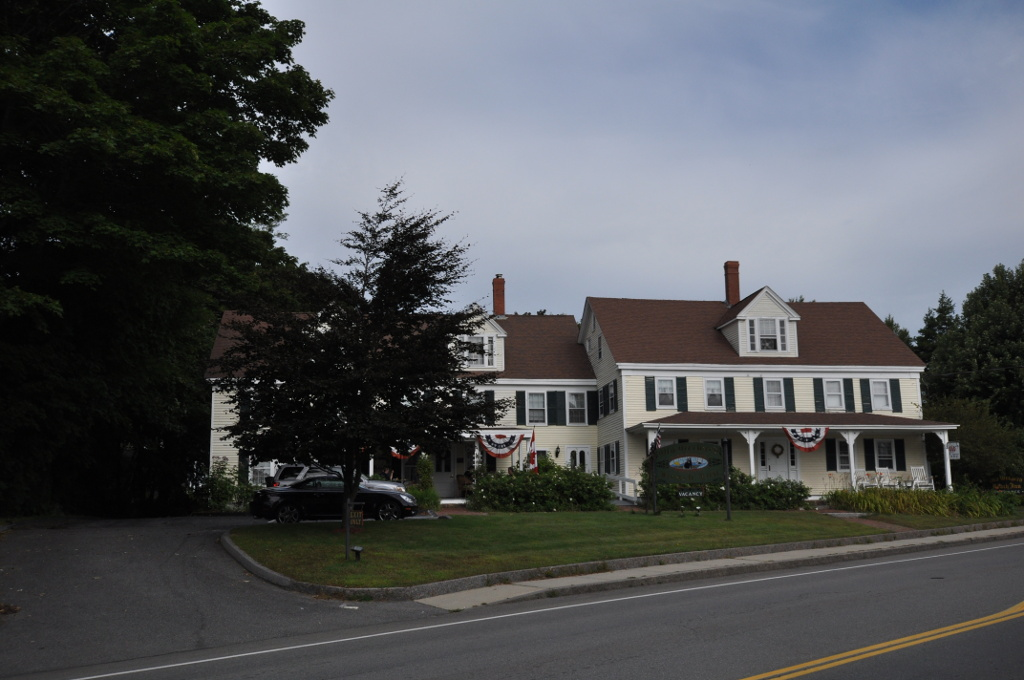

- Location within Maine Location within the United States
- Location: 6 Portland Ave., Old Orchard Beach, Maine
- Coordinates: 43°31′3″N 70°22′42″W
- Area: 0.5 acres (0.20 ha)
- Built: 1840
- NRHP reference No.: 86002422
- Added to NRHP: June 26, 1987

The Staples Inn, now the Old Orchard Beach Inn, is an historic travelers' accommodation at 8 Portland Avenue in Old Orchard Beach, Maine. Located in a building dating to the late 18th century, it is the oldest known property to have regularly had summer boarders, with a documented history of doing so dating to 1840. The building was listed on the National Register of Historic Places in 1987.

== Description and history ==
The Old Orchard Beach Inn is prominently located in the center of Old Orchard Beach, on the west side of Portland Avenue (Maine State Route 8), opposite the town hall. It is a 2 1/2-story wood-frame structure, with two large blocks, that on the left offset to the rear. Both have side-gable roofs and are finished in clapboard siding. The right block has a hip-roofed porch extending across its width, and both sections have gabled dormers projecting from the roof. The right block's interior includes 18th-century features such as a narrow winding staircase, low ceiling, and fireplace mantel.

The house's oldest portion was built sometime in the 18th century, possibly as early as 1730. Initially a one-story farmhouse, it was bought by Elisha Staples in 1790 and enlarged by raising the roof. About 1840 his grandson Ebenezer began taking on summer visitors, who began arriving in the area in larger numbers after railroad access to the area increased in the 1840s and 1850s. By the 1870s, the establishment was one of the largest in Old Orchard Beach, with 300 beds. Much of the complex, remarkably sparing the original farmhouse, was destroyed by fire in 1875. A new, larger hotel was built adjacent, that was demolished in the 20th century. The exterior of the surviving house, now the Old Orchard Beach Inn, is much as it might have appeared late in the 19th century, and its upstairs rooms appear as they might have been in the mid-19th century.

== See also ==
- National Register of Historic Places listings in York County, Maine
