= Michael Fitchett (Australian sportsman) =

Australian sportsman (1927–2021)

Personal information
- Full name: Michael King Fitchett
- Born: 30 November 1927; Hawthorn, Melbourne, Victoria, Australia
- Died: 1 April 2021 (aged 93); Brighton, Melbourne, Victoria, Australia
- Batting: Right-handed
- Bowling: Right-arm off-break

Domestic team information
- Years: Team
- 1950–1953: Victoria

Career statistics
Competition	FC
Matches	13
Runs scored	589
Batting average	32.72
100s/50s	1/3
Top score	108
Balls bowled	706
Wickets	9
Bowling average	40.66
5 wickets in innings	0
10 wickets in match	0
Best bowling	4/23
Catches/stumpings	7/–
- Source: Cricinfo, 25 July 2021

Michael Fitchett

Personal information
- Position: centre

Playing career
Years	Club	Games (Goals)
1946-1949	Old Scotch & VAFA Rep	80 (unknown)
1950-1952	Hawthorn	(s) 30 (14) (r) 20 (0)
1953	Sorrento	19 (unknown)

Career highlights
- 1953 Sorrento Premiers

Michael King Fitchett (30 November 1927 – 1 April 2021) was a sportsman who played first-class cricket for Victoria and Australian rules football with Hawthorn during the early 1950s.

Fitchett attended Scotch College, Melbourne. He played regularly for Victoria in the 1951/52 Sheffield Shield season and scored his only first-class hundred in an innings against Western Australia at Perth, his 108 coming from seventh position down the order. From his 13 first-class games he scored 589 runs at 32.72 and also took nine wickets. He captained Victoria in two matches. His football career lasted three Victorian Football League seasons from 1950 to 1952, playing 30 games and kicking 14 goals.

Fitchett was an outstanding golfer. Metropolitan Golf Club in Oakleigh South has his name on most honour boards as Mens & Mixed Champion, President and Life Member.

== See also ==
- List of Victoria first-class cricketers
