= NWRA =

NWRA may refer to:

- National Waste & Recycling Association
- National Wildlife Refuge Association
- National Women's Rowing Association; see Association for Intercollegiate Athletics for Women championships
- North West Racing Association, a snocross association in Canada
- North West Regional Assembly
- Northern and Western Regional Assembly; see Western Railway Corridor
