= List of Norman architecture in Cheshire =

The county of Cheshire contains some Norman architecture. As Nikolaus Pevsner and Edward Hubbard state, this is not much in comparison with other counties. What there is includes the following:

== Structures ==
Location	Structure	Details	Refs	Image
Barthomley	St Bertoline's Church	Blocked doorway		
Bruera	St Mary's Church	Chancel arch, south doorway		
Chester	Cathedral	North transept, northwest tower, north wall of nave		
Chester	Former monastic buildings	Undercroft, abbot's passage, chapel of St Anselm		
Chester	Chester Castle	Items in the chapel of St Mary, Castro		
Chester	St John the Baptist's Church	Much of the interior, ruins to the east		
Church Lawton	All Saints Church	Doorway		
Frodsham	St Laurence's Church	Arcade (part) and clerestory; carved masonry inside the tower		
Grappenhall	St Wilfrid's Church	Corbel table incorporated into the wall of the south aisle		
Middlewich	St Michael and All Angels Church	Fabric in the aisle arcades		
Neston	St Mary's and St Helen's Church	Masonry re-used in lower two storeys of the tower		
Prestbury	St Peter's Church	Free-standing chapel in the churchyard		
Runcorn	Norton Priory	Doorway, undercroft		
Shocklach	St Edith's Church	Small church		
Shotwick	St Michael's Church	Doorway		

== Furnishings ==
Location	Structure	Details	Refs	Image
Acton	St Mary's Church	Font		
Grappenhall	St Wilfrid's Church	Font		

== Other ==
Location	Structure	Details	Refs	Image
Acton	St Mary's Church	Free-standing carved stones		
Bunbury	St Boniface's Church	Free-standing carved stones		
Burton	St Nicholas' Church	Big, round scalloped capitals		
