= Barbara Mawer =

British biochemist and medical researcher

- Born: Elizabeth Barbara Entwistle; 6 March 1936; Blackburn, Lancashire
- Died: 7 March 2006 (aged 70); Manchester
- Education: University of Edinburgh
- Spouse(s): George Mawer (divorced); Clifford Gordon Taylor

Elizabeth Barbara Mawer (née Entwistle, 6 March 1936 – 7 March 2006) was a British biochemist and medical researcher. She was regarded as a "highly influential figure in the calcium homoeostasis field".

== Early life and education ==
Barbara Entwistle was born on 6 March 1939 in Blackburn to Thomas Entwistle, a teacher, and Gladys Mary Entwistle (née Cornall). She attended Blackburn High School and Queen Mary School in Lytham St Annes. She received a BSc in biochemistry from the University of Edinburgh in 1957. She stayed there to conduct research, supervised by Guy Marrian, and in 1961 received a PhD for her thesis entitled The metabolism of cholesterol in the animal body. From 1958 to 1963 she also worked as an assistant lecturer at Edinburgh.

== Scientific career ==
After taking a break from working in order to look after her young children, in 1967 Mawer became a research associate at the University of Manchester, studying vitamin D and metabolic bone disease with William Stanbury. Together they were among the first to demonstrate why patients with renal disease are deficient in calcium – namely, they cannot produce calcitriol. Mawer was promoted to senior research fellow in 1974, and she became a "North West Regional Health Authority senior research fellow" in 1983. Stanbury retired that year, and when Mawer applied to the Medical Research Council for funding, they claimed not to know her, as previously Stanbury had received the funding. However, she would later succeed in receiving, with her colleague Mike Davies, funding of almost one million pounds per year to research the metabolism of vitamin D. They discovered that calcitriol receptors are found throughout the body, and Mawer worked on developing assays for vitamin D metabolites, for which she became well known. She was appointed as a reader in medicine in 1993 before being made Professor of Bone and Mineral Metabolism in 1995. She retired from Manchester in 2001.

Mawer was president of the Bone and Tooth Society (now the Bone Research Society) from 1992 to 1994; she had previously served as secretary. Not long before her death the Society established a fellowship to assist its members undertaking research. Mawer was among the founders of Manchester's Bone Disease Research Centre and served as its deputy director from its inception in 1994 until 1997.

== Politics ==
Mawer took part in local politics, serving as a parish councillor and school governor in Thelwall, Warrington, where she lived. She was elected to Warrington Borough Council in 1987, becoming leader of the Liberal Democrat opposition there in 1991. During her tenure the number of Liberal Democrat councillors more than doubled; she herself was well regarded for her intelligence and hard work for the local community. She served as Warrington's representative on the North West Regional Assembly. She stepped down in 2004.

== Personal life and death ==
In 1957 she married George Mawer, a doctor and pharmacologist, with whom she had three daughters; they later divorced amicably. In 1981 she married Clifford Gordon Taylor, a research chemist.

Mawer died on 7 March 2006 at Christie Hospital in Manchester, having had liver cancer for two years. She left her daughters and her second husband.
