= Listed buildings in Grappenhall and Thelwall =

Grappenhall and Thelwall is a civil parish in the Borough of Warrington and the ceremonial county of Cheshire, England, and includes the villages of Grappenhall and Thelwall. The Bridgewater Canal and the A56 road pass through Grappenhall and to the south of Thelwall in an east–west direction, and the A50 road runs in a north–south direction between them. Within the parish are 30 buildings that are recorded in the National Heritage List for England as designated listed buildings. Of these, one is listed at Grade I, the highest of the three grades, and the other 28 at Grade II, the lowest grade. The Grade I listed building is a church dating back to the 12th century. The Grade II listed buildings comprise a variety of structures, including another church, houses, aqueducts, bridges, a public house, farm buildings, stocks, a sundial, a milepost, a mounting block, a war memorial, and a telephone kiosk.

== Key ==
Grade	Criteria
Grade I	Buildings of exceptional interest, sometimes considered to be internationally important.
Grade II	Buildings of national importance and special interest.

== Listed buildings ==
Name and location	Photograph	Date	Notes	Grade
St Wilfrid's Church, Grappenhall; 53.3723°N 2.5434°W		12th century	There is some Norman fabric in the south wall of the nave, the south chapel was built as a chantry in about 1334, and the tower and most of the rest of the church date from 1525 to 1539. The clerestory was added in 1833, and the north vestry in 1851. In 1873–74 Paley and Austin carried out a restoration.	I
Pickering Arms Inn, Thelwall; 53.3834°N 2.5249°W		17th century	A public house that is basically timber-framed with brick infill, and with extensions in brick and sandstone. It has a T-shaped plan, and is in two storeys. The windows are casements.	II
Thelwall Old Hall; 53.3845°N 2.5254°W		17th century (probable)	A sandstone house, the front of which is pebble-dashed. It is in two storeys with a stone-slate roof. The house has a two-storey porch, and a cross-wing on the right side.	II
Stocks, Grappenhall; 53.37210°N 2.54366°W		17th century (probable)	The stocks consist of a pair of slotted, round-headed endstones at the entrance to St Wilfrid's churchyard. The original oak stocks have been replaced.	II
Ivy Cottage, Thelwall; 53.3844°N 2.5252°W		Mid-17th century	A timber-framed cottage on a sandstone plinth with a slate roof.	II
Old Hall Farmhouse, Thelwall; 53.3840°N 2.5156°W		1655	Basically a timber-framed house, the exterior was largely rebuilt during the 19th century in brick, with false timber framing added to the front. It is in two storeys, with dormer windows in the front face. There is a small timber-framed wing at the rear.	II
Home Farmhouse, Thelwall; 53.3824°N 2.5164°W	—	1692	A rectangular brick house on a sandstone plinth that was altered in 1745. It is in two storeys plus an attic.	II
Sundial, Grappenhall; 53.37216°N 2.54348°W		1714	In the churchyard of St Wilfrid's Church, the sundial stands on a turned shaft of stone.	II
Thelwall Hall; 53.3841°N 2.5208°W		After 1747	A Georgian brick house, extended in the 19th century with the addition of bay windows. It has a Doric doorcase, and has since been occupied by Chaigeley School.	II
Barns and stable, Home Farm, Thelwall; 53.3821°N 2.5165°W	—	Mid-18th century (probable)	Originally a threshing barn, cartshed and a stable, later used for storage. In brick with internal timber-framed walls.	II
Beech Cottage and House, Thelwall; 53.3836°N 2.5179°W		1764	A two-storey brown brick house with stone dressings on a sandstone plinth with a stone-slate roof and rusticated quoins.	II
Lumb Brook Bridge; 53.3702°N 2.5694°W	—	1770	An aqueduct carrying the Bridgewater Canal and towpath over Lumb Brook Road. Designed by James Brindley, it is constructed in sandstone with a brick lining to the arch and a brick parapet. A ramped footpath with sandstone retaining walls climbs from the road to the towpath.	II
Church Lane Bridge, Grappenhall; 53.3720°N 2.5420°W		c. 1770	A bridge carrying Church Lane over the Bridgewater Canal designed by James Brindley. It is in red-brown brick with red sandstone dressings.	II
Halfacre Lane Aqueduct; 53.3793°N 2.5208°W		c. 1770	An aqueduct carrying the Bridgewater Canal and towpath over Halfacre Lane. Designed by James Brindley, it is constructed in sandstone and brick.	II
Pickering's Bridge; 53.37775°N 2.52597°W		1770	An accommodation bridge over the Bridgewater Canal, it was designed by James Brindley. It is in red-brown brick with sandstone dressings, and consists of a single segmental arch.	II
Barn and Shippon, Old Village Farm, Thelwall; 53.3843°N 2.5258°W		Late 18th century	The shippon is at a right-angle to the barn. The buildings are in brick with some sandstone.	II
Greenbank, Grappenhall; 53.3711°N 2.5424°W		c. 1800	A two-storey house in rendered brick with a slate roof. The porch has a Tudor arched opening and a Neoclassical cornice. The windows at the front of the house are 12-pane sashes.	II
Milepost, Stockport Road, Thelwall; 53.38240°N 2.51481°W	—	c. 1821	A cast iron milepost surviving from the Warrington to Altrincham turnpike road that opened in 1821.	II
2 and 4, Laurel Bank, Grappenhall; 53.3718°N 2.5395°W	—	Early 19th century	A pair of two-storey houses in rendered brick with a slate-covered hipped roof. The windows are sashes.	II
Bridge Stores, Grappenhall; 53.3718°N 2.5418°W		Early 19th century	A shop, dwelling and store shed in painted brick with slate hipped roofs. The shop window has 20 panes, and the other windows are 16-pane recessed sashes.	II
Church Cottages, Grappenhall; 53.3723°N 2.5443°W		c. 1830	A pair of rendered cottages in two storeys, with gables and slate roofs. On their front is a continuous verandah carried on cast iron supports.	II
Grappenhall Rectory; 53.3719°N 2.5434°W		c. 1830	A Gothic stuccoed house with a grey slate roof, in two storeys. The porch has a Tudor arch, and is crenellated with corner pinnacles. On each side of the porch is a canted bay containing a window with a pointed arch; the windows in the upper storey are two-light casements, each light having 12 panes. On each side of the house is a wing with 12-pane recessed sash window.	II
Pair of gatepiers, Grappenhall Rectory; 53.3720°N 2.5435°W		c. 1830	A pair of square sandstone piers at the entrance to the rectory, surmounted by urns.	II
Parish Hall, Grappenhall; 53.3720°N 2.5439°W	—	c. 1840	A parish hall opposite the church in brown brick with a gabled slate roof. At the entrance is a pair of cast iron gates between plain stone gatepiers.	II
Bellhouse Farmhouse, Grappenhall; 53.3728°N 2.5383°W	—	c. 1840	A two-storey brick house with slate roofs, It has a porch carried on ornate cast iron supports, and a gabled dormer above. The windows are casements.	II
All Saints Church, Thelwall; 53.3824°N 2.5281°W		1843	The church is constructed in sandstone with slate roofs. The nave was designed by J. Mountford Allen, the chancel was added in 1856, and further additions were made in 1890. Inside the church is a memorial to Edward the Elder by Eric Gill.	II
Mounting block, Chester Road, Grappenhall; 53.37298°N 2.55408°W	—	1859	A monolithic mounting block in sandstone with two steps at each end and an inscription naming the donor.	II
Thelwall Heys; 53.3763°N 2.5332°W	—	1864	An asymmetrical country house designed by Alfred Waterhouse. It is in red-brown brick with banding and decoration in yellow and blue brick, and with sandstone dressings. The house has steeply pitched slate roofs.	II
War memorial, Thelwall; 53.3821°N 2.5225°W		c. 1923	A granite memorial commemorating the First World War consisting of a cross in Anglo-Saxon style set in a small garden. It is carved with depictions of King Edward the Elder and angels.	II
Telephone Kiosk, Thelwall; 53.38365°N 2.52481°W		1935	A cast iron type K6 telephone kiosk, designed by Giles Gilbert Scott.	II

== See also ==
- Listed buildings in Appleton
- Listed buildings in High Legh
- Listed buildings in Lymm
- Listed buildings in Stockton Heath
- Listed buildings in Stretton
- Listed buildings in Warrington (unparished area)
- Listed buildings in Woolston
