= All Saints Church, Thelwall =

Coordinates: 53.3821°N 2.5281°W

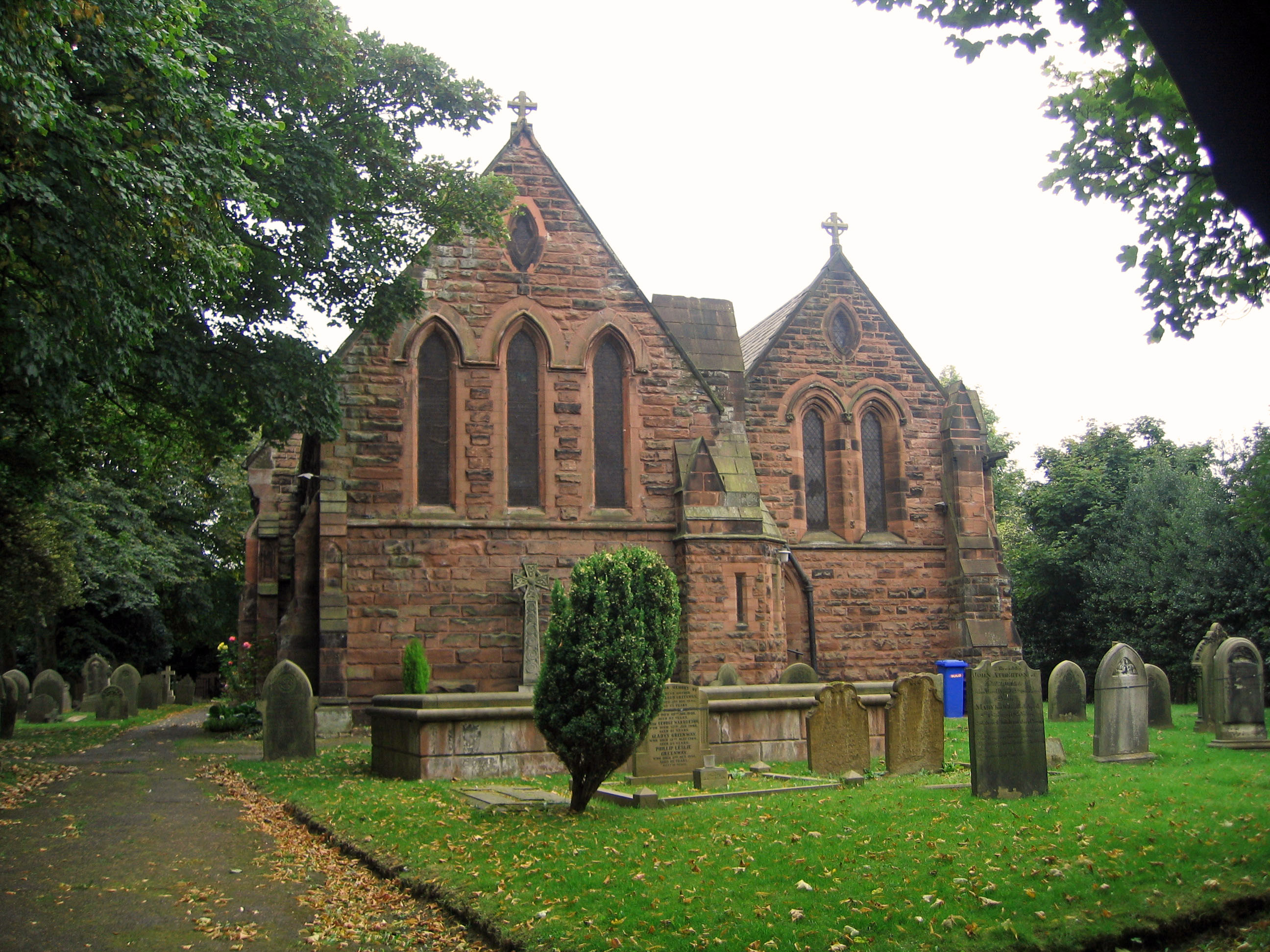
- All Saints Church, Thelwall, from the west

- Location in Cheshire
- OS grid reference: SJ 650 875
- Location: Thelwall, Cheshire
- Country: England
- Denomination: Anglican
- Website: All Saints, Thelwall

History
- Dedication: All Saints

Architecture
- Heritage designation: Grade II
- Designated: 14 June 1984
- Architect(s): James Mountford Allen; William Owen
- Architectural type: Church
- Style: Gothic Revival
- Groundbreaking: 1843
- Completed: 1890

Specifications
- Materials: Sandstone with slate roofs

Administration
- Province: York
- Diocese: Chester
- Archdeaconry: Chester
- Deanery: Great Budworth
- Parish: All Saints, Thelwall

All Saints Church is in the village of Thelwall, Cheshire, England. The church is recorded in the National Heritage List for England as a designated Grade II listed building. It is an active Anglican parish church in the diocese of Chester, the archdeaconry of Chester and the deanery of Great Budworth.

== History ==
The origins of a church or chapel at Thelwall are unclear. It has been thought that a chapel was built by Richard Brooke of Norton Priory but a legal suit in 1663 suggests that there was a chapel on the site before this date. At this time Thelwall was in the parish of Runcorn. In 1663 the chapel on the site was restored by Robert Pickering. After this the chapel fell into disrepair. It was restored again and re-opened in 1782. By the following century the church was too small for its congregation and in 1843 a new church was built and consecrated. This consisted of a nave which was designed by James Mountford Allen. In 1856 the chancel was built at the expense of James Nicholson and the nave was extended by one bay. In 1890 Henry Stanton commissioned a new north aisle, a new baptistry with a new font, and a new vestry. The aisle and vestry, together with a north porch, were designed by William Owen.

== Architecture ==
The church is built in sandstone with steeply pitched slate roofs. Its plan consists of a nave of six bays, a chancel of two bays, a north aisle and a west porch. A west bellcote has one bell.

The chancel has a floor of marble and coloured glazed tiles. The reredos has two panels of Biblical scenes in marble which are separated by plaster angels. In the church is a memorial to Edward the Elder who founded Thelwall in 923. This is dated 1907 and is by Eric Gill. The frame of the memorial is by F. C. Eden and Helfar Bros. From around 1884 the organ used had been built by Gray and Davidson, and in 1964 it was rebuilt by Jardine. By the 21st century the electrical control system had deteriorated and this was replaced in 2005 by a solid-state system made by John Lifton.

== External features ==
The churchyard contains war graves of three soldiers of World War I.

== See also ==
- Listed buildings in Grappenhall and Thelwall
