= Grappenhall Heys Walled Garden =

Park in Grappenhall, Cheshire, England

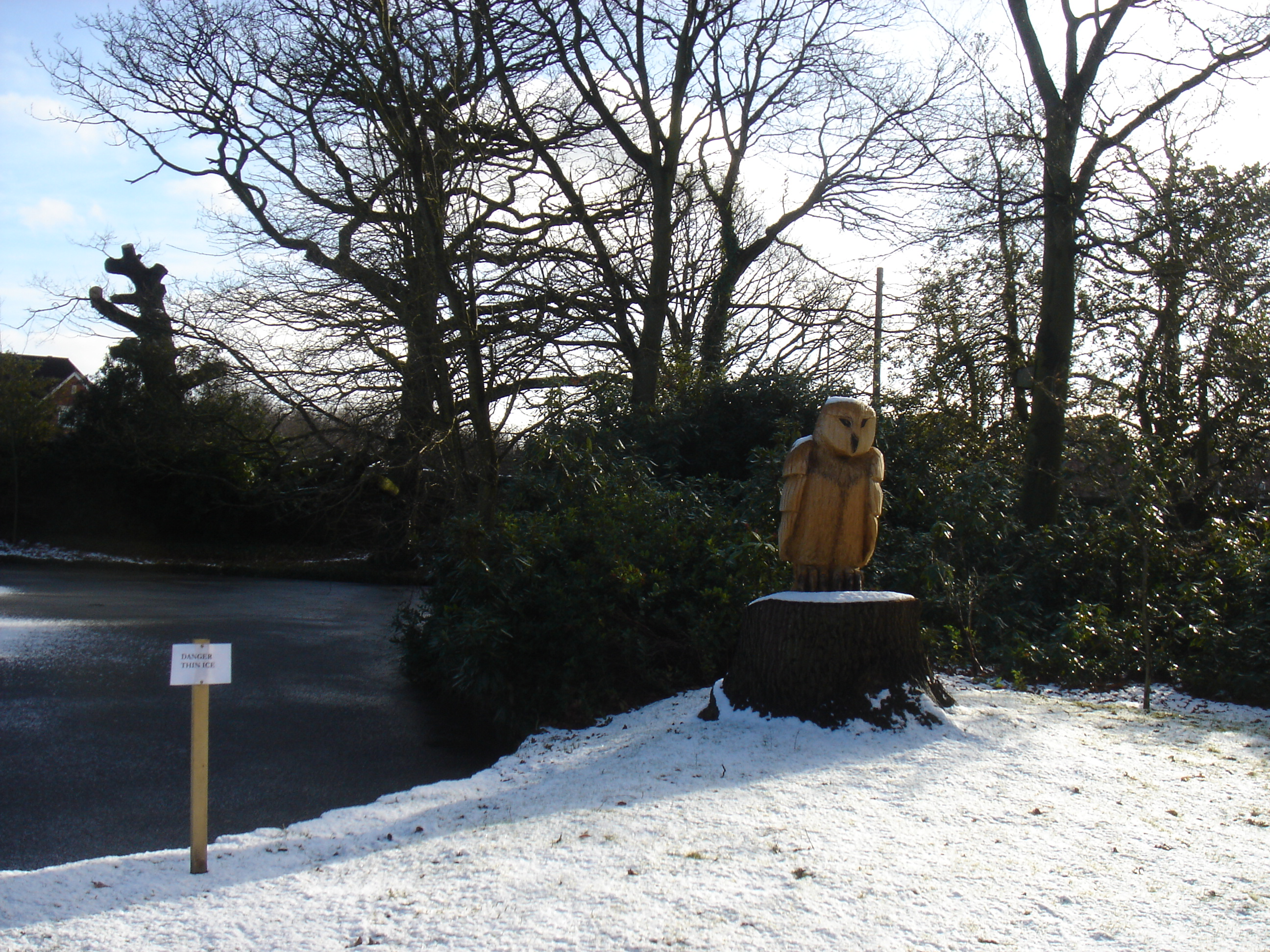
- The garden in winter
- Interactive map of Grappenhall Heys Walled Garden
- Type: Public garden
- Location: Grappenhall, Warrington, Cheshire, England
- Coordinates: 53.3649°N 2.5551°W
- Created: 1830
- Operator: Grappenhall Parish Council
- Status: Open all year
- Website: Grappenhall Heys Walled Garden

Grappenhall Heys Walled Garden is a historic walled garden in Grappenhall, Warrington, Cheshire, England. The garden was built by Thomas Parr around 1830 as both a pleasure garden for relaxing strolls and as a kitchen garden to produce fruit, vegetables, and herbs. After a period of decline, the garden was restored first by English Partnerships and then by the local parish council in conjunction with the friends of the garden.

== History ==
The walled garden was built around 1830 by Warrington banker Thomas Parr to accompany a mansion house. Thomas Parr's father, Joseph Parr, founded Parr's Bank and Thomas was appointed Chairman of the bank. Before opening the bank, Joseph Parr had made his wealth in the sugar refining industry that supported the slave trade in the British West Indies. Parr's bank amalgamated through acquisitions into the NatWest.

Unusually, Parr included both a pleasure garden and a kitchen garden within the same boundary wall. In addition to enjoying their garden, the Parr family held frequent galas and special events for the community. One annual event called "Beating the Bounds" involved a walk around the boundaries of the townships of Lymm, Appleton, and Grappenhall, which included the garden. Historical records suggest that the estate was at its height from 1875 to 1899.

By the 1950s, the estate had become derelict and parts of it were sold off. The house was demolished in the 1970s and the garden passed to English Partnerships for renovation. In 2005 control of the garden passed to Grappenhall and Thelwall Parish Council, which continued restoration in conjunction with a community group called "The Friends of Grappenhall Heys Walled Garden". In 2012 the garden was given a Heritage Lottery Fund award towards repair of the Victorian glasshouses and completion of the restoration.

== Description ==
=== Pleasure garden ===
There is a pleasure garden with herbaceous borders, specimen trees, wooded copses, and three ponds. An 1829 tithe map shows the ponds were originally marl pits created by small-scale marl extraction. Over time the ponds became heavily silted up, but were sufficiently deep to obscure workers below ground level when they were eventually excavated during restoration. The footpath around the pleasure garden was named the "Master's Walk".

=== Kitchen garden ===
There is a kitchen garden which produces fruits, vegetables, and herbs, cultivated by the Warrington Organic Gardening Society. Varieties of pear and more than 20 varieties of apple are grown in a small orchard. Grapes and tomatoes are cultivated in fully restored glasshouses. Surplus fruits and vegetables are sold to the public.

=== Facilities ===
The garden is a popular attraction in Warrington. Facilities include a cafe, toilets, and free access. In recognition of its high standards, in 2018 the garden was given its second Green Flag Award, a benchmark national standard for publicly accessible parks and green spaces in the United Kingdom.

== See also ==
- List of parks and open spaces in Cheshire
