= Thomas de Thelwall =

English judge and Crown official

Thomas de Thelwall (died 1382) was an English judge and Crown official who spent part of his career in Ireland, where he held office as Master of the Rolls in Ireland and Clerk to the Privy Council of Ireland. He was Chancellor of the Duchy of Lancaster 1377–78.

Little is known of his early life; his surname suggests that he was a native of Thelwall, Cheshire. He is first heard of as a Clerk in the Royal Chancery in about 1360. He is always called "Clerk" in the official records. He became parish priest of Polebrook in Northamptonshire in 1361. In that year he acknowledged payment of 4 shillings from Henry Averynge of Flintham, Nottinghamshire, as part payment of a debt of £4 which Henry admitted was owing to him.

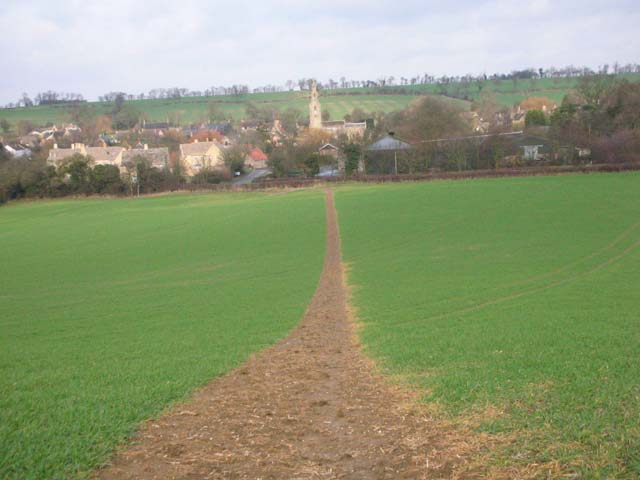
Polebrook, Northamptonshire: Thomas was parish priest here

In 1369 he accompanied Sir William de Windsor, the new Lord Lieutenant, to Ireland; he became Master of the Rolls in 1372, at a fee of £20, and a prebendary of St Patrick's Cathedral, Dublin. Otway-Ruthven describes him in 1374 as Clerk to the Irish Privy Council, one of the first men to have held this office. The Patent Roll records an extra payment of 5 marks to Thelwall in 1372 for carrying the Rolls and other memorials of the Irish Chancery to the Lord Deputy of Ireland and the Council at Cork.

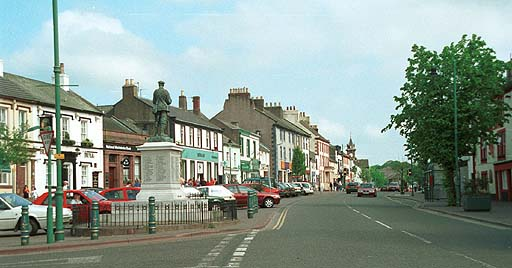
Egremont, Cumbria: Thomas and others acquired the castle in 1375 as security for a loan to the owner Lord Fitzwalter

He returned to England in about 1375. In that year he became one of several co-tenants of the castle of Egremont, Cumbria, formerly held by Walter Fitzwalter, 3rd Baron Fitzwalter (died 1386), together with Lord Fitzwalter's other lands in Cumbria. This was by operation of statute merchant, an early and now obsolete form of security for a loan? not dissimilar to a modern mortgage. Lord Fitzwalter had borrowed 1,000 marks from Thomas and his fellow tenants. However it seems that the real beneficiary of the statute merchant, in this case, was Sir William de Windsor's wife Alice Perrers, the notoriously rapacious mistress of King Edward III, who as a woman of her time was obliged to act through male agents. As a senior royal official, and a colleague of her husband, Thomas no doubt knew Alice personally. The other tenants seem also to have been royal clerks: Hugh de Cottingham was possibly a relative of Thomas de Cottingham (died 1370), another former Master of the Rolls in Ireland.The castle soon passed to the Earl of Northumberland.

Thelwall was appointed Chancellor of the Duchy of Lancaster in 1377, but held office for only a year. He is thought to have died in 1382.
