= Cheshire Cat =

Character from Alice's Adventures in Wonderland

- Alice's Adventures in Wonderland character
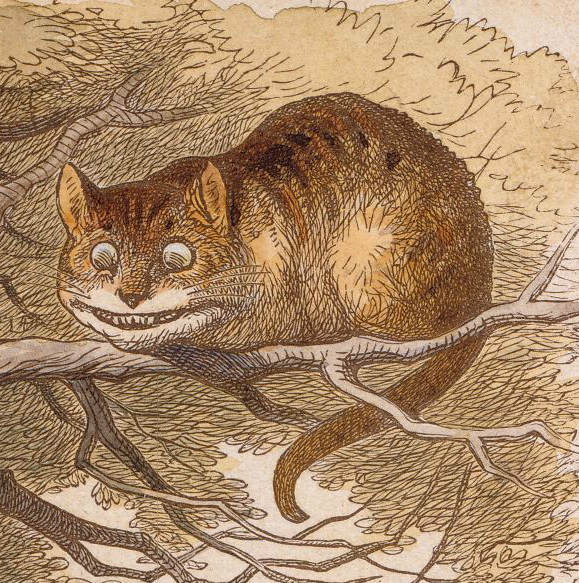
- The Cheshire Cat as illustrator John Tenniel depicted him in the 1865 publication
- Created by: Lewis Carroll

In-universe information
- Species: Cat
- Gender: Male (Note: The Queen of Hearts cries "off with his head" when the cat upsets the king.)
- Quote: "Most everyone's mad here." "You may have noticed that I'm not all there myself."

The Cheshire Cat (/ˈtʃɛʃər, -ɪər/ CHESH-ər, -eer) is a fictional cat popularized by Lewis Carroll in Alice's Adventures in Wonderland. While now most often used in Alice-related contexts, the association of a "Cheshire cat" with grinning predates the 1865 book. He is known for his distinctive mischievous grin.

He has transcended the context of literature and become enmeshed in popular culture, appearing in various forms of media, from political cartoons to television, as well as in cross-disciplinary studies, from business to science. Often he is shown in the context of a person or idea that is purposefully confusing or enigmatic. One distinguishing feature of the Alice-style Cheshire Cat is the periodic gradual disappearance of its body, leaving only one last visible trace: his iconic grin. He belongs to the Duchess.

== Origins ==
The first known appearance of the expression in literature is in the 18th century, in Francis Grose's A Classical Dictionary of the Vulgar Tongue, Second, Corrected and Enlarged Edition (1788), which contains the following entry:

Cheshire cat. He grins like a Cheshire cat; said of any one who shows his teeth and gums in laughing.

The phrase appears again in print in John Wolcot's pseudonymous Peter Pindar's Pair of Lyric Epistles (1792):

"Lo, like a Cheshire cat our court will grin."

The phrase also appears in print in William Makepeace Thackeray's novel The Newcomes (1855):

"That woman grins like a Cheshire cat."

There are numerous theories about the origin of the phrase "grinning like a Cheshire Cat" in English history. A possible origin of the phrase is one favoured by the people of Cheshire, a county in England which boasts numerous dairy farms; hence the cats grin because of the abundance of milk and cream.

In 1853, Samuel Maunder offered this explanation:

This phrase owes its origin to the unhappy attempts of a sign painter of that country to represent a lion rampant, which was the crest of an influential family, on the sign-boards of many of the inns. The resemblance of these lions to cats caused them to be generally called by the more ignoble name. A similar case is to be found in the village of Charlton, between Pewsey and Devizes, Wiltshire. A public-house by the roadside is commonly known by the name of The Cat at Charlton. The sign of the house was originally a lion or tiger, or some such animal, the crest of the family of Sir Edward Poore.

According to Brewer's Dictionary (1870), "The phrase has never been satisfactorily accounted for, but it has been said that cheese was formerly sold in Cheshire moulded like a cat that looked as though it was grinning". (Note: This was the stated explanation in Martin Gardner's Annotated Alice.) The cheese was cut from the tail end, so that the last part eaten was the head of the smiling cat. A later edition of Brewer's adds another possible explanation, similar to Maunder's, that a painter in Cheshire once used to paint grinning lions on inns. The dictionary does not expand further on this, its editors possibly considering the connection between cats and lions self-explanatory or obvious.

A 2015 article published in the Cheshire History journal examined these suggested origins, along with numerous others seen on the internet. The author, Peter Young, considered most to be "inventive" but unlikely. In his analysis, the essential feature of any actual historical explanation would be one that demonstrated its innate connection to Cheshire: An idiom that retained the localism while spreading nationwide, would, in his view, need to be strongly connected to the county, in the minds of people elsewhere. For this reason, he favours the well-fed farm cats of Cheshire's dairying environment—a widely-known and well-promoted idea at the time the phrase arose—as the best candidate for the origin of the Cheshire Cat idiom.

== Lewis Carroll's character ==
The Cheshire Cat is now largely identified with the character of the same name in Lewis Carroll's 1865 novel Alice's Adventures in Wonderland. Alice first encounters the Cheshire Cat at the Duchess's house in her kitchen, and later on the branches of a tree, where he appears and disappears at will, and engages Alice in amusing but sometimes perplexing conversation. The cat sometimes raises philosophical points that annoy or baffle Alice; but appears to cheer her when he appears suddenly at the Queen of Hearts' croquet field; and when sentenced to death, baffles everyone by having made his head appear without his body, sparking a debate between the executioner and the King and Queen of Hearts about whether a disembodied head can indeed be beheaded. At one point, the cat disappears gradually until nothing is left but his grin, prompting Alice to remark that "she has often seen a cat without a grin but never a grin without a cat".

=== Oxford professor E. B. Pusey ===
The scholar David Day has proposed Lewis Carroll's cat was Edward Bouverie Pusey, Oxford professor of Hebrew and Carroll's mentor.

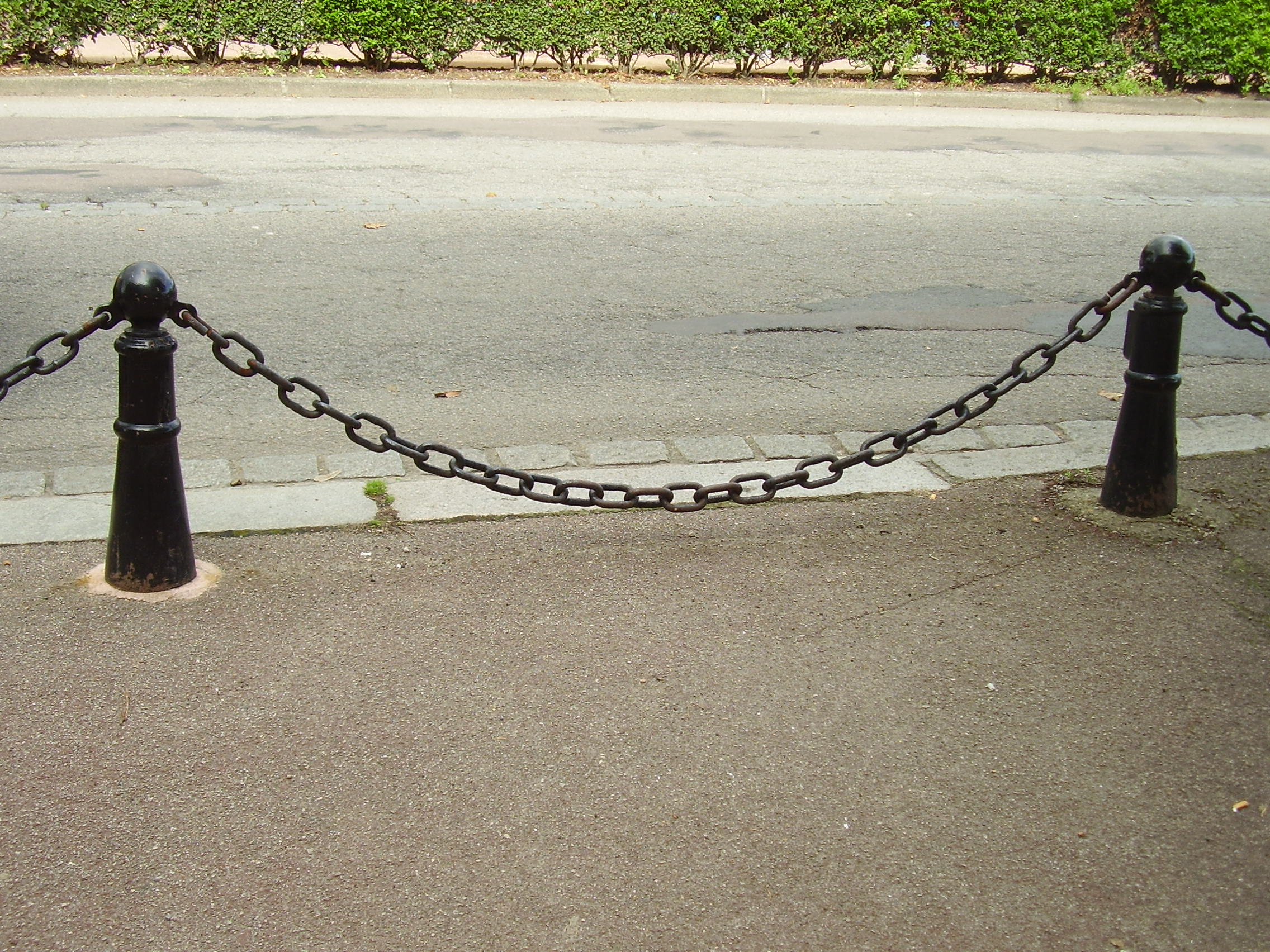
A hanging chain forms a catenary.

The name Pusey was suggested by Alice's deferential address of the cat as "Cheshire Puss". Pusey was an authority on the fathers of the Christian Church, and in Carroll's time Pusey was known as the Patristic Catenary (or chain), after the chain of authority of Church patriarchs.

As a mathematician, Carroll would have been well familiar with the other meaning of catenary: the curve of a horizontally-suspended chain, which suggests the shape of the cat's grin.

Riddle: What kind of a cat can grin? Answer: A Catenary.

— David Day, Queen's Quarterly (2010)

=== Source of imagery ===
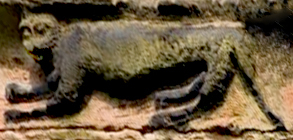
Grinning Cheshire Cat, St Wilfrid's Church, Grappenhall, Cheshire

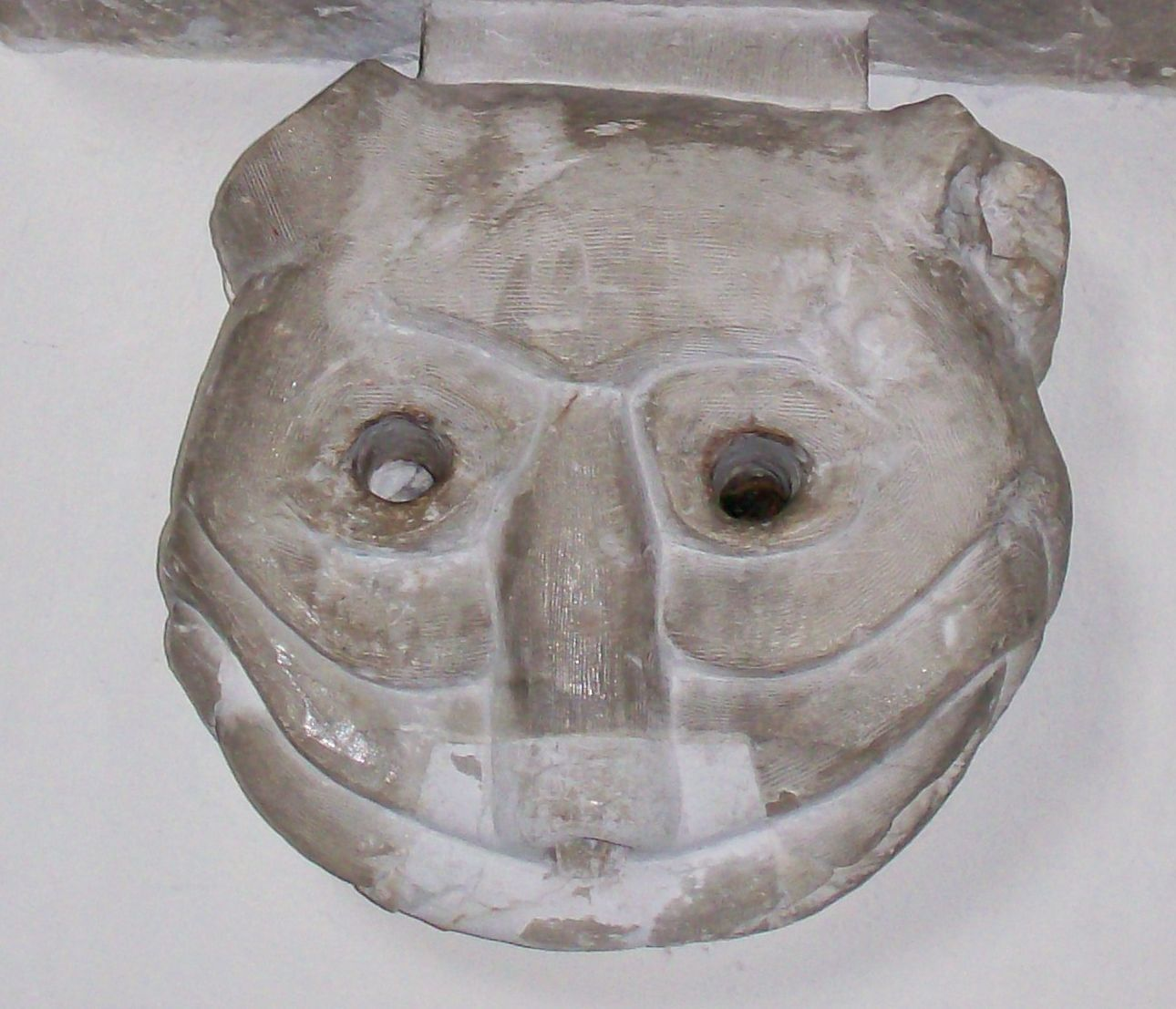
The cat carving in St Nicolas's Church, Cranleigh, Surrey

There are various competing suggestions as to Carroll's source of inspiration for the character.

He may have found inspiration for the name and expression of the Cheshire Cat from the 16th-century sandstone carving of a grinning cat on the west face of St Wilfrid's Church tower in Grappenhall, a village 5 miles (8 km) from his birthplace in Daresbury, Cheshire.

In 1992, members of the Lewis Carroll Society attributed it to a gargoyle on a pillar in St Nicolas's Church, Cranleigh, where Carroll used to travel frequently when he lived in Guildford (though this is doubtful, as he moved to Guildford some three years after Alice's Adventures in Wonderland had been published). An alternative source is a carving in a church in the village of Croft-on-Tees, in the north east of England. Lewis Carroll's father, Reverend Charles Dodgson, was Rector of Croft and Archdeacon of Richmond in North Yorkshire, England, from 1843 to 1868; Carroll lived here from 1843 to 1850.

St Christopher's church in Pott Shrigley, Cheshire, has a stone sculpture resembling the cat pictured in the book.

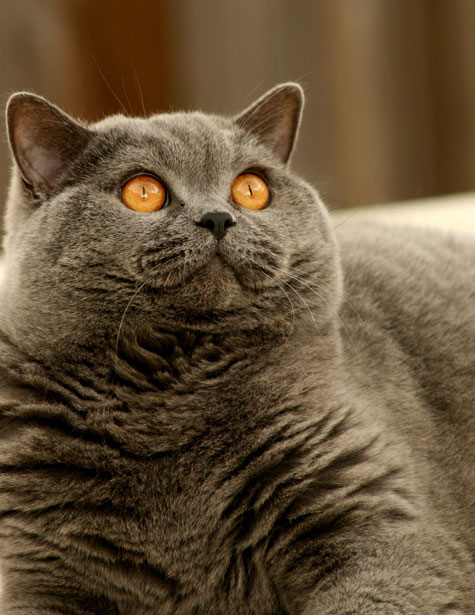
A fully mature British Shorthair

Another possible inspiration was the British Shorthair: Carroll saw a representative British Shorthair illustrated on a label of Cheshire cheese. The Cat Fanciers' Association profile reads: “When gracelessness is observed, the British Shorthair is duly embarrassed, quickly recovering with a 'Cheshire cat smile'”.

== Adaptations ==
The Cheshire Cat character has been re-depicted by other creators and used as the inspiration for new characters, primarily in screen media (film, television, video games) and print media (literature, comics, art). Other non-media contexts that embrace the Cheshire Cat include music, business, and science.

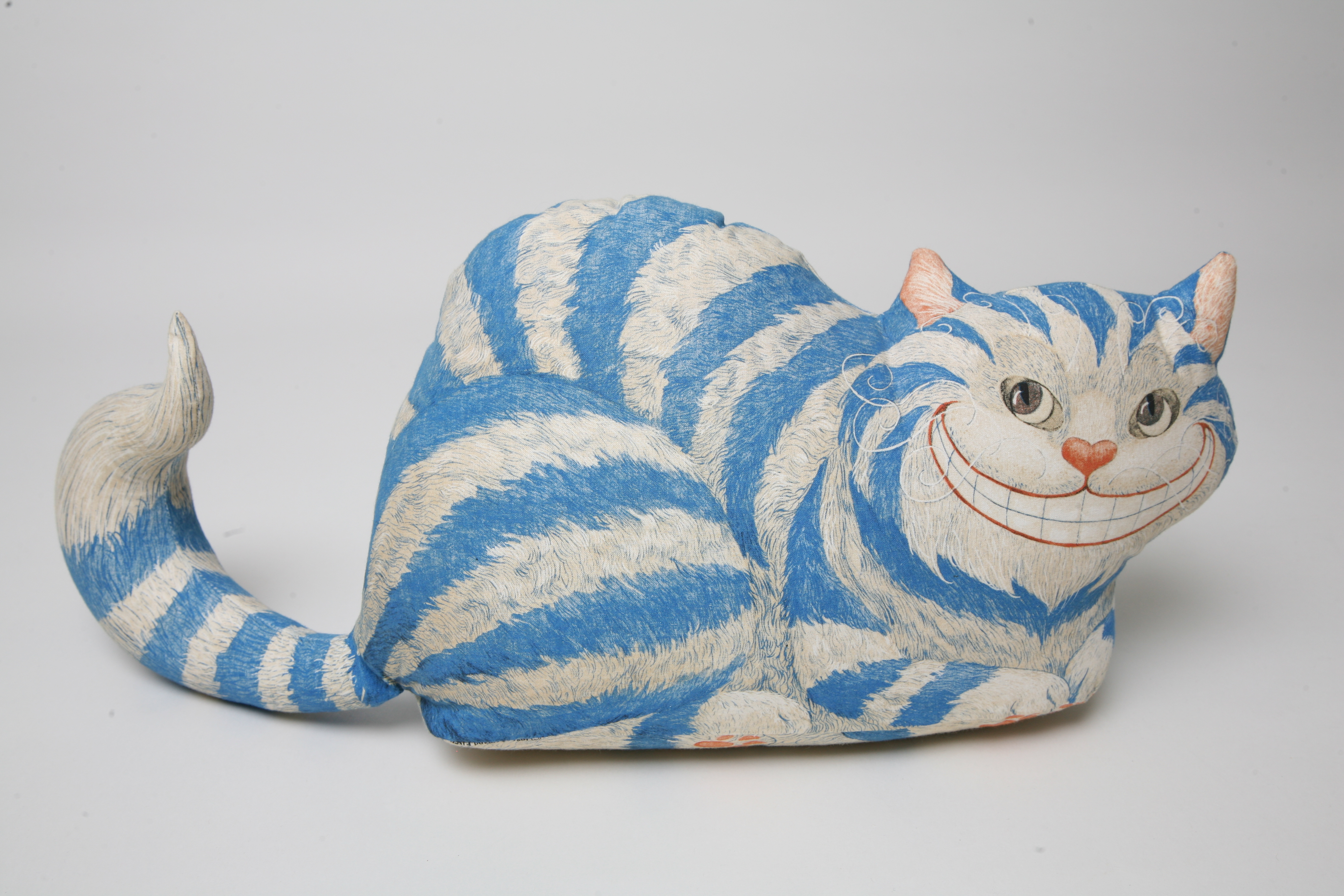
A Cheshire cat stuffed toy from The Children's Museum of Indianapolis

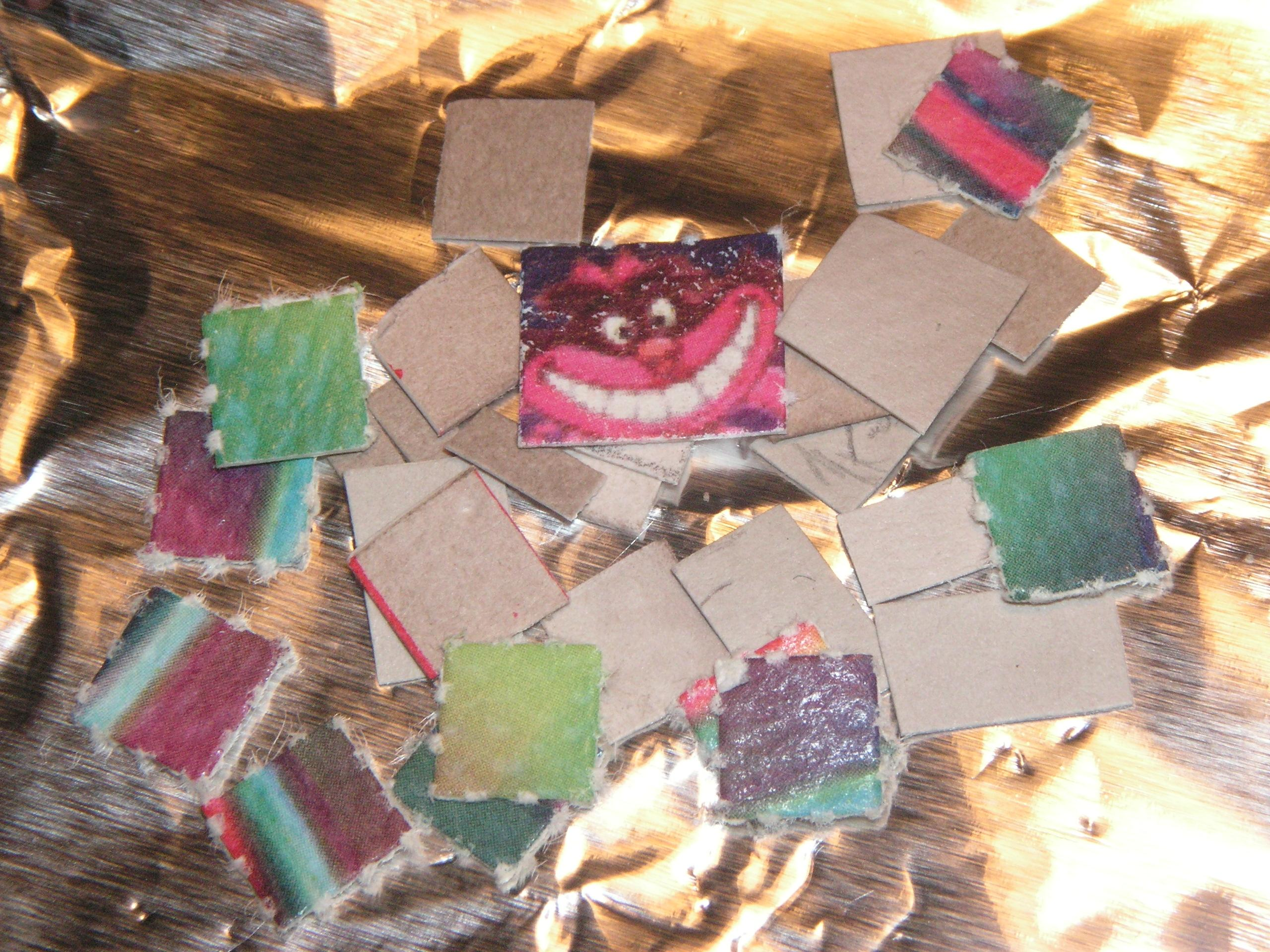
Several LSD blotters, one of which features the Cheshire Cat's face as depicted in Disney's 1951 film

Martin Gardner, author of The Annotated Alice, wondered if T. S. Eliot had the Cheshire Cat in mind when writing "Morning at the Window", but notes no other significant allusions in the pre-war period.

Images of and references to the Cheshire Cat cropped up with increasing frequency in the 1960s and 1970s, along with more frequent references to Carroll's works in general. The Cheshire Cat appeared on LSD blotters, as well as in song lyrics and popular fiction.

In Disney's 1951 animated film, Alice in Wonderland, the Cheshire Cat is depicted as an intelligent and mischievous character that sometimes helps Alice and sometimes gets her into trouble. He frequently sings the first verse of the "Jabberwocky" poem. The character was voiced by Sterling Holloway, who is best known as the voice of Winnie the Pooh. This version of the character has appeared since then in other Disney media, among them Alice's Wonderland Bakery, a series set several generations after the Disney film, where the Cheshire Cat, voiced by Max Mittelman, is depicted as an immortal, being the only character besides the Doorknob not to be represented through a descendant of other of the characters. In October 2019, it was reported that an undetermined Cheshire Cat project is being developed by Disney for its streaming service, Disney+, but no more information about the project was mentioned since then. A Lego version of the character (voiced by Jim Cummings) appear in the 2026 special Lego Disney Princess: Magical Mayhem.

In the 1985 television adaptation of Carroll's books, the Cheshire Cat is portrayed by Telly Savalas. He sings a morose song called "There's No Way Home", which simply drives Alice to try and find a way home even more.

In the 1999 television adaptation of Carroll's books, the Cheshire Cat is portrayed by Whoopi Goldberg. She acts as an ally and friend to Alice.

The Cheshire Cat appears in Alice in Wonderland (2010), voiced by Stephen Fry. In the film, Cheshire (as he is often called; or sometimes "Ches") binds the wound Alice suffered earlier by the Bandersnatch and guides her to Tarrant Hightopp, the Mad Hatter and Thackery Earwicket, the March Hare. He is blamed by the Hatter for desertion when the White Queen is deposed by the Red; but later impersonates the Hatter when the latter is sentenced to decapitation. Throughout his appearances, "Ches" is able to make himself intangible or weightless, as well as invisible (and thus to survive decapitation), and is usually depicted in mid-air, at shoulder-height to human-sized characters. In the video game adaptation of the film, Ches is a playable character who can not only turn himself invisible, but other objects around him as well.

=== Cross-screen comparison ===
Each major film adaptation of Lewis Carroll's tale represents the Cheshire Cat character and his traits uniquely.

Screen adaptation	Detail	Image	Cheshire Cat's behaviour	Cheshire Cat's appearance
Alice in Wonderland (1951)	Animated film. Cheshire Cat voiced by Sterling Holloway.		Mischievous, and takes pleasure in misdirecting Alice. He is able to dislocate his head from his body (does so in jest), but is also capable of invisibility, and frequently enters and exits the scene with all parts faded away except for his grin or eyes.	Thick build and a primarily pink coat with purple stripes. Wide smile and close-set, piercing yellow eyes. Character always depicted in good lighting with strong visibility, unlike other adaptations which obscure or shadow him
Adventures in Wonderland (1991–1995)	Broadcast TV show. Cheshire Cat voiced by Richard Kuhlman.		A sarcastic and playful rendition of the character. In this adaptation, the Cheshire Cat has the ability to appear and disappear in any location. He is quick to play practical jokes on the other characters in the show.	Closer resemblance to a tiger or lioness than a house cat. Coat has a lilac base with stripes painted in a violet accent colour. Form possesses human-like mouth and facial structure
Alice in Wonderland (1999)	Made-for-TV movie. Cheshire Cat voiced by Whoopi Goldberg.		A grinning cat who teaches Alice "the rules" of Wonderland. Her favourite pastime is appearing and disappearing.	A fluffy grey cat with a human face and feline features
Alice in Wonderland (2010) and Alice Through the Looking Glass (2016)	Live-action/CGI animation films. Cheshire Cat voiced by Stephen Fry.		Disappearing and reappearing at will, and able even to change his size, levitate himself, assume the appearances of other characters, and become intangible at will. The cat plays a few jokes and toys with the other characters, but is helpful on a few occasions. He speaks in a slow and fluid manner.	More slender build, with a round head and grey coat with blue stripes. Bright aqua eyes (with slit-shaped pupils) and prominent teeth. Often more backlit than other adaptations, with only a faint, bioluminescent glow bringing his features into view.

In addition to the Cheshire Cat's appearances in films central to his Lewis Carroll origins, the Cheshire Cat has been featured in other cinematic works. The late filmmaker Chris Marker gave his monumental documentary on the New Left movement of 1967–1977, Le fond de l'air est rouge (1977), the English title Grin without a Cat. Like the original, it signifies that revolution was in the air, but failed to take root. In the film, it is also stated: a spearhead without a spear, a grin without a cat. A later Marker film, Chats perchés (2004) (The Case of the Grinning Cat in English), examined the context of M. Chat street art in France.

The Cheshire Cat appears in the first episode of the television series Once Upon a Time in Wonderland (a spin-off of Once Upon a Time) voiced by Keith David. While looking for the Mad Hatter's house from the trees, Alice encounters the Cheshire Cat in giant form where the Red Queen had promised him that Alice would be good food for him. They end up engaging each other in combat until the Knave of Hearts arrives and throws a piece of one mushroom side into his mouth, which shrinks the Cat back to normal size, and he leaves.

The Cheshire Cat appears as a silent character in the 2024 animated movie The Night Before Christmas in Wonderland.

In Descendants: Wicked Wonderland, Chessy Cheshire, voiced by Awkwafina, is the daughter of the Cheshire Cat and is Maddox' companion, the son of the Mad Hatter. She also serves as the narrator of the film.

=== Video games ===
The Cheshire Cat depicted in American McGee's Alice

The Cheshire Cat appears in the video games American McGee's Alice (2000); and the sequel Alice: Madness Returns (2011), voiced by Roger L. Jackson. He is portrayed as an enigmatic and snarky, yet wise guide for Alice in the corrupted Wonderland.

The Disney incarnation of the Cheshire Cat appears in the Kingdom Hearts series, voiced by Jim Cummings. Introduced in Kingdom Hearts (2002), he makes subsequent appearances in Kingdom Hearts: Chain of Memories (2004), Kingdom Hearts Coded (2008), and Kingdom Hearts 358/2 Days (2009).

The Cheshire Cat appears in Sunsoft's 2006 mobile game Alice's Warped Wonderland (歪みの国のアリス, Yugami no kuni no Arisu; Alice in Distortion World), serving as the guide to Ariko (the "Alice" of the game) and helps her chase after the White Rabbit. In the game, Cheshire Cat is portrayed with a humanoid body and wears a long grey cloak with a red-string bell around his neck, leaving only his nose and mouth visible. In Wonderland, Cheshire Cat is the "Guide", an important role that makes him feared by the other residents, and is compelled by Ariko's will to help her unlock her suppressed, traumatic memories and overcome her suicidal depression. Later in the game, the Cheshire Cat is beheaded by the Queen of Hearts, but is still alive and his body is able to move on its own. Due to the White Rabbit's deranged state, Cheshire Cat fulfils his role of absorbing Ariko's negative emotions, though the task puts a large strain on him.

The Cheshire Cat appears in Alice in the Country of Hearts, a dating sim game and its related media, as a young man named "Boris Airay", with cat-like attributes such as a tail and cat ears, and is one of the many love interests for Alice in Wonderland.

The 2008 indie game OFF features The Judge, a monochromatic cat who bears a striking resemblance to the cheshire cat's smile.

The 2018 indie game Deltarune features a reoccurring black cat, under the sprite file name “IMAGE_FRIEND”. Although unconfirmed as allusory, it shares traits such as a wide grin and the disembodiment of its smile.

The Cheshire Cat is one of the Alice's Adventures in Wonderland characters reinterpreted in the 2018 indie game Black Souls II.

The Cheshire Cat will make an appearance in the upcoming indie game Habromania, and has had stuffed animals released for him as promotional material along with other material.

The Purrjector Cat from Princess Peach: Showtime is inspired by the Cheshire Cat, based on its perpetual toothy grin, and its arms having black and yellow stripes.

=== Other media ===
American rock band Blink-182's debut studio album, Cheshire Cat, released on 17 February 1995, takes its name from the Cheshire cat.

English rock band Radiohead mentions the Cheshire Cat in their song Jigsaw Falling into Place from their 2007 studio album, In Rainbows. "The walls are bending shape, they've got a Cheshire cat grin"

In the DC Comics series Shazam! and the Seven Magic Lands, the Cheshire Cat is shown to live in the Magiclands location called the Wozenderlands.

== In science ==
Cheshire Cat is used as a metaphor to describe several scientific phenomena:

- The Cheshire Cat effect, as described by Sally Duensing and Bob Miller, is a binocular rivalry which causes stationary objects seen in one eye to disappear from view when an object in motion crosses in front of the other eye.
  Each eye sees two different views of the world, sends those images to the visual cortex where they are combined, and creates a three-dimensional image. The Cheshire Cat effect occurs when one eye is fixated on a stationary object, while the other notices something moving. Since one eye is seeing a moving object, the brain will focus on it, causing parts of the stationary object to fade away from vision entirely.
- In another scientific context, catalytic RNAs have been deemed Cheshire cats. This metaphor is used to describe the fading of the ribonucleotide construct, which leaves behind a smile of only the mineral components of the RNA catalyst.
- Similarly, the Cheshire Cat has been used out of his traditional context to help define another scientific phenomenon, the "Cheshire Cat" escape strategy. When Coccolithophore – a type of algae – is able to resist the haploid phase of its life cycle, it escapes meiosis and its dominant diploid genes are passed on in a virus-free environment, freeing the host from being infected during reproduction. The algae escape death (beheading) by means of disappearance (vanishing his head):
  ... [T]aken from Lewis Carroll, we liken this theory to the strategy used by the Cheshire Cat in Alice's Adventures in Wonderland of making its body invisible to make the sentence "off with his head" pronounced by the Queen of Hearts impossible to execute ... C.C. dynamics, which rely to some extent on separation of the sexual processes of meiosis and fusion in time and / or space, release the host from short-term pathogen pressure, thus widening the scope for the host to evolve in other directions.
- Other gestures to the Cheshire Cat's tropes of disappearance and mystique have been seen in scientific literature coming from the field of Physics. The quantum Cheshire cat is a phenomenon in quantum mechanics in which a particle and its property behave as if they are separated, or when a particle separates from one of its physical properties. To test this idea, researchers used an interferometer where neutron beams passed through silicon crystal. The crystal physically separated the neutrons and allowed them to go to two paths. Researchers reported "the system behaves as if the neutrons go through one beam path, while their magnetic moment travels along the other." A subsequent quantum optics experiment observed this behaviour on individual photons with simultaneous measurements of the photon's spatial presence in one location, and of the same photon's polarisation in a different location.
- The Cheshire Cat's grin has inspired scientists in their naming of visual phenomena. A merger of galaxy groups in the constellation Ursa Major is nicknamed "Cheshire Cat galaxy group" by Astronomers due to its suggestive appearance.
- In linguistics, cheshirization, when a sound disappears but leaves a trace, just like the cat disappears but leaves his grin.
- In Conway's Game of Life, the Cheshire Cat is a cat-like pattern which transforms into a grin in the second to last generation and a block (pawprint) in the last generation.
- A Cheshire charge is an electric charge with magnitude but no persistently identifiable polarity.
- John Archibald Wheeler, credited with popularizing the term black hole, likened it to a cosmic Cheshire Cat in a 1967 lecture for the American Association for the Advancement of Science, "Our Universe, Known and Unknown":
  [B]y reason of its faster and faster infall [the surface of the imploding star] moves away from the [distant] observer more and more rapidly. The light is shifted to the red. It becomes dimmer millisecond by millisecond, and in less than a second is too dark to see...[The star], like the Cheshire cat, fades from view. One leaves only its grin, the other, only its gravitational attraction. Gravitational attraction, yes; light, no. ... Moreover, light and particles incident from outside [and] going down the black hole only add to its mass and increase its gravitational attraction.
