= Grappenhall and Thelwall =

Civil parish in Cheshire, England

Coordinates: 53.367°N 2.547°W

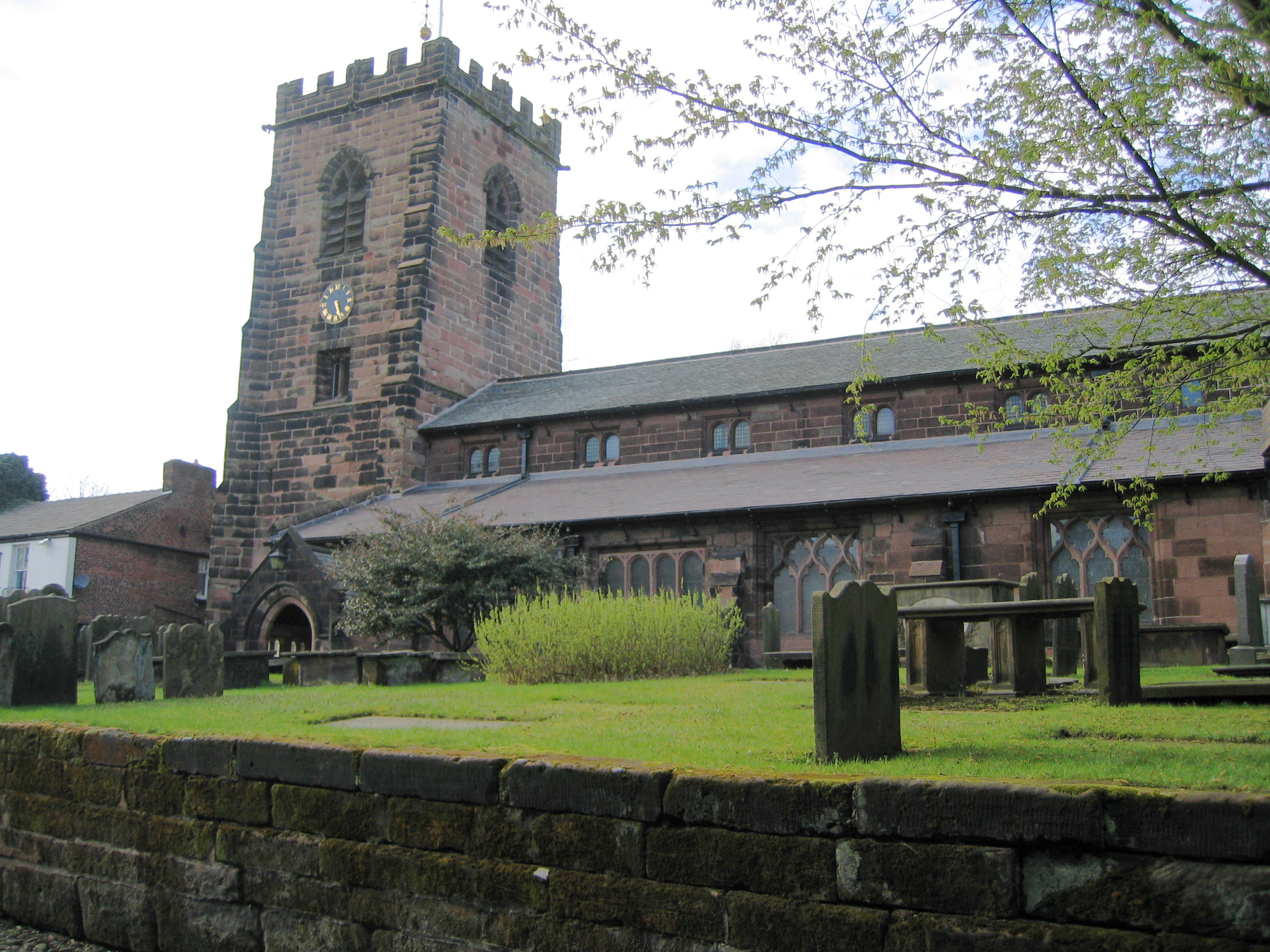
- St Wilfrid's Church, Grappenhall

- Location within Cheshire
- Population: 9,377 (2001)
- OS grid reference: SJ636857
- Civil parish: Grappenhall and Thelwall
- Unitary authority: Warrington
- Ceremonial county: Cheshire
- Region: North West
- Country: England
- Sovereign state: United Kingdom
- Post town: WARRINGTON
- Postcode district: WA4
- Dialling code: 01925
- Police: Cheshire
- Fire: Cheshire
- Ambulance: North West
- UK Parliament: Warrington South

Grappenhall and Thelwall is a civil parish within the Borough of Warrington and the ceremonial county of Cheshire in England. It has a population of 9,377.

The civil parish was formed in largely its present state in 1936, when the then Thelwall civil parish was joined in its entirety to the ancient civil parish of Grappenhall.

== Notable people ==
- Byrom Eaton (1613 in Grappenhall – 1703), an English priest; Archdeacon of Leicester
- Reg Watson (1900 in Thelwall – 1971), footballer who played 269 games, including 263 for Oldham Athletic A.F.C.
- Tim Curry (1946 in Grappenhall – 2026), an English actor and singer.
- Isabelle Amyes (born 1950 in Grappenhall), an English TV actress
- David Strettle (born 1983), a former English rugby union wing, played nearly 300 games and 14 for England rugby union team, brought up in Thelwall
- Luke Roskell (born 1997), an English actor, brought up in Grappenhall

== See also ==
- Listed buildings in Grappenhall and Thelwall
