= Grappenhall =

Village in Cheshire, England

Coordinates: 53.373°N 2.543°W

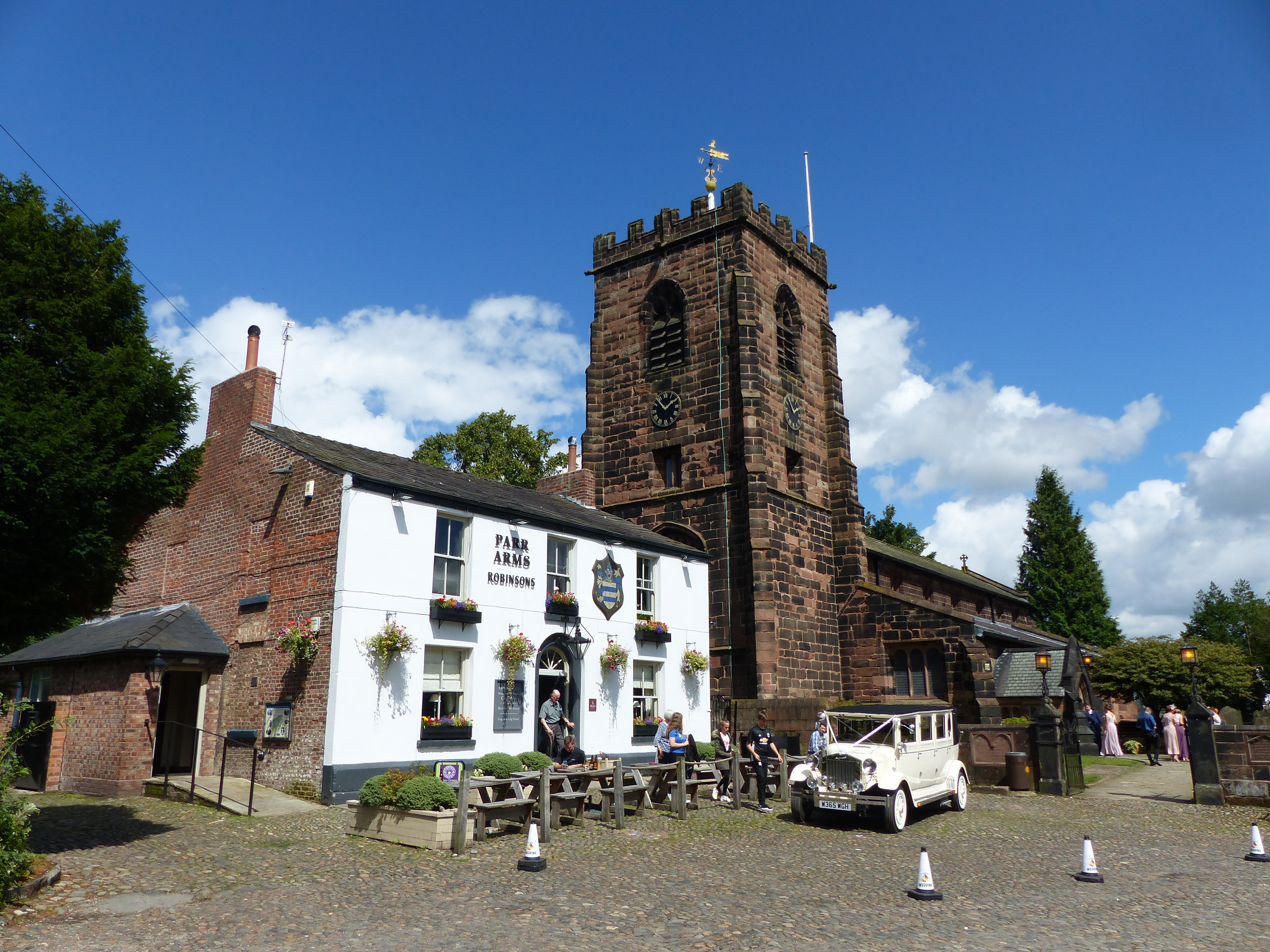
- Parr Arms and St Wilfrid's Church

- Location within Cheshire
- Population: 9,651
- OS grid reference: SJ639863
- Civil parish: Grappenhall and Thelwall
- Unitary authority: Warrington
- Ceremonial county: Cheshire
- Region: North West
- Country: England
- Sovereign state: United Kingdom
- Post town: WARRINGTON
- Postcode district: WA4
- Dialling code: 01925
- Police: Cheshire
- Fire: Cheshire
- Ambulance: North West
- UK Parliament: Warrington South

Grappenhall is a village within the civil parish of Grappenhall and Thelwall in the Borough of Warrington in Cheshire, England. The parish had a population of 9,651 at the 2021 census.

== History ==
Grappenhall is first mentioned in the Domesday Book of 1086 with the name Gropenhale and with a valuation of five shillings.

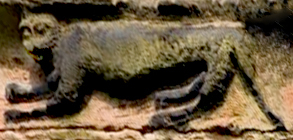
Sandstone carving of a 'Cheshire Cat', St Wilfrid's Church

St Wilfrid's Church has a carving of a cat on the west face of the tower. This may have been Lewis Carroll's inspiration for the grinning Cheshire Cat in Alice's Adventures in Wonderland. The church itself was first constructed in 1120, though was rebuilt 400 years later. The church was also, at a time, in the possession of the Boidelle (Boydell) family.

Along with the church, the centre of the village contains three pubs, the Parr Arms, the Ram's Head and the Bellhouse. The Grappenhall Hall Residential School (closed down) and St Wilfrid's Primary School and Bradshaw Community Primary School is located north of the village centre.

On 1 April 1936 the parish of Thelwall was abolished and merged with Grappenhall, on 1 April 1974 the merged parish was renamed "Grappenhall and Thelwall". In 1931 the parish of Grappenhall (prior to the merge) had a population of 2449.

== Leisure ==
Grappenhall Heys Walled Garden is near the village. Grappenhall is home to the 25th Warrington East (St Wilfred's) Scout Troop.

== Sport ==
There is a cricket ground, which is the home of Grappenhall Cricket Club. Australian cricketer Steve Smith was signed for the club for five weeks in 2007, when he was 17.

== Library ==
The Grappenhall Community library is a community-run library in the village. It was opened by the local authority in 1959 before being handed over to the Friends of Grappenhall Library after closure on 2 April 2011 due to local authority cuts. The library is run by the Friends of the Grappenhall library who pay £10 a year to help with its upkeep.

== In popular culture ==
Parts of the Case-Book of Sherlock Holmes were filmed in the centre of Grappenhall. The village name appears in the title of the song "Grappenhall Rag", by the Darwen singer-songwriter Bryn Haworth.

== Notable people ==
Grappenhall is the birthplace of actor and singer Tim Curry (1946–2026).

== See also ==
- Listed buildings in Grappenhall and Thelwall
