= St Wilfrid's Church, Grappenhall =

Coordinates: 53.3723°N 2.5434°W

Grappenhall, St Wilfrid's Church
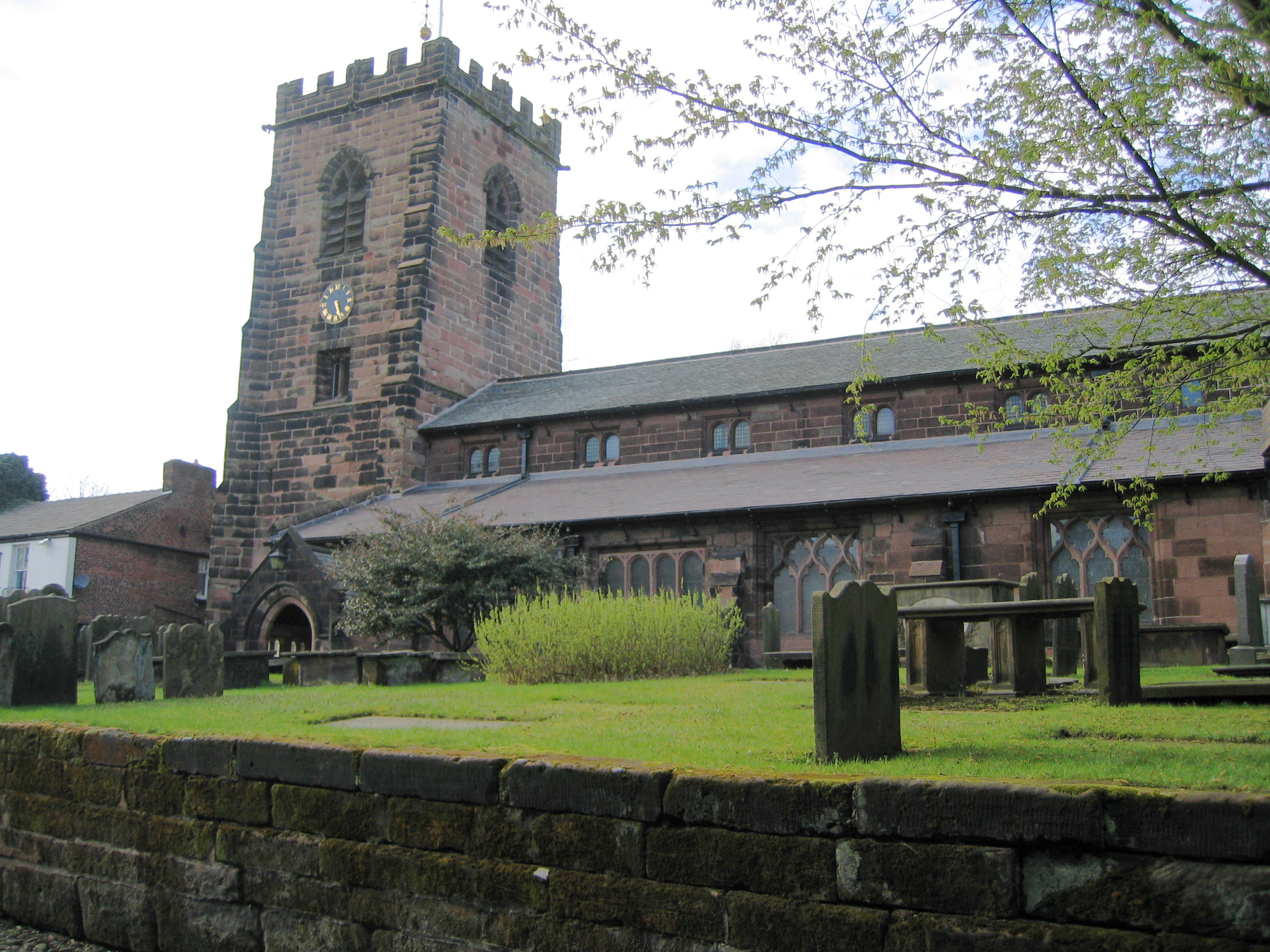
- St Wilfrid's Church, Grappenhall from the southeast

- Location in Cheshire
- OS grid reference: SJ 638,863
- Location: Grappenhall, Warrington, Cheshire
- Country: England
- Denomination: Anglican
- Website: www.stwilfridschurch.org.uk

History
- Status: Parish church
- Dedication: St Wilfrid

Architecture
- Functional status: Active
- Heritage designation: Grade I
- Designated: 8 January 1970
- Architect: Paley and Austin (restoration)
- Architectural type: Church
- Style: Norman, Gothic, Gothic Revival
- Groundbreaking: 12th century
- Completed: 1874

Specifications
- Materials: Red sandstone, slate roof

Administration
- Province: York
- Diocese: Chester
- Archdeaconry: Chester
- Deanery: Great Budworth
- Parish: Grappenhall

Clergy
- Rector: Rev'd Mark Orrell

St Wilfrid's Church is the parish church of Grappenhall, in the Borough of Warrington in Cheshire, England. It is designated by Historic England as a Grade I listed building. It is an active Anglican church in the diocese of Chester, the archdeaconry of Chester and the deanery of Great Budworth.

== History ==
The church is Norman in origin, built probably in the earlier part of the 12th century and completed about 1120. This was a small and simple church, consisting of a nave, chancel and, possibly, an apse. The foundations of this church were discovered during the 1873–74 restoration.

A chantry chapel was added by the Boydell family in 1334 in a position where the south aisle now stands. From 1529 the church was largely rebuilt in local sandstone. The old church was demolished and a new nave, chancel, north aisle and a west tower were built. In 1539 the south aisle was added, which incorporated the Boydell chapel. The south porch was added in 1641 and at this time the west wall was strengthened. In 1833 the roof of the nave was raised to form a clerestory and in the 1850s the south aisle was further extended, and a vestry was built. There was a more substantial restoration in 1873–74 by the Lancaster architects Paley and Austin, which included the provision of new floors and roofs, at a cost of about £4,000.

== Architecture ==
=== Exterior ===
The church is built in red sandstone with a slate roof. Its plan consists of a west tower, a continuous nave and chancel of seven bays with a clerestory, north and south aisles, a chapel at the east end of the south aisle, a vestry and a south porch. The tower is in three stages, with a Tudor west door, and a four-light west window. It has diagonal west buttresses and square east buttresses. In the middle stage are small windows, above which are clock faces and bell openings. On the summit is a crenellated parapet. The tower is about 76 feet (23 m) high. The chancel east window is in Perpendicular style. The east window in the north aisle (formerly in the chancel) has five lights. The clerestory windows are paired and round-arched. Included in the internal fabric of the wall of the south aisle is a remnant of a Norman corbel table decorated with crudely carved human heads.

=== Interior ===
Built into the east wall of the north aisle are a piscina and a credence table. Inside the church are a holy table dated 1641, and the royal coat of arms of Queen Anne. In the chancel is an effigy of Sir William Boydell, who died in 1275. This was brought in from the churchyard in 1874 and restored. The reredos is carved in oak and is based on The Last Supper. The font dates from the Norman era, or earlier, and was rediscovered in March 1873 during the restoration of the church.

A window in the south aisle includes 14th-century glass which was rearranged in 1834 and depicts seven saints. Other windows in the aisle were made by Meyer of Munich. There are fragments of medieval glass elsewhere in the church. There is a ring of ten bells. Two non ringing bells were cast by Henry Bagley II of Chacombe around 1700. The 10 active bells were hung in 2019 and cast by John Taylor & Co. The parish registers date from 1573.

== External features ==
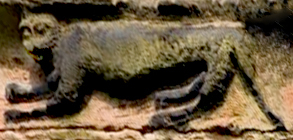
Sandstone carving of 'Cheshire Cat'

On the outside of the church, immediately below the west window, is a carving of a cat and it is suggested that this might be the origin of the Cheshire Cat. A sundial in the churchyard is dated 1714 and is listed at Grade II. At set of stocks at the entrance to the churchyard, also listed at Grade II, have endstones probably dating from the 17th century. The churchyard also contains five war graves of British service personnel, two from World War I and three from World War II.

== Live at St Wilfrid's ==
A series of concerts of classical music entitled Live at St Wilfrid's is hosted by the church, and includes performances by both young artists and by performers with international reputations.

== See also ==
- Grade I and II* listed buildings in Warrington
- Grade I listed churches in Cheshire
- Norman architecture in Cheshire
- List of ecclesiastical works by Paley and Austin
