= North West Regional Assembly =

- Formation: 1999
- Dissolved: 2008
- Legal status: Regional chamber
- Headquarters: Wigan
- Region served: North West England
- Budget: (2006/07)

The North West Regional Assembly (NWRA) was the regional chamber for the North West England region of the England. It was based at Wigan, in Greater Manchester. It was abolished in July 2008.

== Creation and functions ==
The assembly was created by the Regional Development Agencies Act 1998. The first meeting was held in 1999. In July 2003 the assembly was reconstituted to combine its existing functions with those of the regional arm of the Local Government Association and of the Regional Employers Organisation.

The NWRA acted as the representative voice of the region and worked to promote the economic, environmental and social well-being of the North West of England. The key functions of the assembly were:

- Co-ordinate the public expenditure of local authorities
- Act as regional planning body
- Scrutinise the work of the Northwest Regional Development Agency

== Abolition ==
Following criticism of the regional assemblies, it was proposed in July 2007 that they will be axed, losing their role by 2010.

A regional leaders forum known as '4NW' was established on 15 July 2008 and the NWRA ceased to exist.

== Organisation ==
Membership of the NWRA was not by direct election. The NWRA represented the interests of Cumbria, Cheshire, Lancashire, Greater Manchester and Merseyside and had 80 members nominated by Local Authorities, business, trade unions, further and higher education, environmental interests, and the voluntary, cultural and community sectors including sport and tourism.

=== Senior Officers ===
Position	Holder
Chief Executive	Phil Robinson
Director of Planning, Transport and Housing	Michael Gallagher
Director of Strategy - Scrutiny, Europe and Sustainability	Steve Barwick

=== NWRA Political Group Leaders ===
Political Group	Leader	Local Authority
Conservatives Group	Cllr Les Byrom	Sefton Metropolitan Borough Council
Liberal Democrat Group	Cllr Mike Ash	Cumbria County Council
Labour Group	Cllr Val Stevens	Manchester City Council
