= Castlefield Forum =

English non-profit organisation

One of the signs displayed by the organisation in the Castlefield area in Manchester

The Castlefield Forum is a non-profit charitable incorporated organisation supported by the voluntary work of residents of Castlefield, Manchester, England. The Forum was formed as a side effect of resident opposition to the proposed development of Jacksons Wharf (which was rejected). The pub building was retained and is now The Wharf.

Initially, the group was formed as an interface between Manchester City Council, residents, and local businesses. to ensure mutual understanding of priorities and to drive deeper community engagement. Since then, the forum has developed to become more proactive by successfully obtaining a number of cash grants from the City Council for improvements in the area. These include securing funding for an upgrade to the information boards in the neighbourhood, and the addition of new boards with extended information; improvements to the green public spaces; and landscaping of the Roman Gardens next to the arena.
