= Castlefield =

Conservation area in Manchester, England

Coordinates: 53.475°N 2.255°W

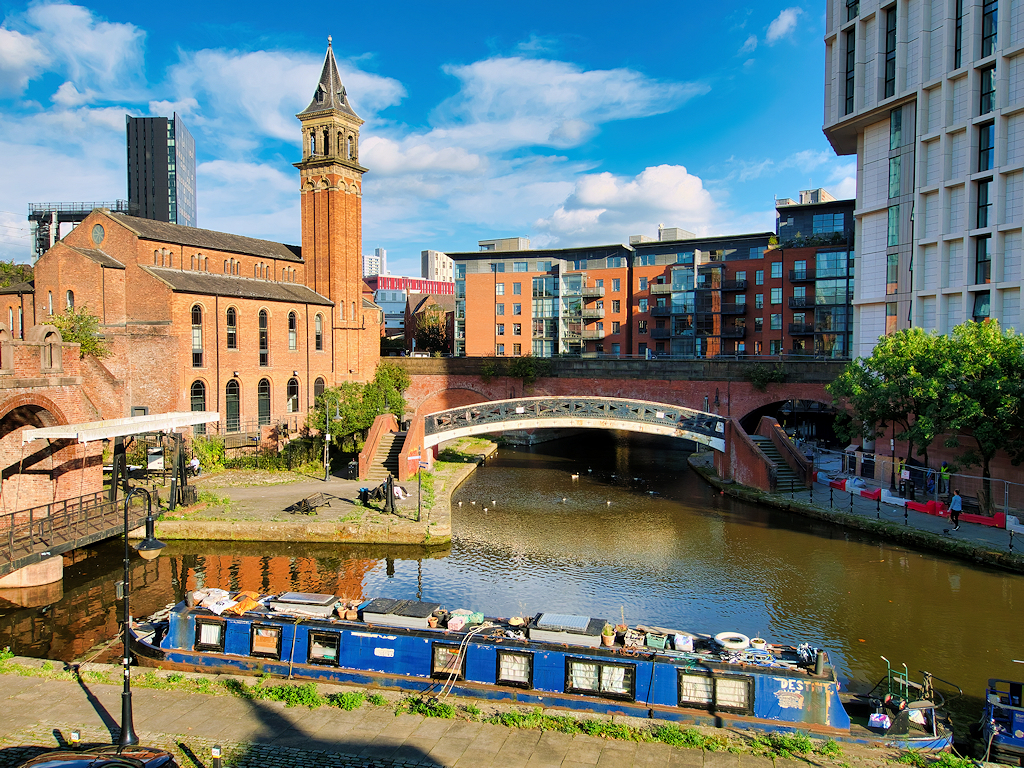
- Castlefield, Central Manchester

- Location within Greater Manchester
- OS grid reference: SJ830976
- Metropolitan borough: Manchester
- Metropolitan county: Greater Manchester
- Region: North West
- Country: England
- Sovereign state: United Kingdom
- Post town: MANCHESTER
- Postcode district: M3
- Dialling code: 0161
- Police: Greater Manchester
- Fire: Greater Manchester
- Ambulance: North West

Castlefield is an inner-city conservation area in Manchester, North West England. The conservation area which bears its name is bounded by the River Irwell, Quay Street, Deansgate and Chester Road. It was the site of the Roman era fort of Mamucium or Mancunium which gave its name to Manchester. It was the terminus of the Bridgewater Canal, the world's first industrial canal, built in 1764; the oldest canal warehouse opened in 1779. The world's first passenger railway terminated here in 1830, at Liverpool Road railway station and the first railway warehouse opened here in 1831.

The Rochdale Canal met the Bridgewater Canal at Castlefield in 1805 and in the 1830s they were linked with the Mersey and Irwell Navigation by two short cuts. In 1848 the two viaducts of the Manchester, South Junction and Altrincham Railway crossed the area and joined each other, two further viaducts and one mainline station Manchester Central railway station followed. It has a tram station, Deansgate-Castlefield tram stop (formerly G-Mex) providing frequent Manchester Metrolink services to Eccles, Bury, Altrincham, Manchester Piccadilly, East Didsbury and Rochdale.

Castlefield was designated a conservation area in 1980 and the United Kingdom's first designated urban heritage park in 1982.

== Toponymy ==
The name Castlefield refers to the settlement's position below the former Roman fort. It is a contracted version of the earlier name Castle-in-the-field. Another name for the area was Campfield, which derived from the same source. It is preserved in the name of St Matthew's Church, Campfield, and Campfield Market. (Manchester also derived its name from the fort.)

An older name for the settlement was the Old English Aldport, meaning old or long used port, distinguishing it from the new port at medieval Manchester nearer the confluence of the Rivers Irk and Irwell. Port in Old English could refer to a harbour or a market so the names could be old and new market.

== History ==
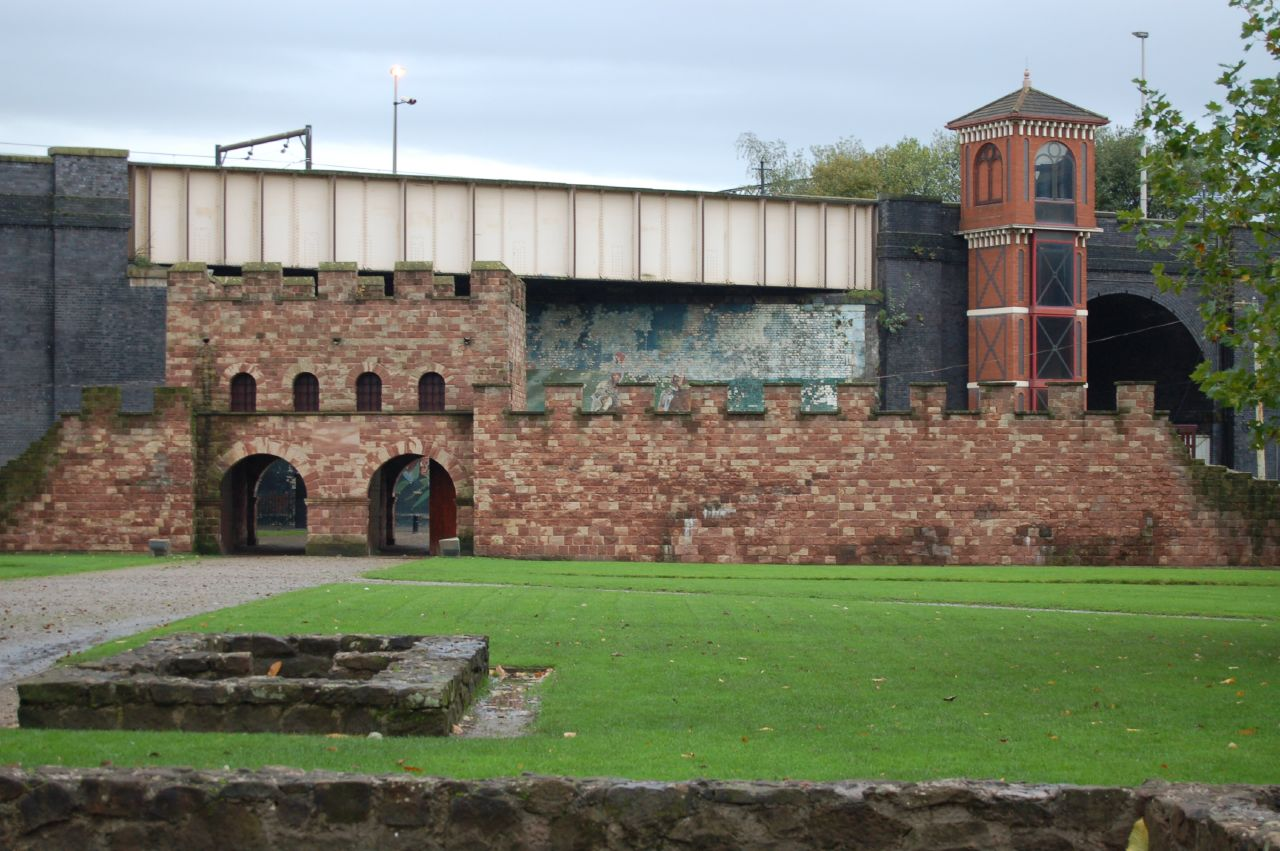
The part-rebuilt Roman fort

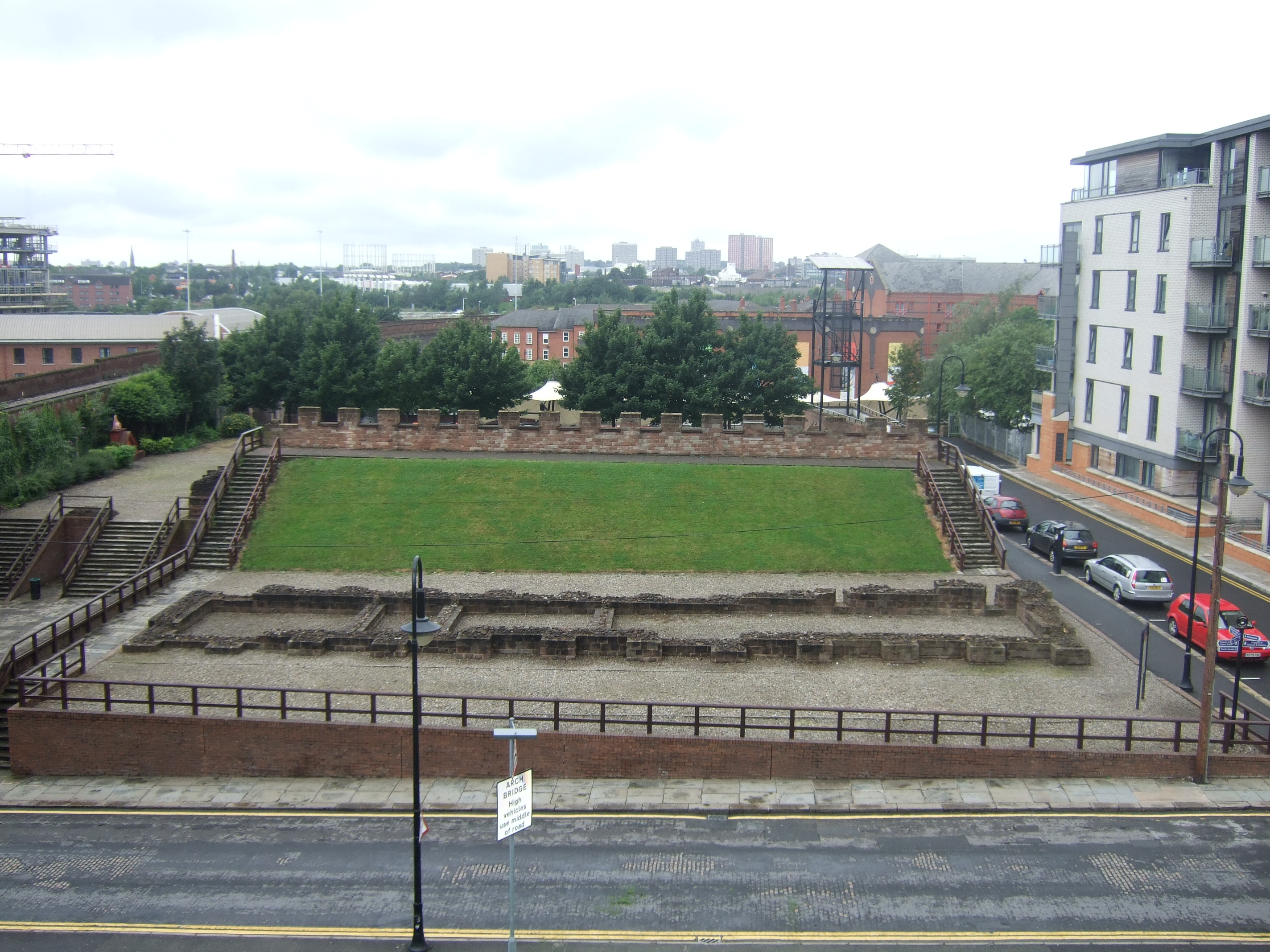
The reconstructed Roman fort wall of Mamucium

=== Roman period ===
A Roman fort (castra), Mamucium or Mancunium was established in what is now Castlefield around AD 79 near a crossing place on the River Medlock. The fort was sited on a sandstone bluff near the confluence of the River Medlock and Irwell in a naturally defensible position. It was erected as a series of fortifications established by Gnaeus Julius Agricola during his campaign against the Brigantes, who were the Celtic tribe in control of most of northern England. It guarded a central stage of the Roman road (equivalent to Watling Street), between Deva Victrix (Chester) and Eboracum (York). Another road branched off to the north to Bremetennacum (Ribchester). The neighbouring forts were Castleshaw and Northwich. Built first from turf and timber, the fort was demolished around 140. When it was rebuilt around 160, it was again of turf and timber construction. Around the year 200, the fort underwent another rebuild enhancing its defences by replacing the gatehouse in stone and facing the walls with stone. The fort would have been garrisoned by an infantry cohort of around 500 auxiliary troops.

Evidence of pagan and Christian worship has been discovered. Two altars have been found and there may be a temple of Mithras at the site. A word square was discovered in the 1970s that may be one of the earliest evidences of Christianity in Britain. A civilian settlement (vicus) grew in association with the fort, made up of traders and the soldiers' families. An area which has a concentration of furnaces and industrial activity has been described as an industrial estate. The civilian settlement was probably abandoned by the mid-3rd century, although a small garrison may have remained at Mamucium into the late third and early fourth centuries.

A reconstructed part of the fort stands on the site and is open to the public.

=== Medieval and early modern periods ===
The village of Manchester later became established a kilometre to the north and the area around the vicus became known as "Aldport" or "The Old Town". A house and park here became the home of the Mosley family in 1601 but, in 1642, after being used by Lord Strange as a royalist headquarters during the Siege of Manchester, it was burned down by parliamentarians.

The River Irwell was made navigable in 1720s, leading to the construction of a quay in the area for loading and unloading of goods (vessels of up to 50 tons could dock here and ply between Manchester and Liverpool).

=== Industrialisation ===
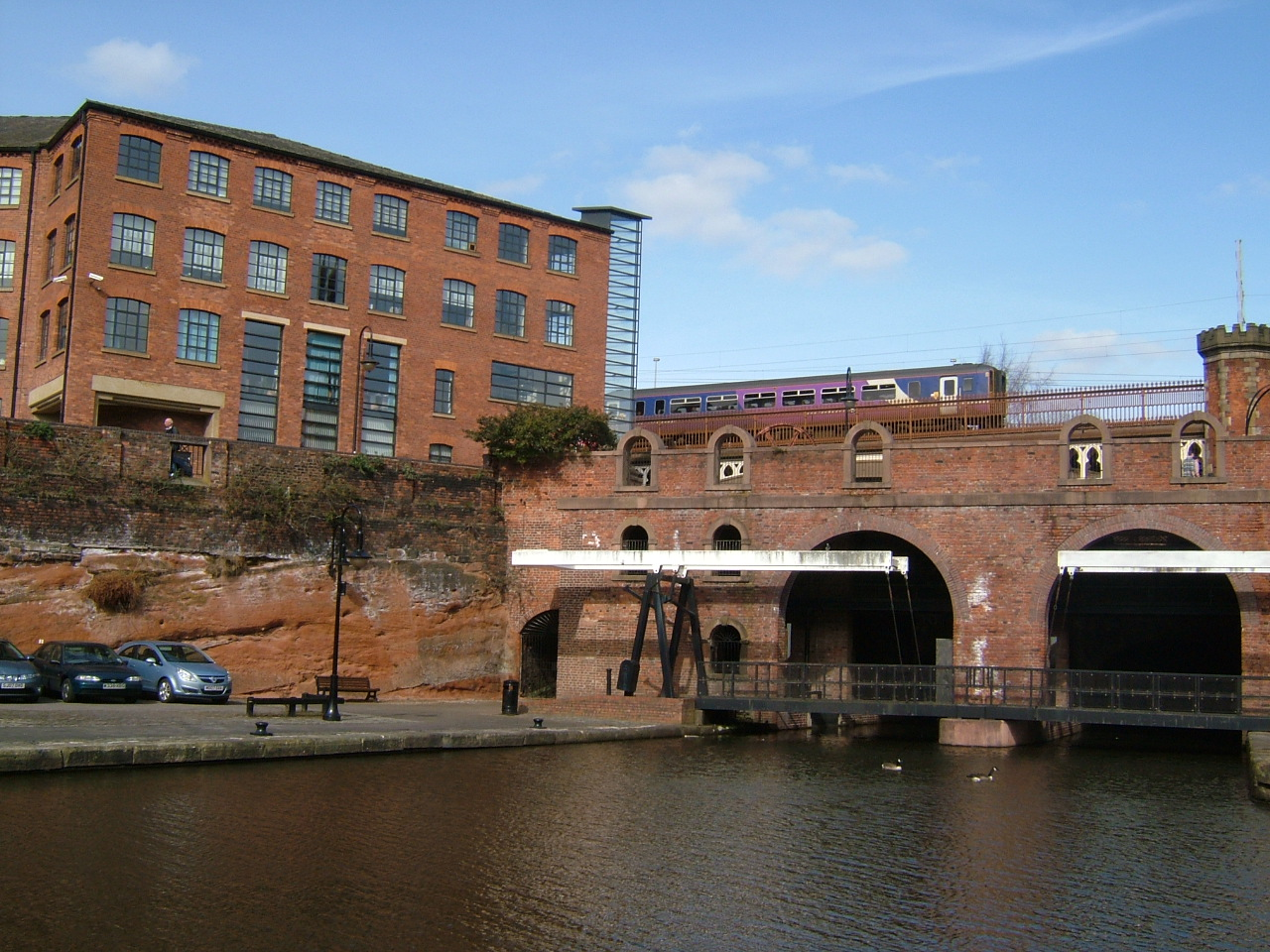
Bridgewater Canal & Grocer's Warehouse Ruins

The Bridgewater Canal arrived in Castlefield in July 1761, around the time the Industrial Revolution is considered to have started. The Rochdale Canal, and a network of private branch canals joined the Bridgewater at Lock 92 in Castlefield. The Bridgewater Canal company hesitated in connecting their canal the adjacent Mersey and Irwell Navigation until the Rochdale Canal Company had almost constructed its Manchester and Salford Junction Canal, and the railways had arrived in the 1830s. As the century progressed the canals gave way to the railways and the area became dissected by a network of railway lines carried on a series of multi-arch viaducts. Though Castlefield did have cotton mills, it was the engineering works and warehousing that was more noticeable. The first canal warehouse, built in 1771 on Coal Wharf, was used to raise coal from the barges to street level, and store other goods. In the nineteenth century the warehouses assumed other functions such as trans-shipment which involved receiving trains or barges, and reassembling their loads to be shipped to other destinations. Other warehouses received raw materials such as yarn, which was collected by outworkers who then returned woven cloth. The later warehouses acted as showrooms on the ground floors, with offices and storage above and behind.

=== 20th century ===
During the 20th century both canal and railway transport declined and the area became somewhat derelict. The railway complex in Liverpool Road was sold to a conservation group for a nominal £1 and became the Greater Manchester Museum of Science and Industry. In 1982 the area was designated as an urban heritage park and a part of the fort was reconstructed on the excavated foundations.

== Present day ==
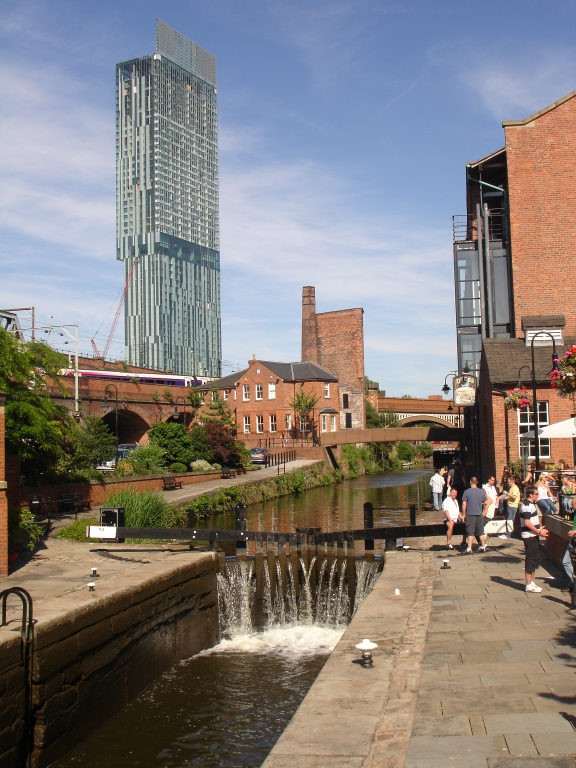
Bridgewater Canal with the Beetham Tower

As part of the renewal of the site, an extensive outdoor area was developed as an events arena which is used for a wide variety of events, including the annual 'Dpercussion' music festival. Granada Television studios are located in the area along with the now closed Granada Studios Tour. In 2008 it was reported that ITV were considering re-opening the tour as the company is searching for new forms of revenue to restore growth.

Castlefield has several bars and restaurants which are particularly popular during the summer months when people flock to the area to enjoy the large outdoor drinking areas and regular live music events. The popular Barça Bar (originally opened by Mik Hucknall, Simply Red) and Dukes 92 serve as the only bars with huge outdoor seating, within the Castlefield basin. There are then The Wharf (gastro pub) and The Arches Castlefield (above Barça Bar) that serve food and offer event space.

Castle Quay is the home of Bauer Media's network centre, housing national radio stations Hits Radio and Greatest Hits Radio.

Planning permission to turn the empty Jackson's Wharf building into a modern five-storey block of flats by the Peel Group was rejected for a second time in 2008. In 2011, planning permission was rejected again by Manchester City Council with opposition from locals. Peel subsequently decided to sell the building and it is now a gastropub.

In 1996 an architectural design competition was launched to create Timber Wharf by developers Urban Splash and RIBA Competitions to design a new housing type capable of being mass-produced, using modern building techniques on a realistic budget to challenge the preconceived notions of volume house building. 162 entries were submitted for the project and Glenn Howells Architects provided the winning entry, the building was completed in 2002 and has since gone on to win a number of awards.

== Geography ==
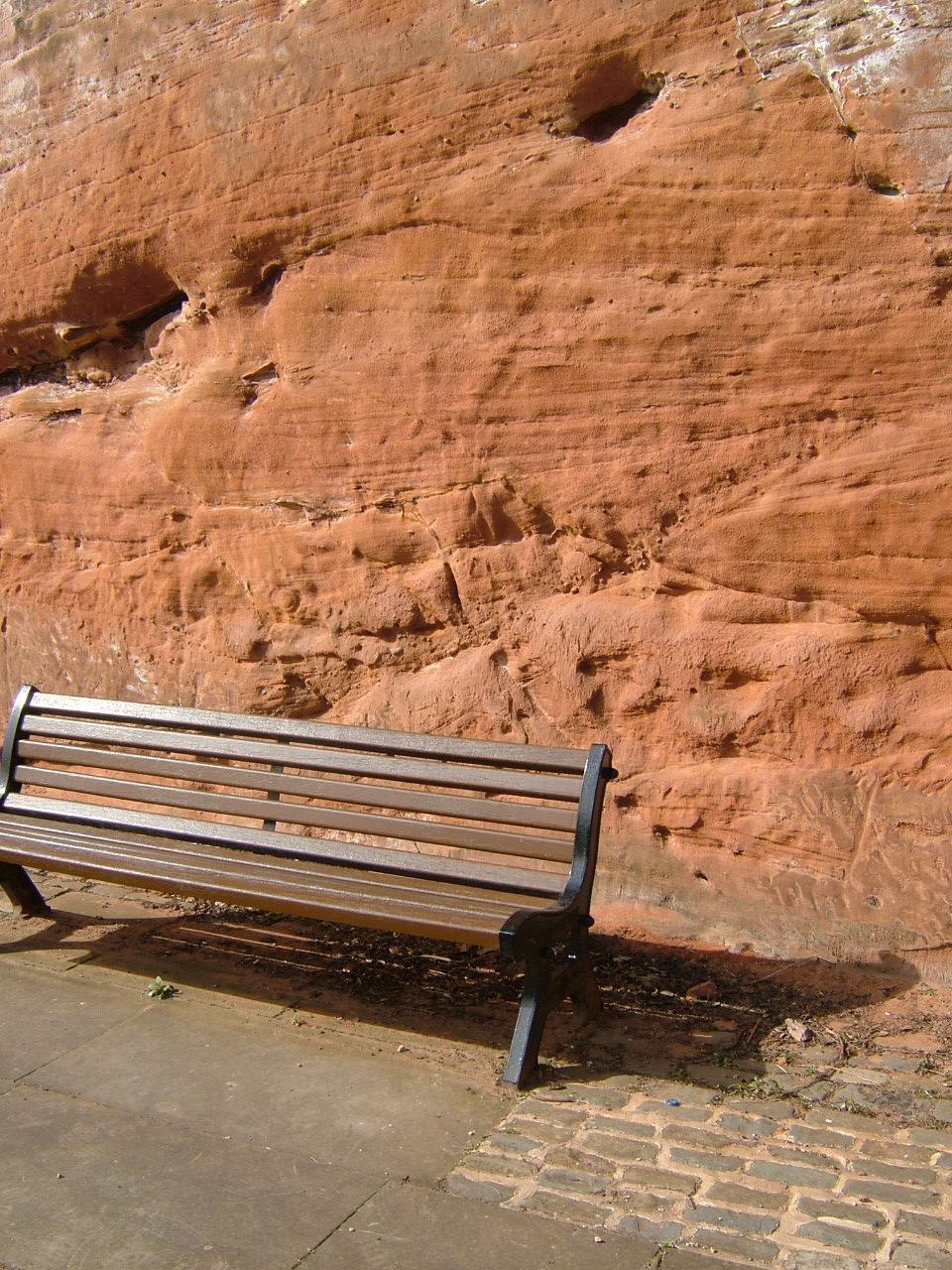
Sandstone cliff in Castlefield

Castlefield is in the Deansgate ward, in Manchester City Centre. To the west is the River Irwell and Salford, to the south lie the Bridgewater Canal, the River Medlock and the Rochdale Canal.

The land between the two rivers consists primarily of a plateau of Collyhurst sandstone, which is deep red in colour. This can be seen in the exposed river cliffs around the Castlefield basin, and provides a solid foundation for multistorey buildings and also an easily workable rock for cutting culverts and tunnels.

Area description

The River Medlock makes an end-on connection with the Bridgewater Canal at Knott Mill Bridge. Originally surplus water was diverted, via a tippler weir, into an overflow tunnel passing under the basin and emerging just to the north of the overspill from the Giant's Basin. The tippler weir has been replaced with a conventional weir within the basin. The 1848 OS large scale map shows the original course as following the line of the canal as far as the coal wharf (site of the Giant's Basin). The River Irwell forms two gigantic meanders around Manchester and Salford; these too have had to be heavily controlled, for the Irwell was straightened and deepened from 1724, forming the Mersey and Irwell Navigation with quays built along Water Street in 1740. Most of the navigation was abandoned in the 1890s, with the construction of the Manchester Ship Canal but a deep water channel was maintained up to the Woden Street footbridge. Two canals define Castlefield: the Bridgewater built in 1761 and the Rochdale opened in 1804. There are however two more short canals within Castlefield that form links with the Irwell, these are the Manchester and Salford Junction Canal and the Hulme Locks Branch Canal, both being disused but both are still visible. The Bridgewater Hall basin on the former has been restored. Over the Irwell from Water Street is the entrance to the Manchester, Bolton & Bury Canal.

== Landmarks ==
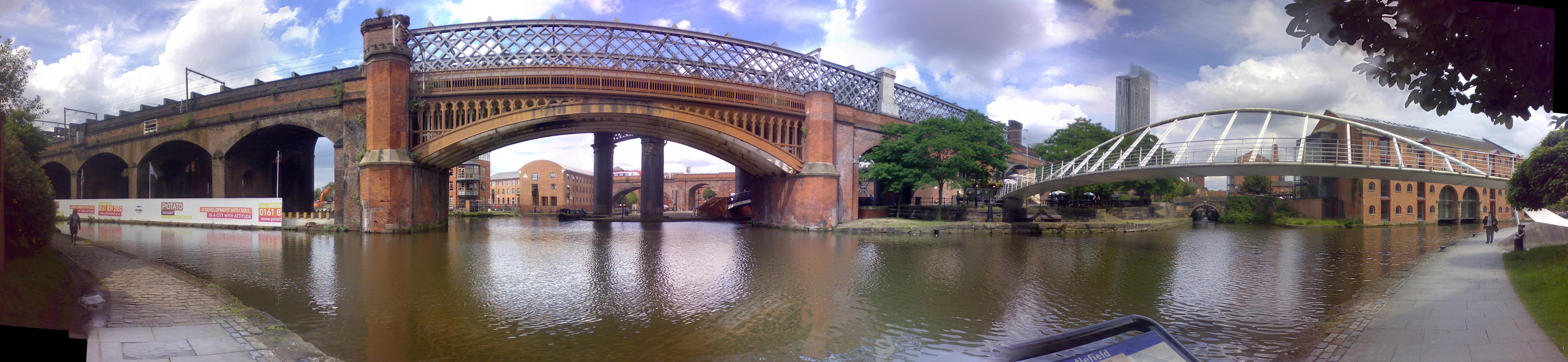
A panorama of Castlefield over the Bridgewater Canal

=== Canals ===
The navigations, canals, roads and railways of Manchester

Before 1750, roads were an impractical way of transporting heavy goods and water transport on the rivers was the accepted method. The number of suitable rivers was limited. Power to drive machinery was also derived from water but this needed fast-flowing streams where a head could be built up to turn the waterwheels. Finding the two types of water at the same locality was rare. Castlefield could use the River Medlock, as it fell to join the River Irwell to turn the wheels, but the Irwell needed to be improved to make it a safe river to navigate.

Eight locks were constructed between 1724 and 1734, along the Rivers Irwell and Mersey; this was known as the Mersey and Irwell Navigation. Short cuts were dug to eliminate the difficult bends. Wharfs were built at Manchester Wharf, Water Street in 1740, and if the wind was not in the east small boats could travel from there to the sea. The navigation was subject to continuous improvement and was eventually superseded by the Manchester Ship Canal.

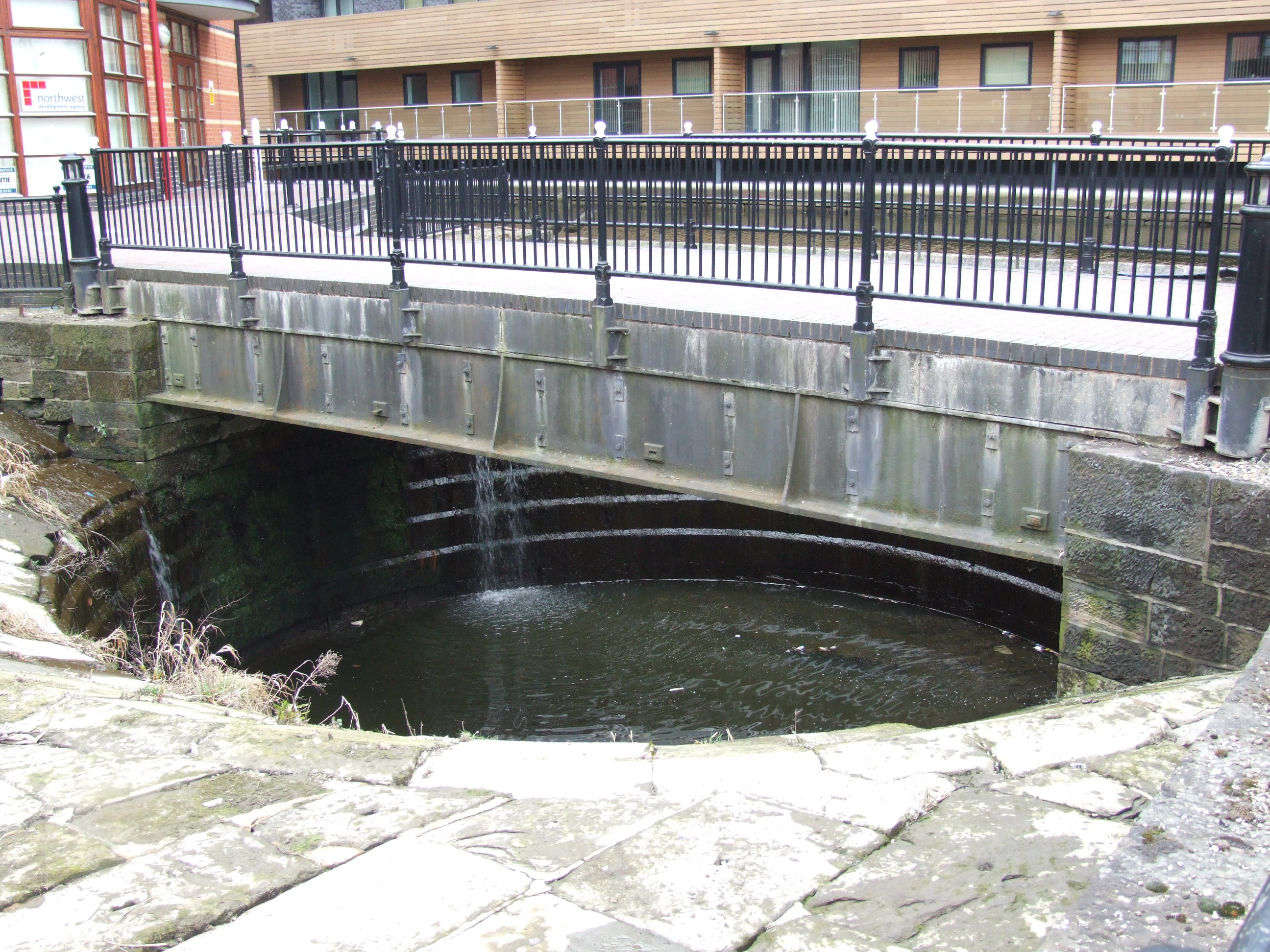
The "Giant's Basin. Today this is a circular structure 7m deep with a foot bridge.

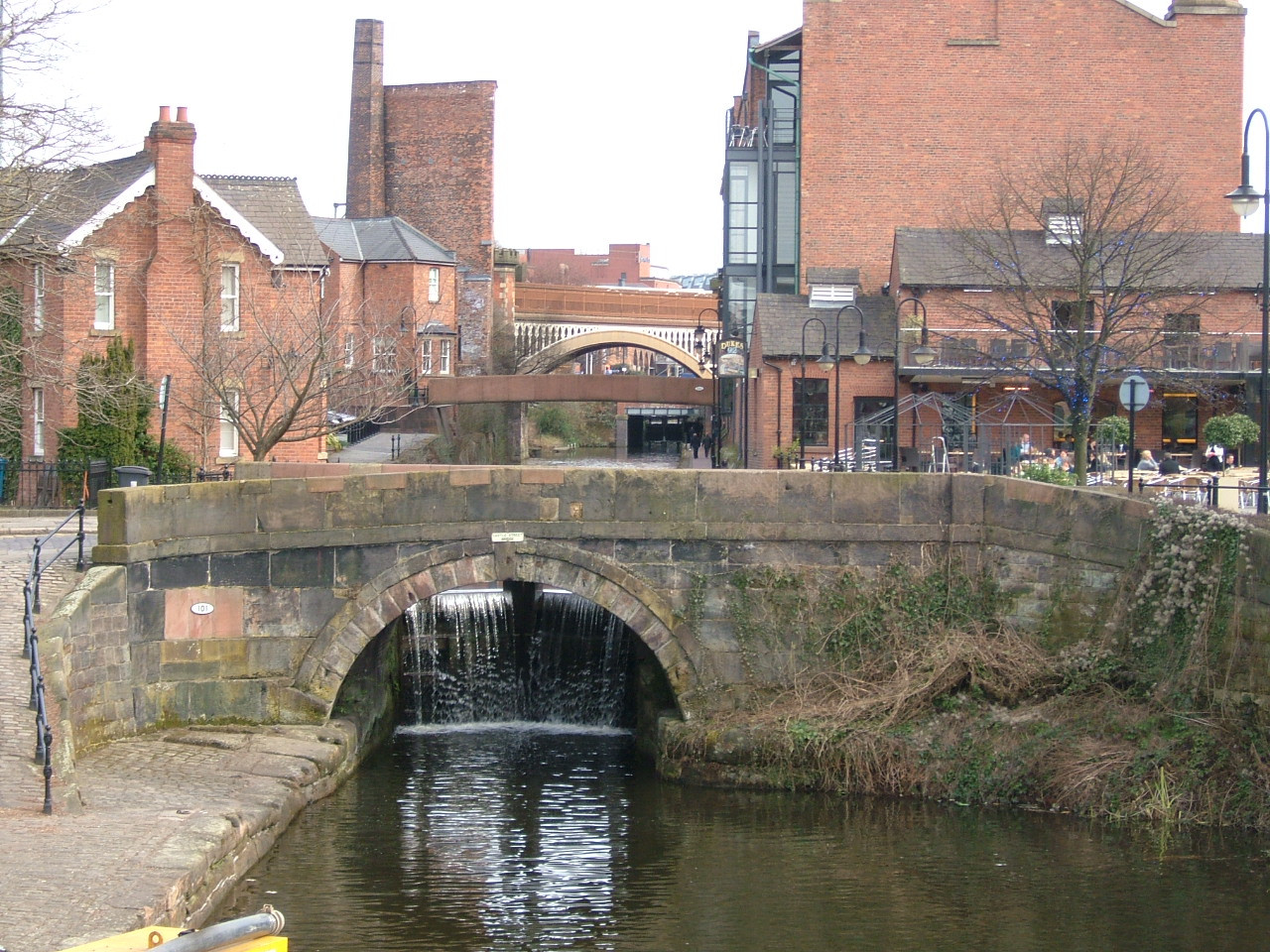
The Rochdale Canal enters the Basin, under the Castle Street Bridge, behind is lock 92.

The Bridgewater Canal was commissioned by Francis Egerton, 3rd Duke of Bridgewater, to transport coal from his mines in Worsley to Manchester. It was built by James Brindley and is the world's first true industrial canal, and Britain's first arterial canal. It opened to Castlefield in 1761 and fully to Liverpool in 1766. Castlefield was the Manchester basin, and it was watered by the River Medlock. The actual river was culverted under the basin and emerged by Potato Wharf, then flowed into the Irwell at Hulme Locks. The basin also was watered by ground water runoff, and in times of heavy rain, a weir was needed to maintain the water level. Brindley built a clover leaf-shaped weir which was replaced by the Giant's Basin. Today this appears as a 7-metre-deep, 7-metre-wide circular sump, crossed by an iron footbridge. The basin allowed other goods to be transported into the city such as cotton (from 1784) and building materials and foodstuffs. The basin, and the proximate Bridgewater Canal Basin at Potato Wharf are Grade II listed structures.

In 1802 the Rochdale Canal joined here at Duke's Lock, lock 92; this was the first canal to cross the Pennines; it brought with it clean water from its feeder reservoir at Hollingworth Lake. It connected with the Ashton Canal and the Peak Forest Canal bringing building limestone from Bugsworth in Derbyshire. At that time, major warehouses and mills would cut private canal arms to their buildings, the Rochdale had a number of them.

In 1837, the Manchester, Bolton and Bury Canal was connected to the Irwell, and there was commercial pressure to connect the Bridgewater/Rochdale to them. The Manchester and Salford Junction Canal, 1837, was cut from the Rochdale under the city to provide the link with the Irwell at Quay street. To preempt this, the Bridgewater Canal Company built the Hulme Locks Branch Canal, completing it in 1831. This canal remained open until 1991, when it was replaced by a lock at Pomona No. 3 basin.

These canals did not have the capacity to take boats larger than 1.4 m wide, so trans-shipment to oceangoing vessels was needed at a point outside the city. The Manchester Ship Canal, the 36-mile (58 km) long river navigation was designed to give the city of Manchester direct access to the sea, and was built between 1887 and 1894 at a cost of about £15 million (£1.27 billion as of 2010), and in its day was the largest navigation canal in the world. Though the main docks were at Salford Quays and Pomona Docks the ship canal started at the Woden Street footbridge at Hulme Locks.

=== Warehouses of Castlefield ===
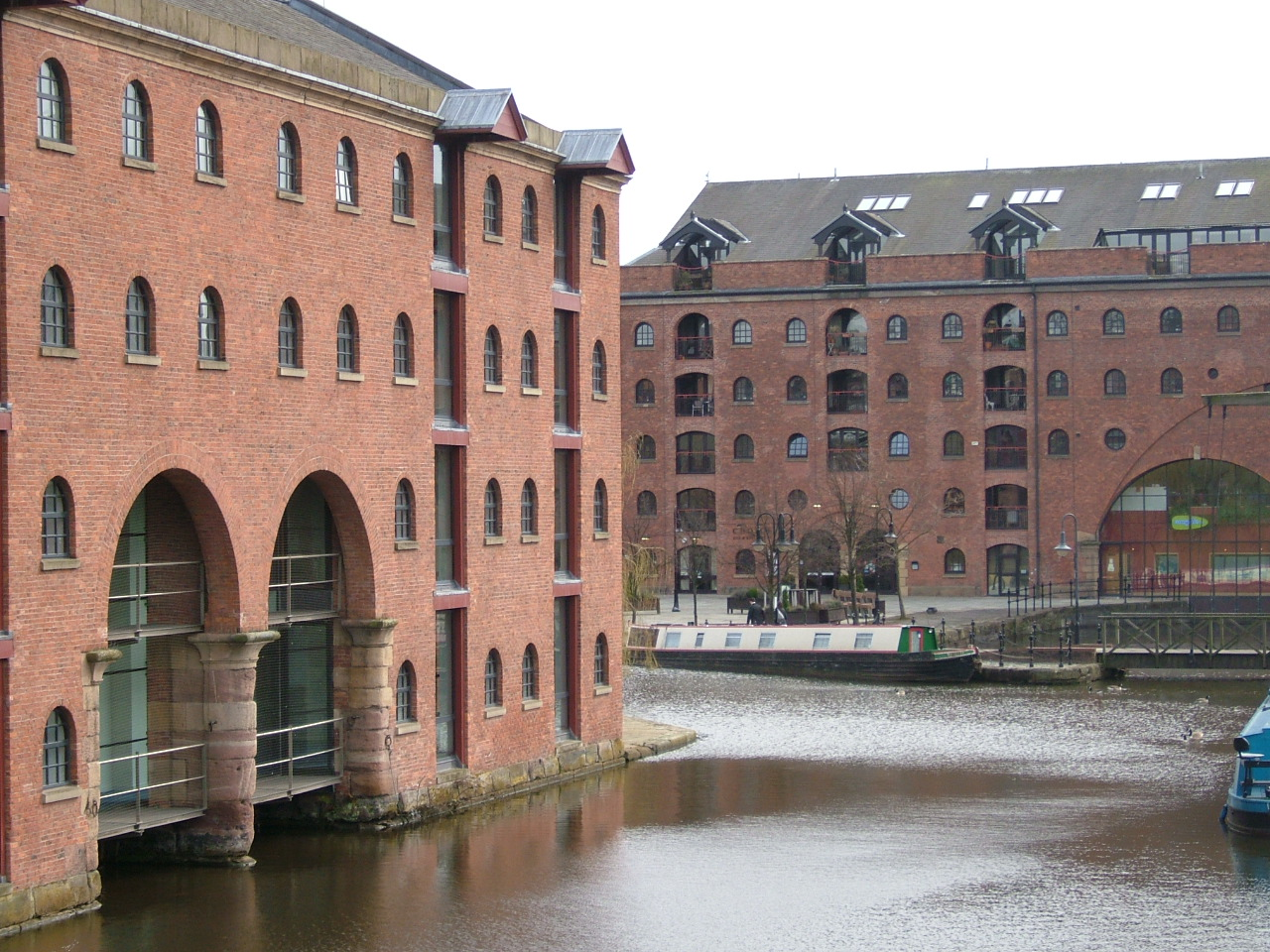
The restored Merchants' Warehouse with the Middle Warehouse behind

The Duke's Warehouse was built at the end Bridgewater Canal over the River Medlock. It has long since gone. It was first built in 1771, destroyed by fire in 1789 and rebuilt and extended including a fulling mill on the southern bank and cottages on the northern bank. It was destroyed again by fire in 1919. Built at the same time was the Grocers Warehouse 19.4 x 9.7m. This was a five-storey warehouse with one then two shipping holes. It was cut back into the Collyhurst sandstone river cliff face to the north of the Medlock. It was designed by James Brindley and incorporated a waterwheel driven hoist system. The canal arm was continued into a tunnel in the cliff. It was modified and extended in the first decade of the 19th century when the Rochdale canal was cut behind it. The tunnel was severed and became an arm of the Rochdale Canal. Part of the facade has been restored and the canal arms are bridged by two Dutch style lifting bridges.

The Merchants' Warehouse (46.2 m x 15.4m) was built on the north bank at the entrance to the Giant's Basin around 1827. This was a four-storey warehouse with two shipping holes. On the street side it had six side loading bays topped by wooden catsheads (hoods). It has been badly damaged by fire but has since been rebuilt by Jim Ramsbottom and converted into offices. The other surviving warehouse is the Middle Warehouse built in 1831 by the Bridgewater Trustees on the south bank, off the Middle Basin canal arm. It was in use to store maize until the 1970s. It has been converted into a restaurant, offices and flats. It is five storeys plus an attic. The two shipping holes are enclosed in an elliptical blind arch.

The Kenworthy Warehouse, was 19m x 47m was built in 1840 and looked like others. It was six storeys high, had twin shipping hole and was built on an arm running east of the Giant's Basin. It was designed for heavy goods: the ground floor was used for oil, the first for shipping goods, then the other floors for cotton, flour and grain. In 1897, the Great Northern Viaduct was built over it and the piers modified the canal arms.

The Staffordshire Warehouse sat abridge the Staffordshire arms of the basin and was used to warehouse cotton.

The New Warehouse was built on Slate Wharf before 1848, and was the largest. It was six storeys high, with 20 14 ft bays thus 280 ft (85 m) in length.

The Victoria and Albert Warehouses are not at the basin, but at the junction of the River Irwell and the Manchester and Salford Junction Canal. This L-shaped building was built flush with the canal for direct loading, on the street side there were three loading entrances.

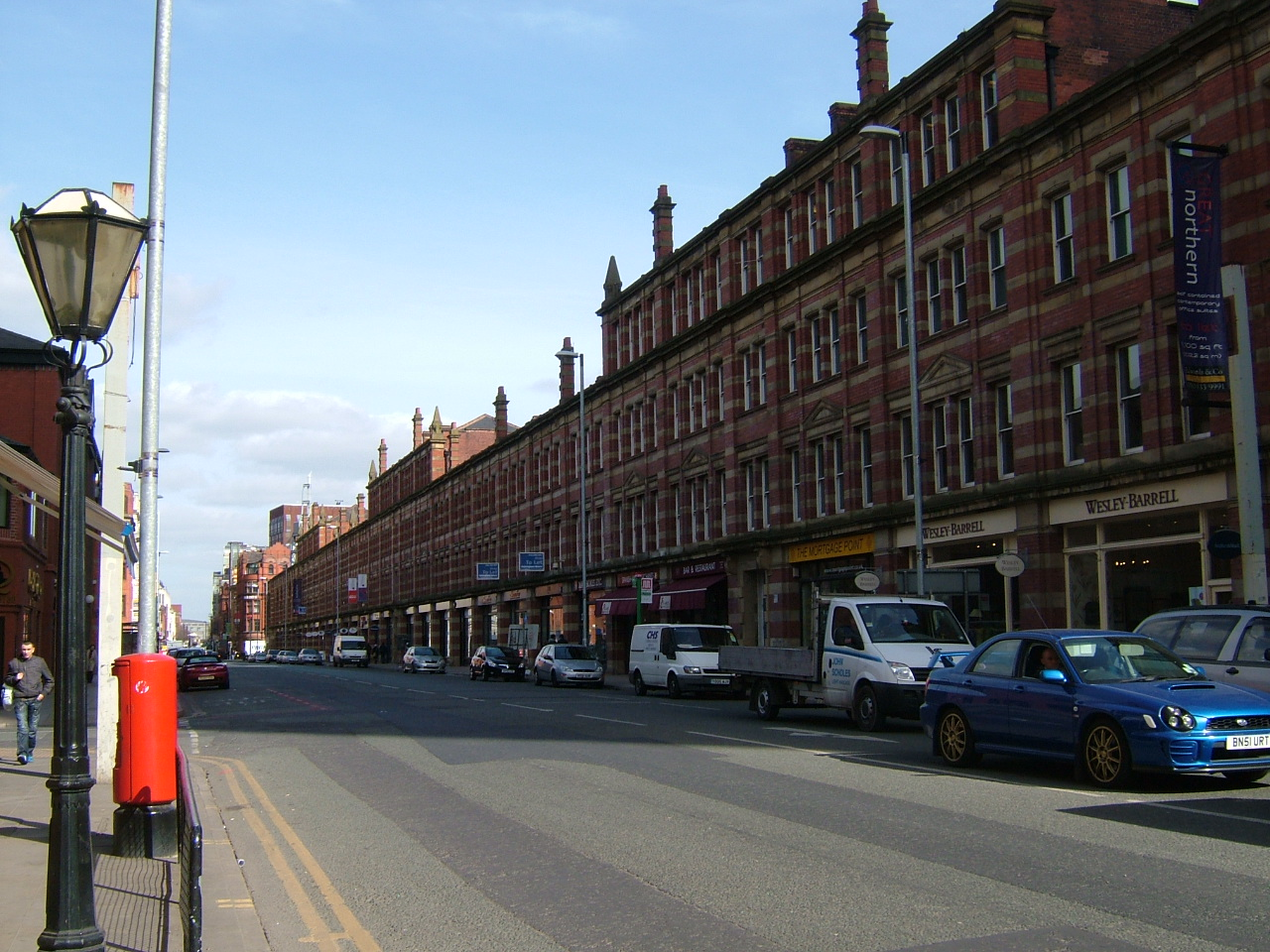
This commercial terrace masks the Great Northern Railway Company's trans-shipment warehouse.

Also significant is the 1830 Railway Warehouse of the Liverpool and Manchester Railway. This was built with There was no available water to drive the hoists, so for the first year they were manual, but in 1832 they were powered by a small steam engine.

Possibly the last of Castlefield's great warehouses was the Great Northern Warehouse of 1896 to 1898. This was a trans-shipment warehouse that had railway access on two of its floors, road access and canal arms from the Manchester and Salford Junction canal in the basement. This was one of Britain's first large steel-framed buildings (81m x 66m). There were hydraulic lifts capable of raising fully laden railway waggons between the floors. To service the building the Great Northern Viaduct was built parallel to the Cornbrook Viaduct over the basin, and over the Kenworthy Warehouse. The country's longest Victorian commercial terrace was built to mask it from Deansgate.

Textile warehouses in the Italianate palazzo style were built in other parts of Manchester city centre, notably King Street in the 1840s spreading to Portland Street, Charlotte Street and by the start of the 20th century, Whitworth Street. In all covering over a square mile of the city centre, Manchester was called Warehouse City and arguably was the finest example of Victorian commercialism.

=== Bridges of Castlefield ===
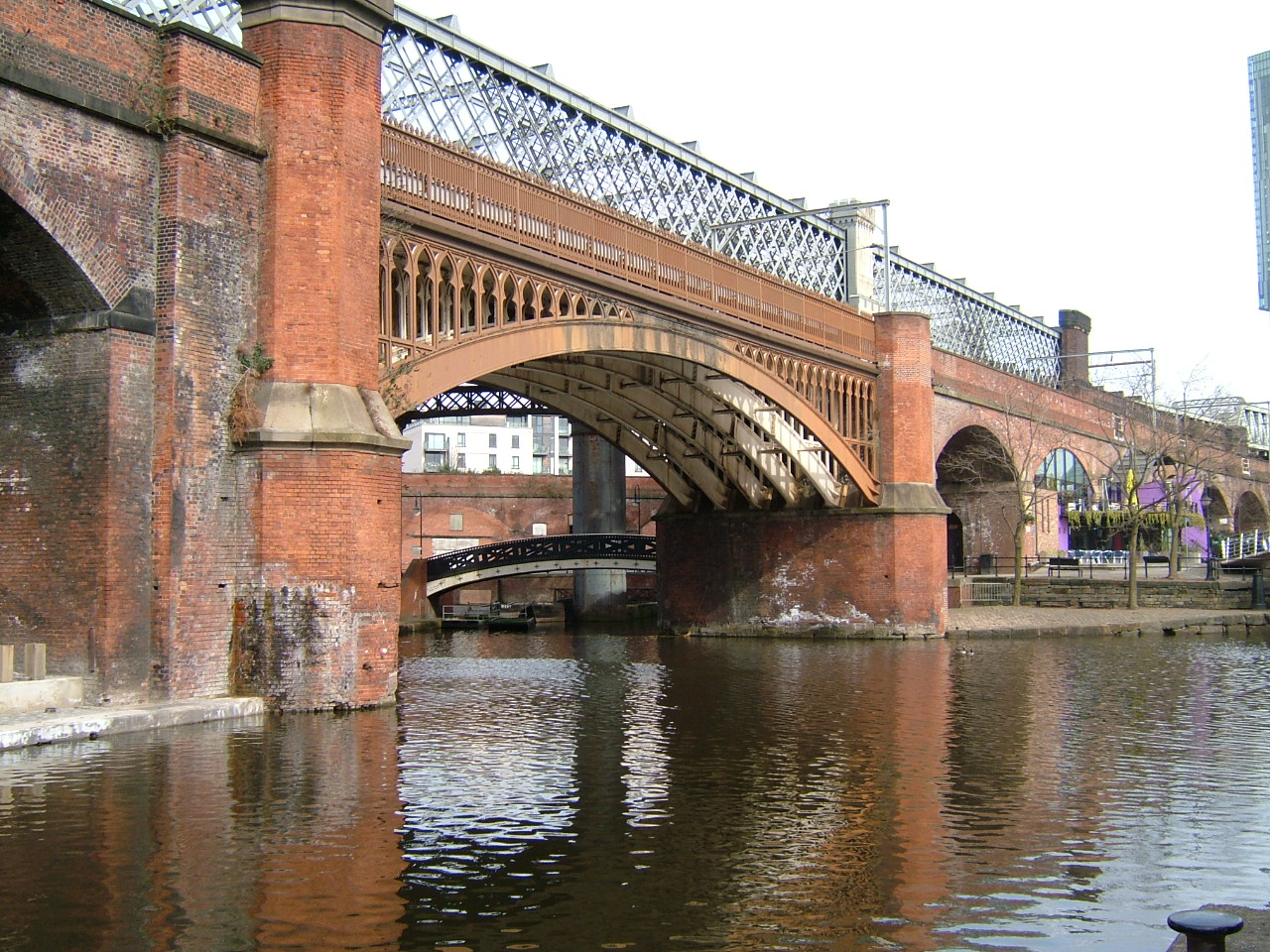
The cast iron arch of the 1849 viaduct with the Cornbrook viaduct over and behind

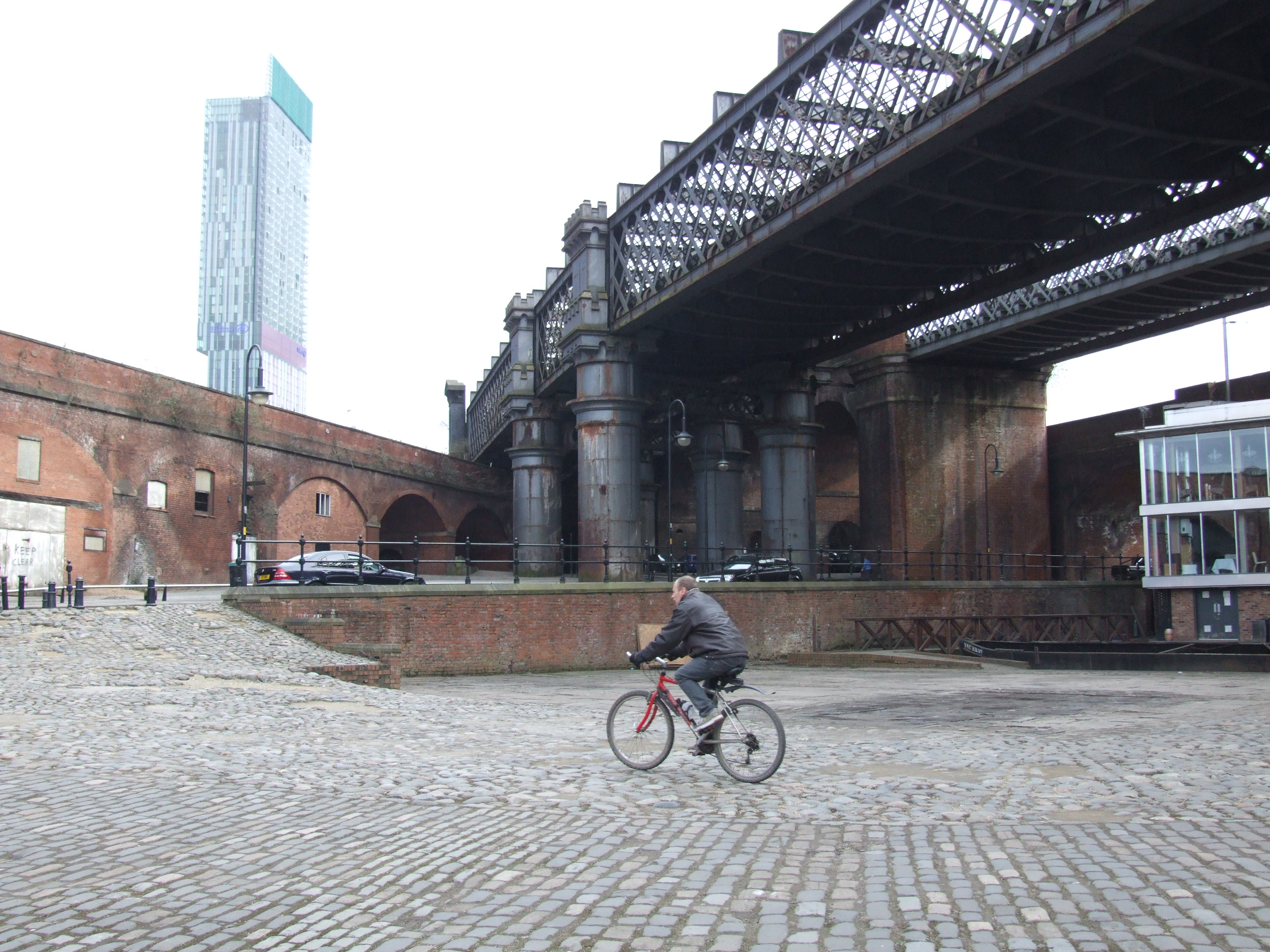
Beneath the Cornbook and Great Northern viaducts with MSJ&AR viaducts on the left and extreme right

The canal basin at Castlefield is crossed by four large railway viaducts dating from 1848, 1877 and 1898.

The southern viaduct in the group of three is the 1849 red brick viaduct of the Manchester, South Junction and Altrincham Railway with its cast iron arch bridge over the Rochdale Canal. It carried the double tracks between Manchester Piccadilly via Oxford Road station and Knott Mill railway station, then turns south-west, crosses the canal basin and heads for Altrincham. Designated as No.100A, it forms part of the long brick viaduct taking the Altrincham branch of the Manchester South Junction & Altrincham Railway through Knott Mill Station. The bridge, designed by William Baker, spans 31.9m. It has six cast iron ribs each made in five pieces and bolted together. The ribs are braced with cruciform cast iron sections. The twin railway tracks were carried on cast iron deck plates. The resident engineer was Henry Hemberow, and the sections were cast by Garforths of Dukinfield. The MSJ&A Railway was Manchester's first suburban railway line. A second cast iron rib arch bridge by Baker passed over Egerton Street but this was reconstructed in steel in 1976.

The central one in the group of three southwest of Deansgate Station is the high-level iron truss girder viaduct of 1877 built for the Cheshire Lines Committee by the Midland Railway. It's known as Cornbrook Viaduct. The viaduct is a red brick and wrought iron truss girder construction. When it opened in 1877, it carried trains coming from a temporary station to Irlam and Warrington, and Chorlton via a branch line. The temporary station was replaced by Sir John Fowler's Manchester Central Station in 1880, which operated until 1969 and is now used as an exhibition centre (Manchester Central).

To the north is the 1894 Great Northern viaduct that served the Great Northern Railway's warehouse in Deansgate. The high-level tubular steel viaduct is decorated with turrets. It was built for the Great Northern Railway Company and carried GNR trains to the company's Deansgate warehouse until 1963. Richard Johnson who was a Chief Engineer of the GNR was responsible for the design.

The Cornbrook and Great Northern viaducts stood disused for years. When a route for the Metrolink trams was investigated, the Cornbrook Viaduct was found to be in much better condition than the 1894 one. It was chosen for refurbishment (1990–1991) and is currently used by Metrolink trams going to the Airport, Altrincham, Didsbury and Eccles.

The Salford branch viaduct, the fourth viaduct, was separate from the others. It was also built by the Manchester South Junction & Altrincham Railway in 1848–1849. It uses a brick arch to cross the Staffordshire arm of the basin, before passing under the later Cornbrook and Great Northern viaduct and intersected with the then main line to Altrincham at a point about 300m west of Knott Mill Station. The whole viaduct from Piccadilly to Ordsall Junction is 1.75 miles (2.82 km) long and consists of 224 brick arches. There were six cast iron bridges that span Water Street, the Rochdale Canal, Castle Street and Chester Road, Deansgate Station, Oxford Road (encased in concrete in 1959) and over Albion Street (renewed in reinforced concrete in 1980). They were all designed by William Baker and have a similar construction, with six cast iron arches each made in three or five sections.

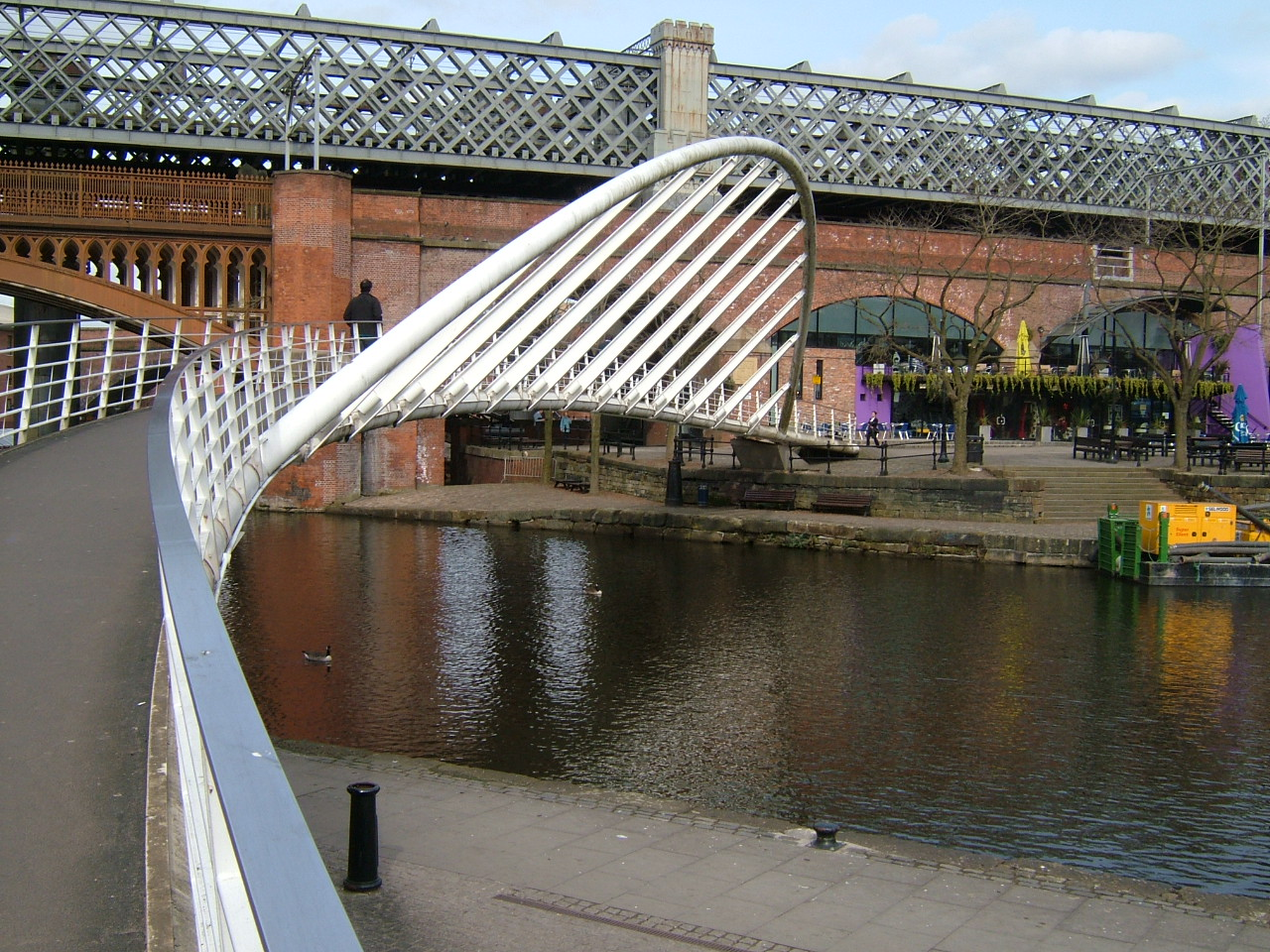
The Whitby and Bird Merchants' Bridge

During the regeneration of the Castlefield basin, a spectacular footbridge was built from Slate Wharf to Catalan Square. This is the Merchant's Bridge, where the 3m wide deck is hung by 13 hangers from the steel arches. The span is 40m. The designers, Whitby and Bird acknowledge the influence of Santiago Calatrava.

A couple of modern but traditional looking cast iron clad steel footbridges built by Marsh Bros Engineers, Bakewell 1990 have been thrown over some arms. In addition Dutch style lifting bridges have been built at Slate Wharf and Grocers Warehouse. An interesting stone-clad footbridge has been built over the Rochdale Canal. This is called the Architect's bridge.

George Stephenson's line crossed the River Irwell by a skew-arched masonry bridge built in 1830, to the north of the canal basin and then Water Street; this bridge is the first recorded use of the Hodgkinson beam, (or I-beam).

=== Other prominent buildings ===
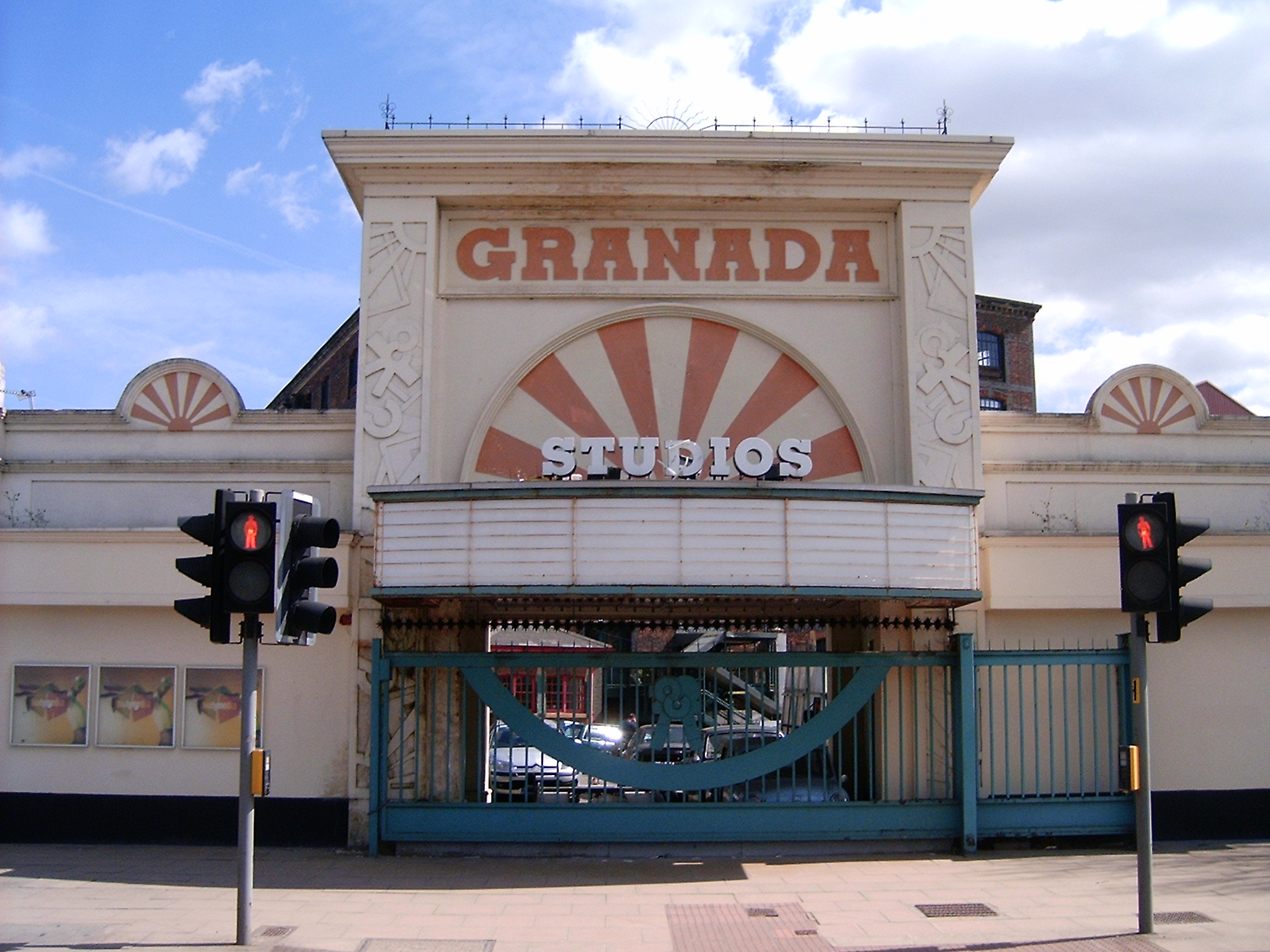
Granada Studios Tour

The Liverpool Road railway station complex is significant as it was here that the passenger terminus was invented, and concepts such as separate facilities for the rich and the poor first appear here. The station is the oldest mainline station in the world. The booking hall for first and second class passengers was on Liverpool Road, and there were separate stairs up to the separate first floor waiting rooms and the platform. There was a sundial over the first class entrance, since up to 1847, Manchester Corporation used 'local time' and that was set by the sun. In 1847, the Corporation adopted 'railway time'. Adjoining the station are the 1830 warehouse (300 ft X 70 ft) with 6 spur tracks, and the three-storey 200 ft (61 m) long, No. 1 Cotton Store built in 1831, and the similar No. 2 Cotton Store. However this was period of rapid expansion. The 1830 warehouse had been built within 4 months by David Bellhouse Jnr. In 1837, the station buildings were extended by the Grand Junction Railway and a new goods shed built. Warehouses now covered 5 acres (2.0 ha), and had a floor area of 4,000,000 sq ft (370,000 m^{2}). The passenger station closed on 4 May 1844 when the line was extended to join the Manchester and Leeds Railway at a new station situated in Hunt's Bank and it all became a freight terminal. The cotton stores and the goods sheds were demolished in the 1860s when the London and North Western Railway expanded the goods station.

In 1844 there were six railway lines connecting the world to Manchester, and Léon Faucher commented that there were 15 or 16 seats of industry that formed this great constellation.

Two more railway warehouses can be seen, the 1869 London and North Western Railway Bonded Warehouse on Grape Street with its separate viaduct over Water Street and the four-storey 1880 Great Western Railway Lower Byrom Street Warehouse. The Lower Byrom Street Warehouse is now part of the Museum of Science and Industry, while the Grape Street warehouse is used by Granada Studios as studios, rehearsal space and offices.

== Regeneration ==
Castlefield regeneration dates from 1972, when the Greater Manchester Council carried out archaeological investigations in the area. The Liverpool Road goods depot closed 8 September 1975, and the GMC made a survey of the site and it became the North Western Museum of Science and Industry in 1978.

Through the joint efforts of the Civic Trust, the Georgian Group, the Victorian Society and Manchester Region Industrial Archaeology Society (MRIAS) a report called Historic Castlefield was published in 1979, which set upon a development framework. Also in 1979 Castlefield was designated a conservation area even though most of its historic canals and buildings were derelict. The major landowner was the Manchester Ship Canal Company. The area's potential had been recognised and the 1982 City Centre Local Plan actively supported the Museum of Science and Industry at Liverpool Road, and the Castlefield Conservation Area Steering Committee, (CCASC) was formed.

Castlefield designated itself Britain's first Urban Heritage Park in 1983. This led to £40m of public sector funding being invested for regeneration.

In 1988 the Central Manchester Development Corporation was created to formulate a regeneration policy for nearly 187 ha of central Manchester (approximately 40% of the city centre) and to pump-prime private sector development using Government grants. This embraced Castlefield.

The Corporation determined that Castlefield should be revitalised by strengthening the tourism base, consolidating and supporting business activity and establishing a vibrant residential community. The imaginative and sensitive conservation and enhancement of the listed buildings, canals, viaducts and spaces, was to be achieved with high standards of urban design. A large number of grants now became available for public/private development partnerships.

One organisation to benefit was Jim Ramsbottom's, Castlefield Estates company, who initiated several significant development projects, including Eastgate, Merchants Warehouse and Dukes 92.

The similarly named Castlefield Management Company was created in 1992 as a non-profit company to provide services, events and to maintain the environmental quality of the area. An Urban Ranger service was set up to assist visitors, guide tours and oversee the Urban Heritage Park.

Most of the buildings have now either been renovated or restored and a number of them have been converted into modern apartments (warehouse flats). A number of archaeological digs have taken place and revealed a great deal about the early history of the city. Manchester City Council have recently encouraged high quality new developments to accompany the converted warehouses and enhance the conservation area. However, key sites remain to be completed, and Ian Simpson's proposals for a massive eight-storey block of apartments at Jackson's Wharf, has twice been rejected by the City Council reflecting vociferous local objections. For instance, the entertainer Mike Harding said:

I oppose the Jackson's Wharf development most vehemently. The original concept of Castlefield as an urban heritage park and the early work of Jim Ramsbottom in particular was truly exciting. Then the big money moved in and the dream was hijacked. Brutal Euroboxes, with neither imagination nor taste to ameliorate them, were thrown up piecemeal in one of the worst cases of planning blight I can think of, so that now Manchester looks like a city designed by a schizophrenic drunk with attention deficiency disorder.

== See also ==
- List of lattice girder bridges in the United Kingdom
- Castlefield Forum
