= Castlefields =

Castlefields may mean these places in England:

- Castlefield, an area in Manchester
- A suburb of Shrewsbury
- An area in Stafford
