= Hulme Locks Branch Canal =

Canal in Manchester, England

Coordinates: 53°28′N 2°16′W

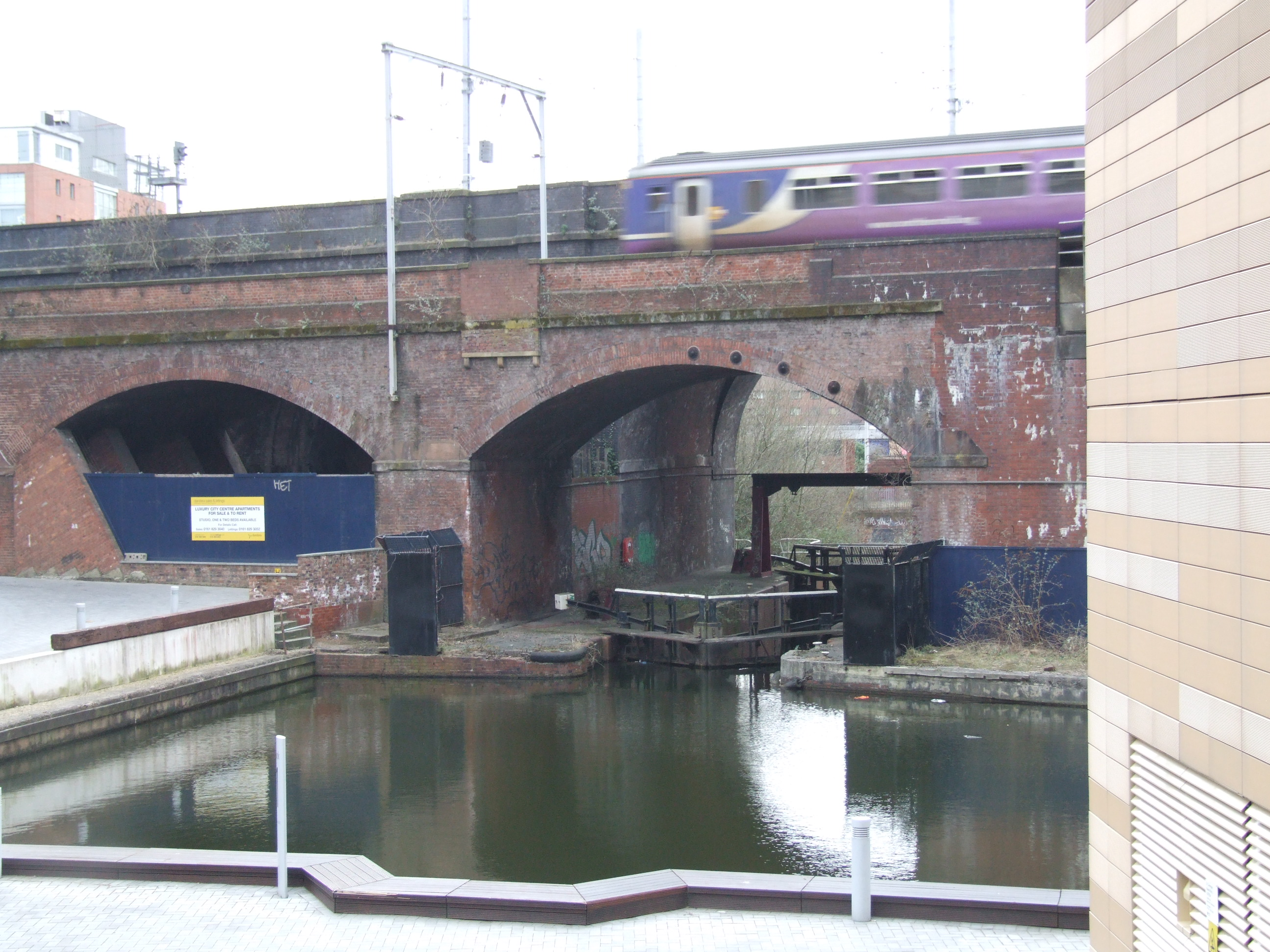
- The Hulme Locks at the Bridgewater Canal end
- Interactive map of Hulme Locks Branch Canal

Specifications
- Locks: 2
- Status: Closed

History
- Date of first use: 1839
- Date closed: 1995

Geography
- Connects to: Mersey and Irwell Navigation

The Hulme Locks Branch Canal is a canal in the city of Manchester. It is 200 metres (0.12 mi) long and was built to provide a direct waterway between the Mersey and Irwell Navigation and the Bridgewater Canal. The canal opened in 1838 and was superseded in 1995 by a new lock at Pomona Dock 3. As both of its locks remain closed, the canal is now overgrown.

== History ==
The lack of any direct canal link between the Mersey and Irwell Navigation (M&IN) and the Rochdale Canal meant that goods being transported using both waterways had to be offloaded onto carts and carried across the city, before being loaded back onto boats to continue their journey. This was costly and time-consuming, as well as adding to traffic congestion on the streets of Manchester.

In 1799 the nearby Manchester Bolton & Bury Canal company (MB&B) proposed to connect their canal (Note: At this time the MB&BC was still under construction, and did not connect to the River Irwell until 1805. It terminated at Oldfield Road in Salford) to the Rochdale canal with an aqueduct across the M&IN. Due mainly to strong objections from the M&IN, who would have suffered a loss of trade, the link was not forthcoming. In 1805, John Nightingale was asked by the Mersey and Irwell Navigation Company to estimate the cost of a canal link between Manchester and Salford. Nothing would happen until 1836, when John Gilbert was appointed as engineer.

The Bridgewater Canal Company sensing potential loss of trade cut the short Hulme Locks Branch Canal connecting their canal to the River Irwell. The following year the M&IN completed the Manchester and Salford Junction Canal. This provided an alternative route from the Rochdale Canal to the River Irwell, and cargoes from either direction could navigate onto the Irwell using the junction canal or Hulme Locks.

== Decline ==
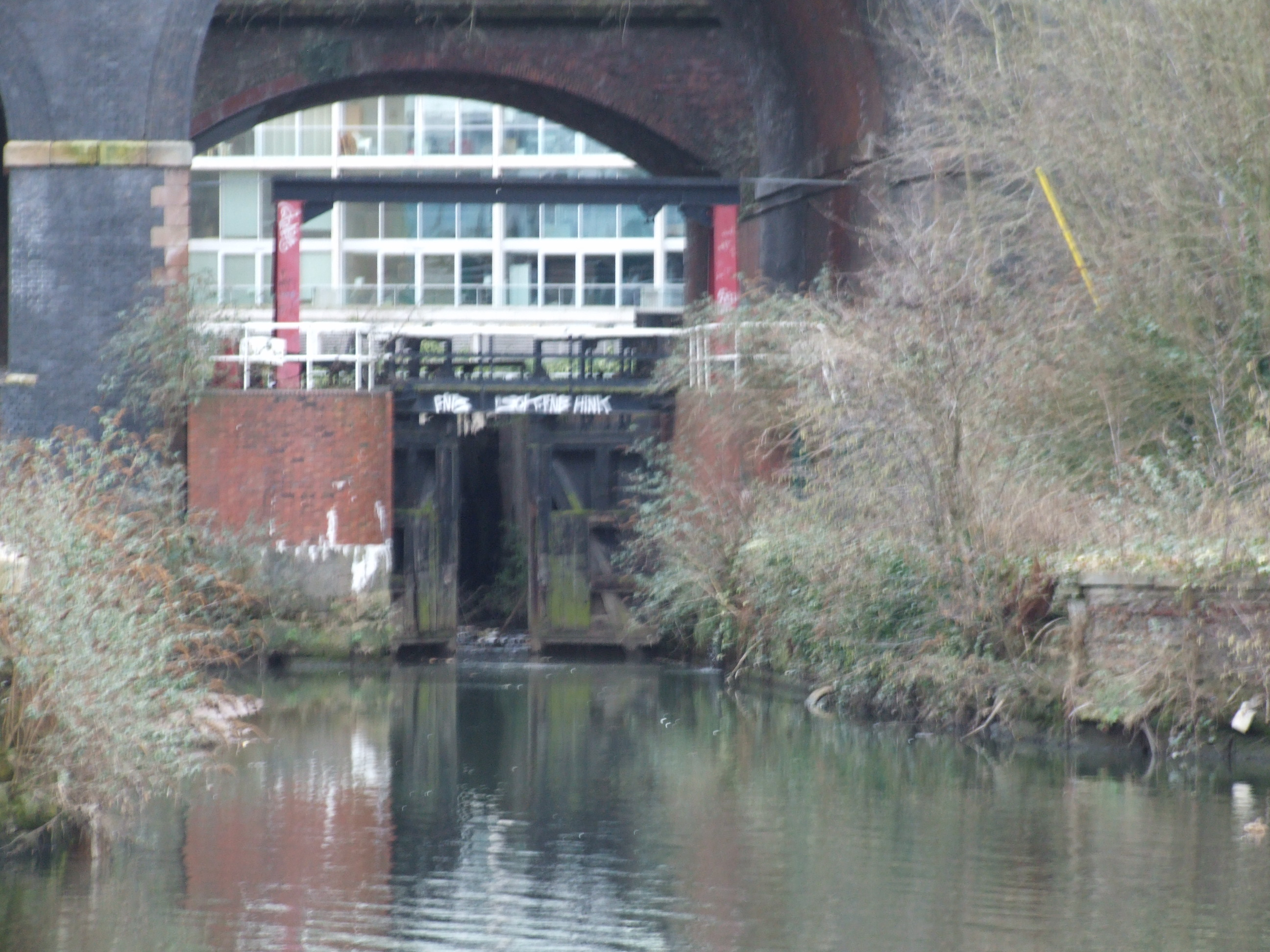
The Hulme Locks at the River Medlock and Irwell end

The canals were constructed just as railways were becoming popular but the railways had little effect on Bridgewater Canal traffic. In later years, both the Bridgewater Canal and River Irwell came to be owned by the Manchester Ship Canal Company, removing the competitive incentive for keeping both canals open and the Junction Canal was abandoned in 1922. Hulme Locks Branch Canal was used until 1995, when a new lock was provided at Pomona Docks (Dock 3), and this branch canal is now overgrown. There were originally three locks on the Hulme Locks Branch but because of the large amount of barge traffic carrying maize from ships in Salford Docks to Kelloggs factory in Trafford Park, improvements were made to the Bridgewater Canal in the 1950s and 60s which included changing the three locks to one single deep lock. This happened in 1962. The canal was also deepened between here and the Kelloggs factory so that the barges could carry greater payloads. A new fleet of steel barges was built in the late 1940s and early '50s, principally to carry the Kelloggs traffic. This traffic ceased in 1974, because Kelloggs were finding it increasingly difficult to find suitable ships to bring the maize from Canada that were small enough to use the Ship Canal so they built a new mill at Liverpool.

== See also ==
- Listed buildings in Manchester-M15
