= Emma (1828 ship) =

Barge which capsized during its launch in 1828

History
- Name: Emma
- Operator: New Quay Company
- Route: Mersey and Irwell Navigation and later, River Weaver
- Launched: 29 February 1828

General characteristics
- Type: River flat

The Emma was a river flat launched on 29 February 1828 along the Mersey and Irwell Navigation, in Manchester. Built by the New Quay Company, it was one of the largest cargo vessels to be built alongside the Irwell. The vessel capsized shortly after its launch, causing the deaths of as many as 47 of its estimated 200 passengers. Many others were rescued by bystanders, and treated by surgeons along the river banks. The Emma was eventually righted, and spent the rest of its life working along the River Weaver.

== History ==
The New Quay Company, established in 1822, used boats to transport goods and passengers between Manchester and Liverpool. The Emma was a new vessel and was to be launched with an opening ceremony at the company's premises on the east bank of the Irwell. On the day of the launch, 29 February 1828, a large crowd gathered to watch the ceremony, entertained by a band of the ninth regiment accompanied by the sound of cannons. Flags and streamers were placed both on nearby vessels, and along the quay.

A bottle of wine was broken over the ship's bow by two daughters of the company's manager, William Brereton Grime. Including his daughters, 200 passengers boarded the vessel before it was released from its stocks. Following its launch the fully rigged vessel listed slightly to one side before continuing across the river and hitting the opposite bank. The Emma then capsized, throwing many of its passengers into the river.

As the boat hit the bank, a boy, James Haslam, was forced by the weight of the crowd behind him into the river. Huitson Dearman, a dyer from Salford, rescued three people from the river, but died while attempting to rescue a fourth. A fishmonger who had also entered the river to rescue survivors after several hours returned to find his clothes had been stolen. He subsequently suffered from the exposure to the cold, and died several months later. A number of smaller boats were launched to rescue the passengers, some of whom remained in the water to rescue the others. One of the boats was so overwhelmed by survivors that it almost sank. Some of the passengers were dragged under the surface by other passengers. Those passengers removed from the Manchester bank of the river were taken to a warehouse belonging to the New Quay Company, and those taken onto the Salford bank were taken to the Britannia Inn and the Kings Arms. Two more, who later survived, were also taken to the Lying-in Hospital at Salford's New Bailey Prison. William Grime's two daughters were among the survivors.

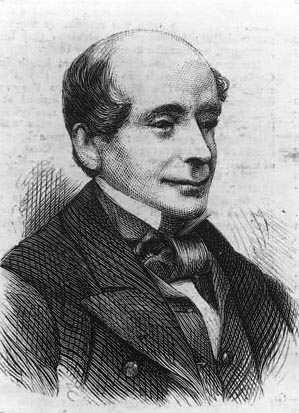
Sir James Phillips Kay-Shuttleworth was one of the doctors who helped resuscitate passengers pulled from the river

Several surgeons were called to the scene of the accident, including Kinder Wood, Joseph Jordan, and the politician and educationalist James Phillips Kay. His attempts to resuscitate some of the passengers included the use of a hot-bath, and then the use of a pair of bellows into an incision he had made into the wind-pipe; in two instances this proved successful. He also gave transfusions to some passengers, using blood from men and, as a last resort, a dog.

Initially, 34 bodies were pulled from the river. The body of a young girl, trapped underneath the vessel, was recovered when at about 5 pm it was righted. As news of the accident spread throughout the town, relatives and friends of the passengers arrived and frantically began asking of their whereabouts. One man, on discovering his dead wife at the New Quay warehouse, was reported to have tried repeatedly to revive her.

== Aftermath ==
Inquests were held at the New Quay and two public houses on Oldfield Lane in Salford, each returning verdicts of "Accidentally Drowned". The victims were buried in a variety of locations, including Christ Church in Hulme, and the former St John's Church on Byrom Street. Accounts vary but as many as 47 bodies may have been retrieved from the water. Some sources state that a cause of the many deaths may well have been the river pollution from a nearby gasworks.

The New Quay Company publicly acknowledged the efforts of many of those involved in the rescue of its passengers, and the work of the surgeons on the day. The incident features in the novel by Mrs G Linnæus Banks, 'The Manchester Man'. As well as Huitson Dearman, Richard Fogg (a clerk at the company) was congratulated for aiding about 30 passengers. A fund was established for the bereaved families and the reward of the rescuers. The Emma was recovered and reportedly spent its working life transporting salt on the River Weaver.

Through marriage, one of William Grime's daughters later became Elizabeth Salisbury Heywood, and presented Manchester with a statue of Oliver Cromwell.

== See also ==
- Mark Philips – chairman of the New Quay Company
