= Manchester and Salford Junction Canal =

Disused Canal in Manchester, UK (1839–1922)

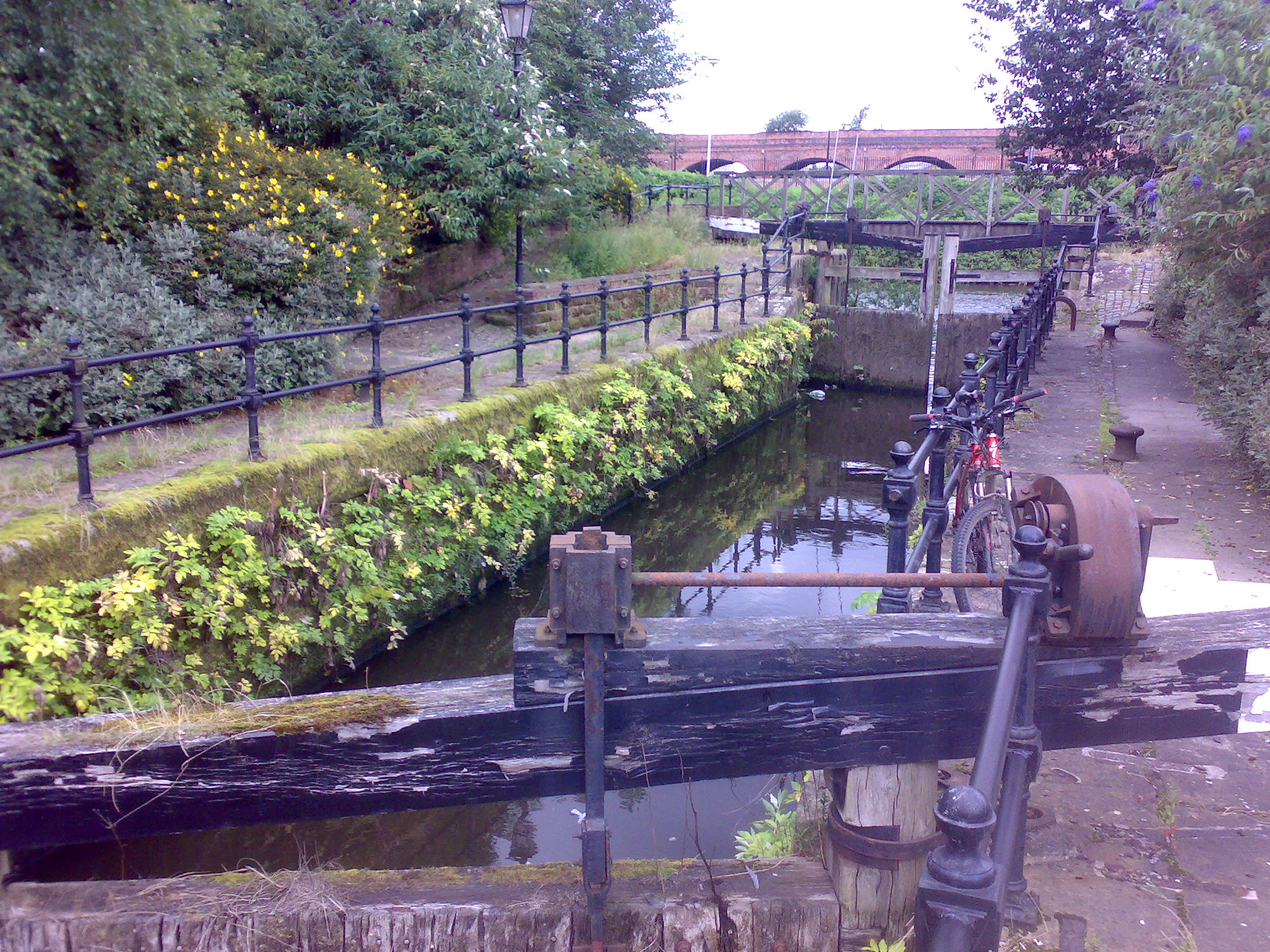
- The canal stub viewed north towards the junction with the River Irwell
- Interactive map of Manchester and Salford Junction Canal

Specifications
- Locks: 7 + stop lock (originally 7 + stop lock) (lock 2. 1 chamber converted to dry dock)
- Status: Closed

History
- Original owner: Mersey and Irwell Navigation Company
- Principal engineer: John Gilbert
- Date of first use: 1839
- Date closed: 1922

Geography
- Connects to: Rochdale Canal

The Manchester and Salford Junction Canal was a canal in the city of Manchester. It was originally built to provide a direct waterway between the Mersey and Irwell Navigation and the Rochdale Canal. The canal opened in 1839 and was abandoned in 1922.

== History ==
The lack of any direct canal link between the Mersey and Irwell Navigation and the Rochdale Canal meant that goods being transported using both waterways had to be offloaded onto carts and carried across the city, before being loaded back onto boats to continue their journey. This was costly and time-consuming, as well as adding to traffic congestion on the streets of Manchester.

In 1799, the nearby Manchester, Bolton and Bury Canal company proposed to connect their canal to the Rochdale canal with an aqueduct across the Mersey and Irwell Navigation. Due mainly to strong objections from the Mersey and Irwell Navigation, who would have suffered a loss of trade, the link was not forthcoming. In 1805, John Nightingale was asked by the Mersey and Irwell Navigation Company to estimate the cost of a canal link between Manchester and Salford.

Nothing would happen until 1836, when John Gilbert was appointed as engineer. In 1838, just as the canal was being built, the Bridgewater Canal Company were completing their Hulme Locks Branch Canal. This provided an alternative route from the Rochdale Canal to the River Irwell, and cargoes from either direction could navigate onto the Irwell without the need to use the new Junction Canal.

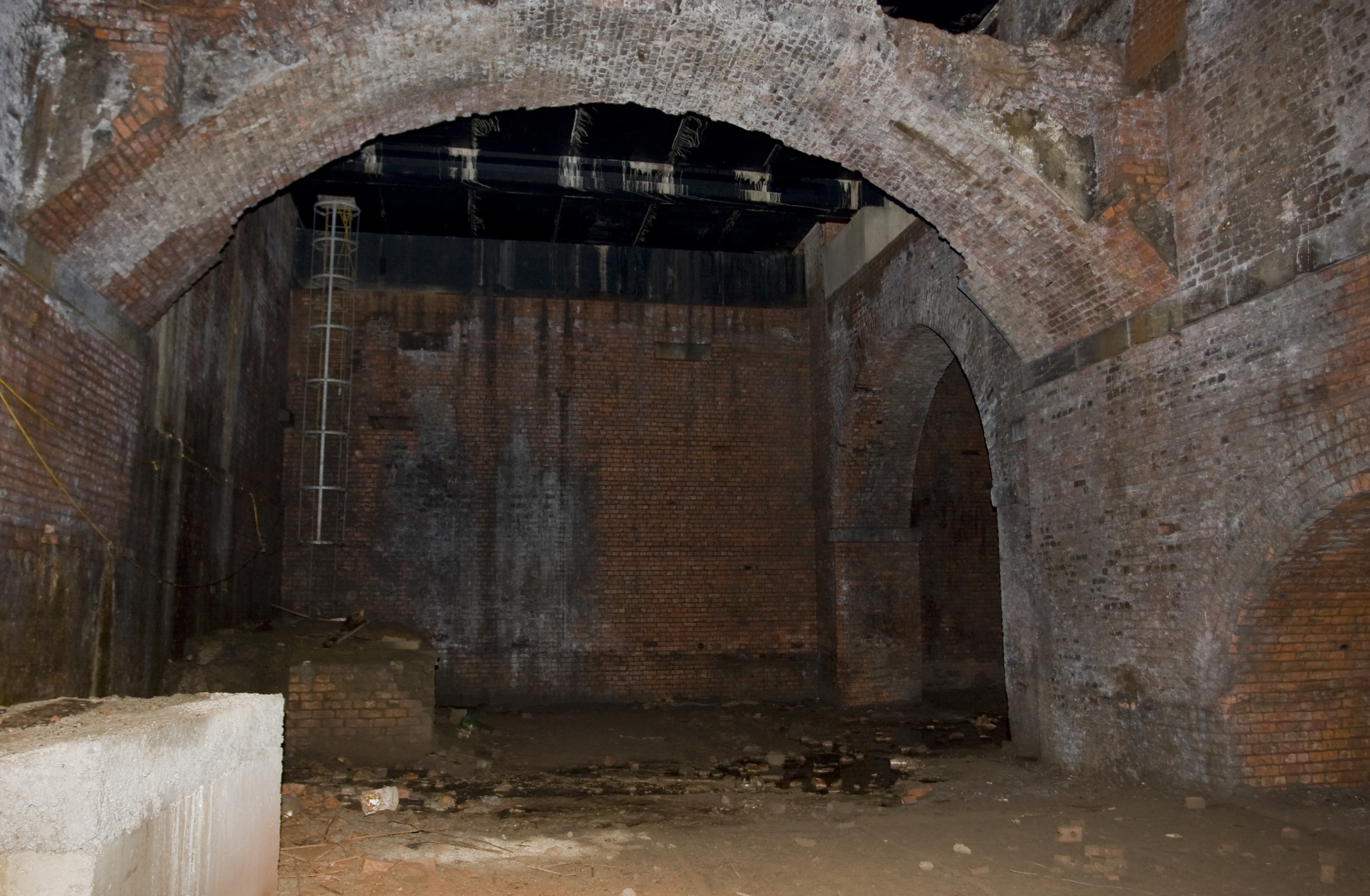
An underground section of the canal

Construction of the new canal was funded in part by the proprietors of the Manchester, Bolton and Bury Canal. The canal was opened in 1839. In 1885, the Great Northern Warehouse was built on top of the line of the canal and a dock was constructed to allow the interchange of goods. There were four large bays below the warehouse with two lift shafts to allow goods to be unloaded from the boats using the canal, and raised up to the warehouse for storage.

== Decline ==
The canal was constructed just as railways were becoming popular. In later years, both the Bridgewater and Rochdale canals came to be owned by the Manchester Ship Canal Company, removing the competitive incentive for keeping both canals open and the Junction Canal was abandoned in 1922. During the Second World War, sections of the canal were drained and converted for use as air-raid shelters.

== Route ==
The canal ran for 5 furlongs (1 km) between the River Irwell from southwest of Quay Street, to a branch of the Rochdale Canal southeast of Lower Mosley Street, mostly through a 499-yard (456 m) tunnel. The canal is now dry, and disused, although large parts remain underneath the city, particularly sections underneath the Great Northern Warehouse and Granada Studios. The original western entrance is still visible from the River Irwell; the eastern entrance has been redeveloped into a small canal basin behind the Bridgewater Hall.

The canal used four locks and lifted water from the River Irwell with two pumping stations. locks 2 were paired Locks. Locks 3 & 4 were paired staircase locks

Location	Coordinates
Lock 1	53.4789°N 2.25725°W
Lock 2	53.478734°N 2.256632°W
Slate Wharf	53.478416°N 2.256148°W
Transhipment Dock	53.476848°N 2.249349°W
Lock 3	53.476445°N 2.248293°W
Lock 4	53.476396°N 2.247946°W
Stop Lock	53.475716°N 2.245764°W
Bridgewater Hall Basin	53.475582°N 2.245167°W

== See also ==
- Canals of the United Kingdom
- History of the British canal system
