= Castlefield Bowl =

Outdoor arena in Manchester, England

- View of seating at the venue (c. 2010)
- Interactive map of Castlefield Bowl
- Former names: Castlefield Events Arena (1993–96); Castlefield Arena (1996–2016)
- Address: 101 Liverpool Road; Manchester M3 4JN; England
- Location: Castlefield
- Coordinates: 53.4760076°N 2.2563213°W
- Owner: City of Manchester
- Capacity: 8,450
- Event: Amphitheatre

Construction
- Opened: 1993
- Architect: DEGW

The Castlefield Bowl (originally the Castlefield Events Arena and formerly the Castlefield Arena) is an outdoor events pavilion in the inner city conservation area of Castlefield in Manchester, England. Reinvigorated in 1993, the lead architect was DEGW Architects. The tensile roof structure was designed by Rudi Enos, and is a semi-cantilever framework incorporating lighting and sound. The arena is often used for food festivals and music events.

The Stone Roses' frontman Ian Brown headlined New Year's Eve 1999, which was the first show at the pavilion.

The arena has played host to New Order, The Last Shadow Puppets, Bloc Party, The Strypes, Catfish and the Bottlemen, Noel Gallagher and The Courteeners.

In 2010, the arena was used as a Hyundai Fan Park showing all football matches from the 2010 FIFA World Cup.

== Sounds of the City ==
In 2017, it played host to the city's 'Sounds of the City' series of shows. Artists to perform included Arcade Fire, Blossoms, James, The Verve and Blink-182.

Shed Seven, Haçienda Classical, Rag'n'Bone Man, Paul Heaton & Jacqui Abbott, and The Levellers played in 2018.

The National, Kylie Minogue and Bloc Party performed there in July 2019.

The 2020 event was cancelled due to the COVID-19 pandemic.

Sounds of the City 2021 featured The Streets, Kaiser Chiefs, Razorlight, DMA's and Paul Heaton & Jacqui Abbott.

Lewis Capaldi, Foals, Crowded House, The Libertines, James, Pixies, Sam Fender, and Haçienda Classical performed in June and July 2022.

Sounds of the City 2023 saw performances by Porcupine Tree, The Lathums, The Saw Doctors, Pulp, Hozier, Blossoms, Bastille, Two Door Cinema Club, and Haçienda Classical.
