= Urban heritage park =

An urban heritage park is an unofficial designation for an inner-city area considered worthy of preservation because of its architectural or historic interest.

The term was first used to describe Castlefield in Manchester in 1982, inspired by examples of similar areas in Lowell, Massachusetts observed in 1975. After conservation area status was obtained for the area in Castlefield, a conservation committee representing the area's stakeholders was formed three years later, with three objectives:

- To preserve and interpret the area's history
- To influence future planning applications
- To attract allocations of funds for improvements specially related to recreation and tourism

The group declared the area an "urban heritage park" later that year, and the term was heavily marketed. 25 years later, the term has become accepted and appears in titles of academic courses.
