= Mersey and Irwell Navigation =

Canal in North West England

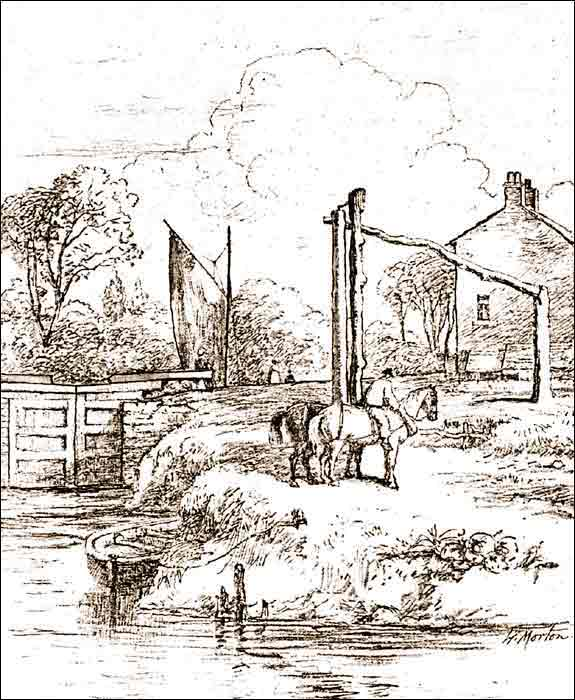
- Stickings Lock on the River Irwell, c. 1850
- Interactive map of Mersey and Irwell Navigation

Specifications
- Status: mostly destroyed

History
- Date of act: 1721
- Date completed: 1734
- Date closed: 1880s

Geography
- Start point: Salford
- End point: Widnes

The Mersey and Irwell Navigation was a river navigation in North West England, which provided a navigable route from the Mersey estuary to Salford and Manchester, by improving the course of the River Irwell and the River Mersey. Eight locks were constructed between 1724 and 1734, and the rivers were improved by the construction of new cuts several times subsequently. Use of the navigation declined from the 1870s, and it was ultimately superseded by the Manchester Ship Canal, the construction of which destroyed most of the Irwell section of the navigation and the long cut between Latchford and Runcorn.

== History ==
Rivers Mercy and Irwell Navigation Act 1720
- Act of Parliament
- Parliament of Great Britain
- Long title: An Act for making the Rivers Mercy and Irwell navigable, from Liverpoole to Manchester, in the County Palatine of Lancaster.
- Citation: 7 Geo. 1. St. 1 c. 15
- Territorial extent: Great Britain

Dates
- Royal assent: 7 June 1721
- Commencement: 8 December 1720 (Note: Start of session.)
Other legislation
Amended by	Mersey and Irwell Navigation Act 1794
Relates to	River Dane Navigation Act 1720

Status: Amended

Text of statute as originally enacted

Mersey and Irwell Navigation Act 1794
- Act of Parliament
- Parliament of Great Britain
- Long title: An Act for altering an act, passed in the seventh year of the reign of his late majesty King George the First, intituled, "An Act for making the rivers Mercy and Irwell navigable from Liverpool to Manchester, in the county palatine of Lancaster," by incorporating the proprietors of the said navigation; and to declare their respective shares therein to be a personal estate.
- Citation: 34 Geo. 3. c. 37
- Territorial extent: Great Britain

Dates
- Royal assent: 28 March 1794
- Commencement: 28 March 1794 (Note: The Acts of Parliament (Commencement) Act 1793.)
Other legislation
Amends	Rivers Mercy and Irwell Navigation Act 1720

Status: Current legislation

Text of statute as originally enacted

The idea that the Rivers Mersey and Irwell should be made navigable from the Mersey Estuary in the west to Manchester in the east was first proposed in 1660, and revived in 1712 by Thomas Steers. In 1720 the necessary bills were tabled. The act of Parliament for navigation, the Rivers Mercy and Irwell Navigation Act 1720 (7 Geo. 1. St. 1 c. 15), was received in 1721. The construction work was undertaken by the Mersey & Irwell Navigation Company. Work began in 1724, and by 1734 boats "of moderate size" could make the journey from quays in Water Street, Manchester, 53°28′46″N 2°15′23″W to the Irish Sea. The navigation was suitable only for small ships, and during periods of drought, or when strong easterly winds held back the tide in the estuary, there was not always sufficient draft for a fully laden boat.

Eight weirs were constructed along the length of the route, and some shortcuts were made around shallower parts of the river, with locks, to enable the passage of boats. Some difficult turns along the river were also removed.

The navigation was modified and improved on several occasions. A canal section known as the Runcorn and Latchford Canal was added in 1804, to bypass part of the lower reaches. In 1740 the company built quays and warehouses along Water Street in Manchester.

In 1779, a group of businessmen from Manchester and Liverpool purchased the navigation and began making improvements. A difficult section below the Howley lock was cut out by the building of the Runcorn to Latchford Canal, and at Runcorn a basin was built for boats to wait for the tide.

An aqueduct was built from Woolston Cut, to replace water lost from the locks that were used to raise boats into the new canal section.

The completion of the Bridgewater Canal in 1776, followed in 1830 by the opening of the Liverpool & Manchester Railway, meant increasing competition for the carriage of goods, and in 1844 the navigation was purchased on behalf of the Bridgewater Canal Company, for £550,800. In 1846 ownership was transferred to the canal company. (Note: The Bridgewater Canal and the Manchester Ship Canal are thus now owned by the same company.)

The company in charge of the navigation was known by several names. These include "The Old Navigation", "Old Quay Company", and "Old Quay Canal".

== Decline ==
In 1872, the navigation was sold to the newly formed Bridgewater Navigation Company for £1,112,000, but it had by then fallen into disrepair. In 1882 it was described as being "hopelessly choked with silt and filth", and was open to 50-ton boats for only 47 out of 311 working days.

Economic conditions deteriorated during the mid-1870s, in what has been called the Long Depression. The dues charged by the Port of Liverpool, and the railway charges from there to Manchester, were perceived to be excessive; it was often cheaper to import goods via Hull, on the other side of England, than it was to use Liverpool, about 35 miles (56 km) away. A ship canal was proposed as a way to reverse Manchester's economic decline by giving the city direct access to the sea for its imports and exports of manufactured goods.

== Closure ==
The construction of the Manchester Ship Canal obliterated large parts of the earlier navigation, including almost the whole of the Irwell part of the course (except for a short length upstream of Pomona Docks, which is the only surviving part of the navigation today).

A short way downstream of the confluence with the Mersey, the ship canal followed a more southerly course than the old navigation, which remained in use as late as 1950 from Rixton Junction downstream.

The lower reaches of the ship canal from Eastham to Latchford obliterated a large section of the Runcorn to Latchford Canal, leaving just a short stub joining the navigation to the canal near Stockton Heath. The Woolston New Cut, excavated in 1821, is still visible although completely dry. Woolston Old Cut, built in 1755, still exists although the lock is gone.

== Design and construction ==
=== Locks ===
There were originally eight locks along the navigation. Each lock chamber was 13 feet wide by 65 feet long.

Throstles Nest Lock was the highest on the navigation. It was followed by Mode Wheel lock. Lock 3 was at Barton-upon-Irwell, next to James Brindley's original Barton Aqueduct. The remains of the lock island appear to be situated in the same location as the island presently used for the swing aqueduct. Stickins Lock followed, in a 600-yard (550 m) cut. There were further locks named Holmes Bridge, Calamanco, Holmes Bridge and finally Howley Tidal.

Further locks were added throughout the route's history. These include a new Stickins Lock, Sandywarps Lock in a cut located close to the confluence of the Irwell and Mersey, Butchersfield Locks (located on a short cut known as the Butchersfield Canal), Woolston New (located at the upper end of Woolston New Cut), Paddington Lock (lower end of Woolston New Cut), Woolston Old Lock, Latchford, and Old Quay Sea Locks.

== See also ==
- Canals of the United Kingdom
- History of the British canal system
- Emma (1828 ship)

== Bibliography ==
- Albert, William (2007). The Turnpike Road System in England. Cambridge University Press. ISBN 978-0-521-03391-6.
- Gray, Edward (1997). Manchester Ship Canal. Sutton Publishing. ISBN 978-0-7509-1459-8.
- Hadfield, Charles; Biddle, Gordon (1970). The Canals of North West England, Vol 2 (pp.241-496). David and Charles. ISBN 978-0-7153-4992-2.
- Harford, Ian (1994). Manchester and its Ship Canal Movement. Ryburn Publishing. ISBN 978-1-85331-075-1.
- Owen, David Elystan (1983). The Manchester Ship Canal. Manchester University Press. ISBN 978-0-7190-0864-1.
- Owen, David Elystan (1988). Canals to Manchester. Manchester University Press. ISBN 978-0-7190-2631-7.
