= Runcorn Docks =

Inland port in Cheshire, England

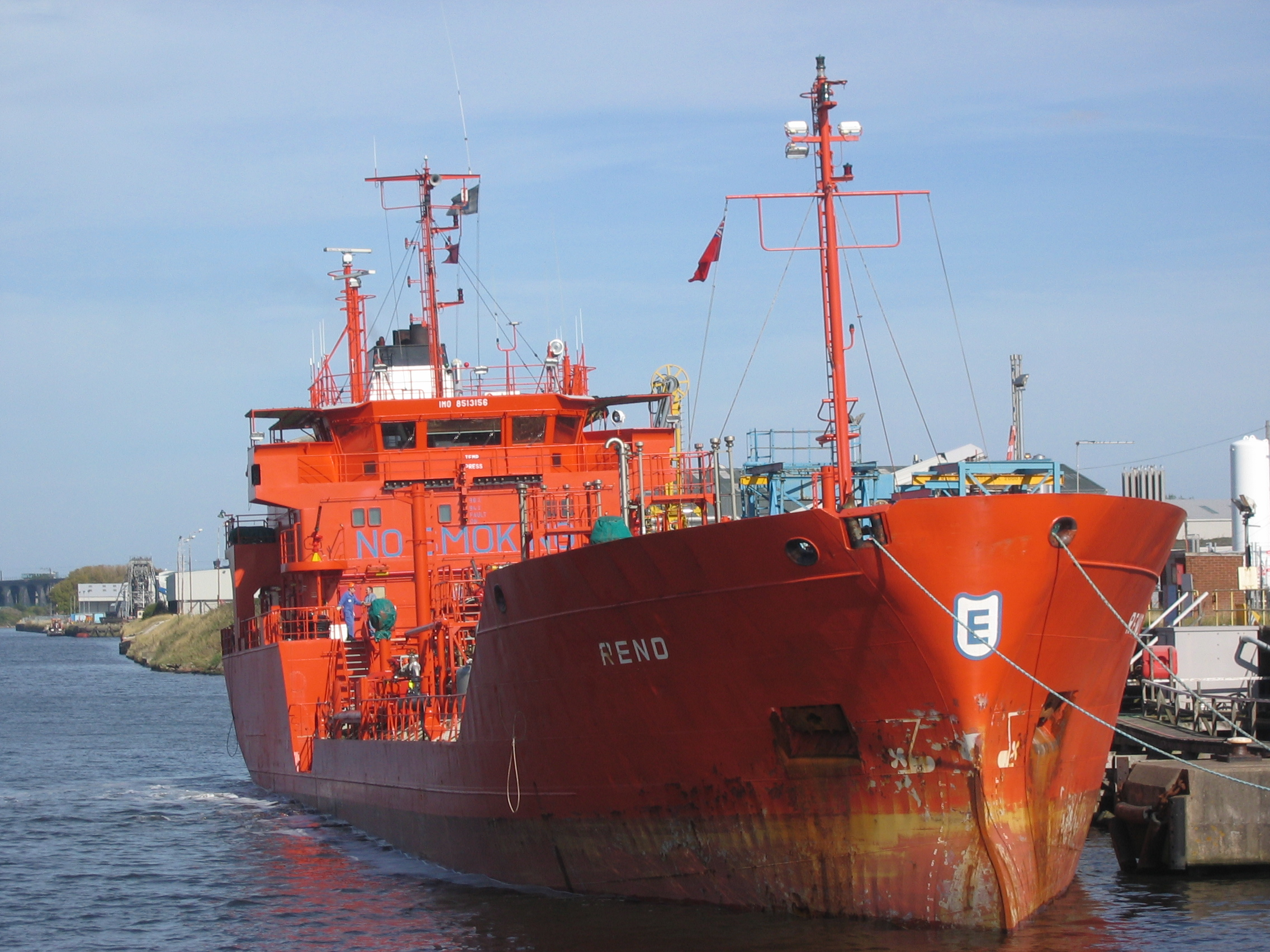
- Tanker at Runcorn Docks

Location
- Location: Runcorn, Cheshire
- Coordinates: 53.3396°N 2.7504°W
- OS grid: SJ503829

Details
- Owner: Peel Ports
- Opened: 1791
- Type: Inland port
- Purpose: Cargo transfer
- Joins: Manchester Ship Canal
- Entries: 1
- Cargo type: Bulk and project cargo

Runcorn Docks, originally the Bridgewater Docks, is an inland port on the Manchester Ship Canal in the town of Runcorn, Cheshire, England. It is operated by Peel Ports and handles bulk and project cargo.

== History ==
=== Early development ===
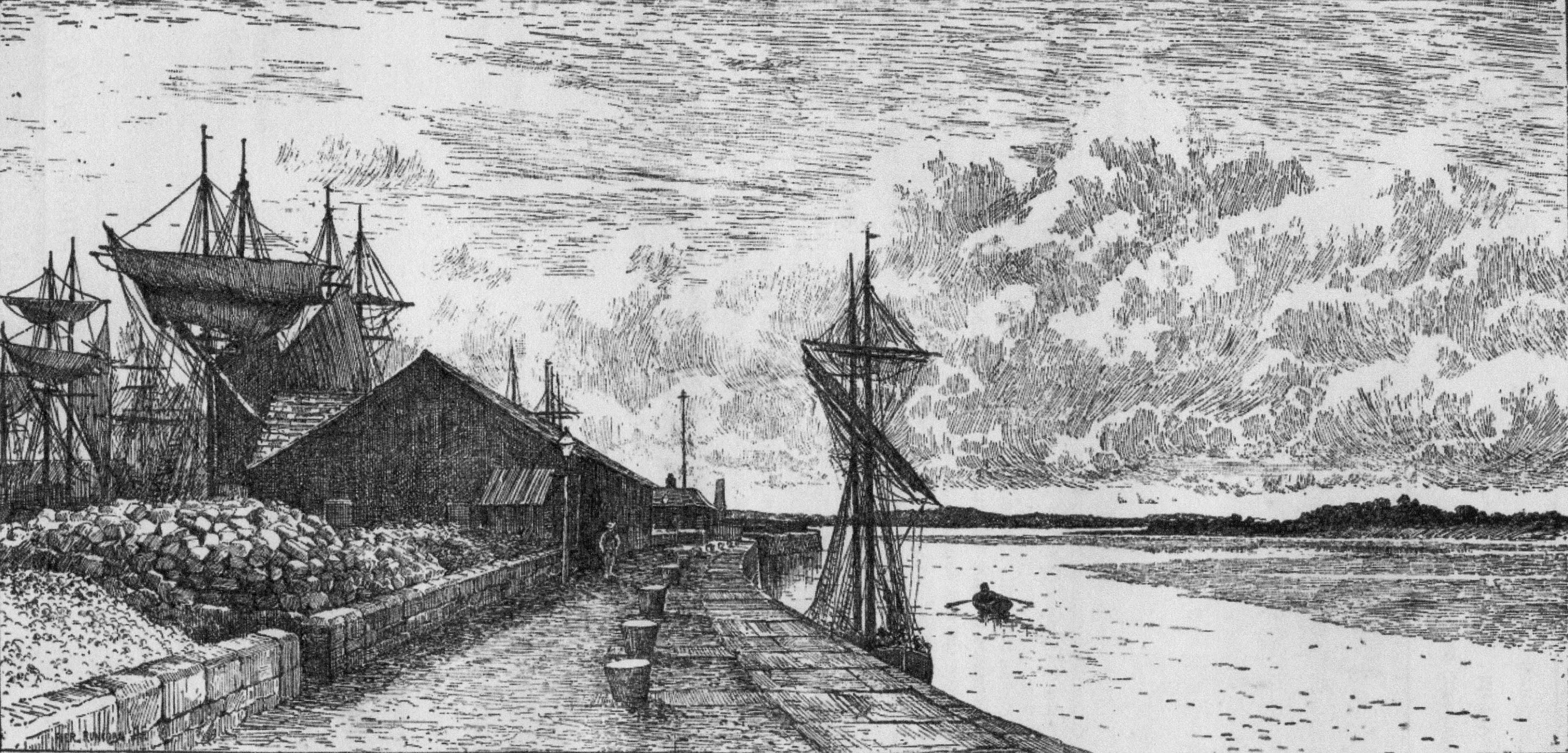
Docks on the River Mersey at Runcorn in the late 18th century

It is possible that a small Roman port existed on the River Mersey at Runcorn. But the development of a port of any significance did not start until the Bridgewater Canal was extended to Runcorn in 1776. A line of ten locks was built from 1771–1773 to connect the Runcorn basin of the canal at 21.3m AOD with the River Mersey at 3.7m AOD. Close to this point, the Duke of Bridgewater built Bridgewater House from which to supervise the work. To the west of this area he built a dock ('Old Dock'), which opened in 1791. By 1825, a second flight of locks was constructed to deal with the volume of traffic. Together, this complex was known as the Bridgewater Docks.

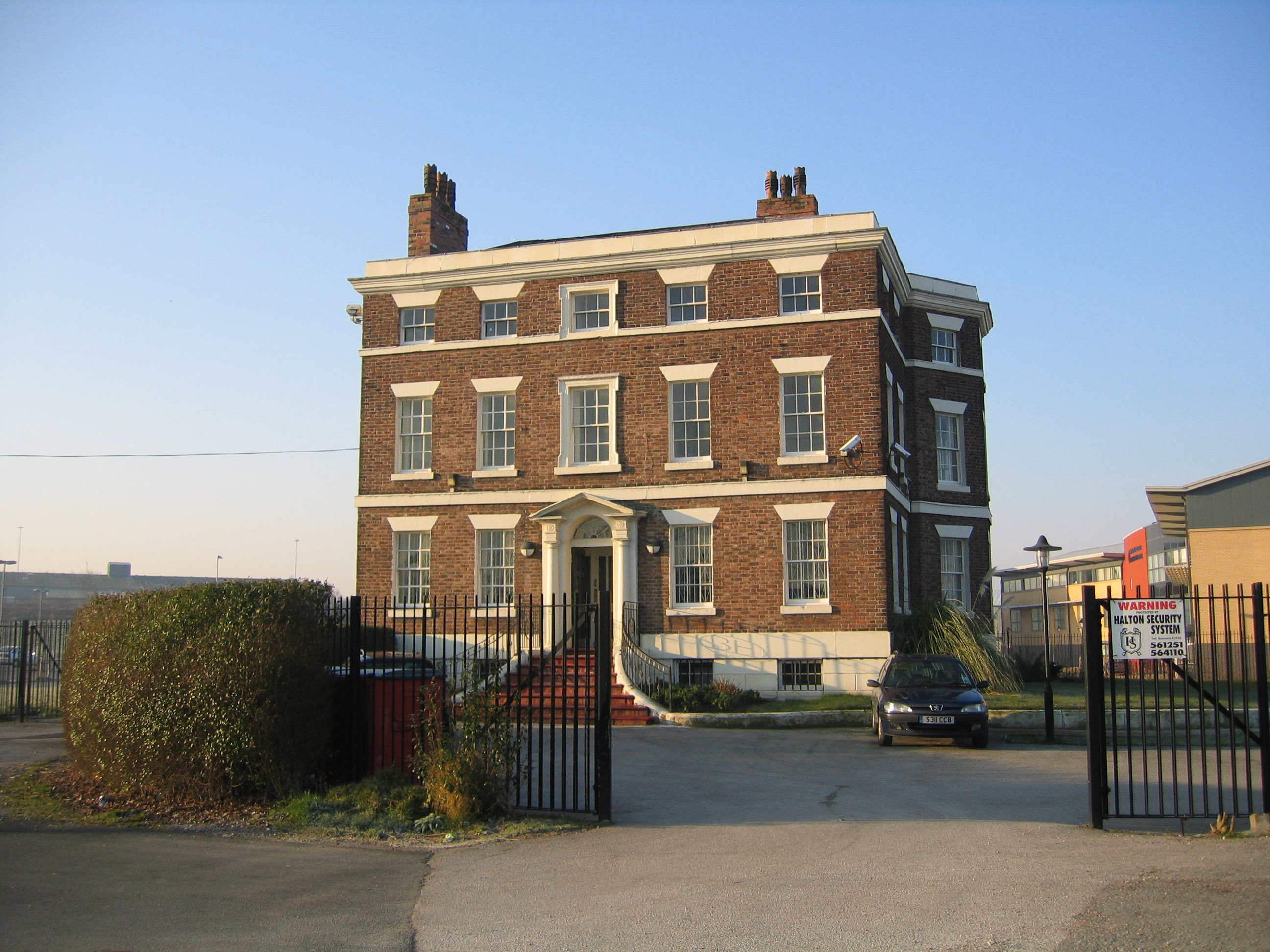
Bridgewater House in 2004

Two further docks were developed on neighbouring Runcorn waterways: Weston Point Docks on the Weston Canal in 1810, and Old Quay Docks on the Runcorn to Latchford Canal in 1826. Thus the port of Runcorn comprised three separate companies: the Bridgewater Trustees, the Mersey and Irwell Company, and the Weaver Trustees.

In the early years of the 19th century, the amount of cargo passing through the docks steadily increased. From 1816 to 1834, the Bridgewater Dock increased its trade from 76,000 tons to 118,000 tons, and the Mersey and Irwell from 90,000 tons to 135,000 tons. To cope with this increased business, the Bridgewater Trustees built a new dock, Francis Dock, which opened in 1843. In 1844, the Mersey and Irwell Company was purchased by the Trustees of the Bridgewater Canal.

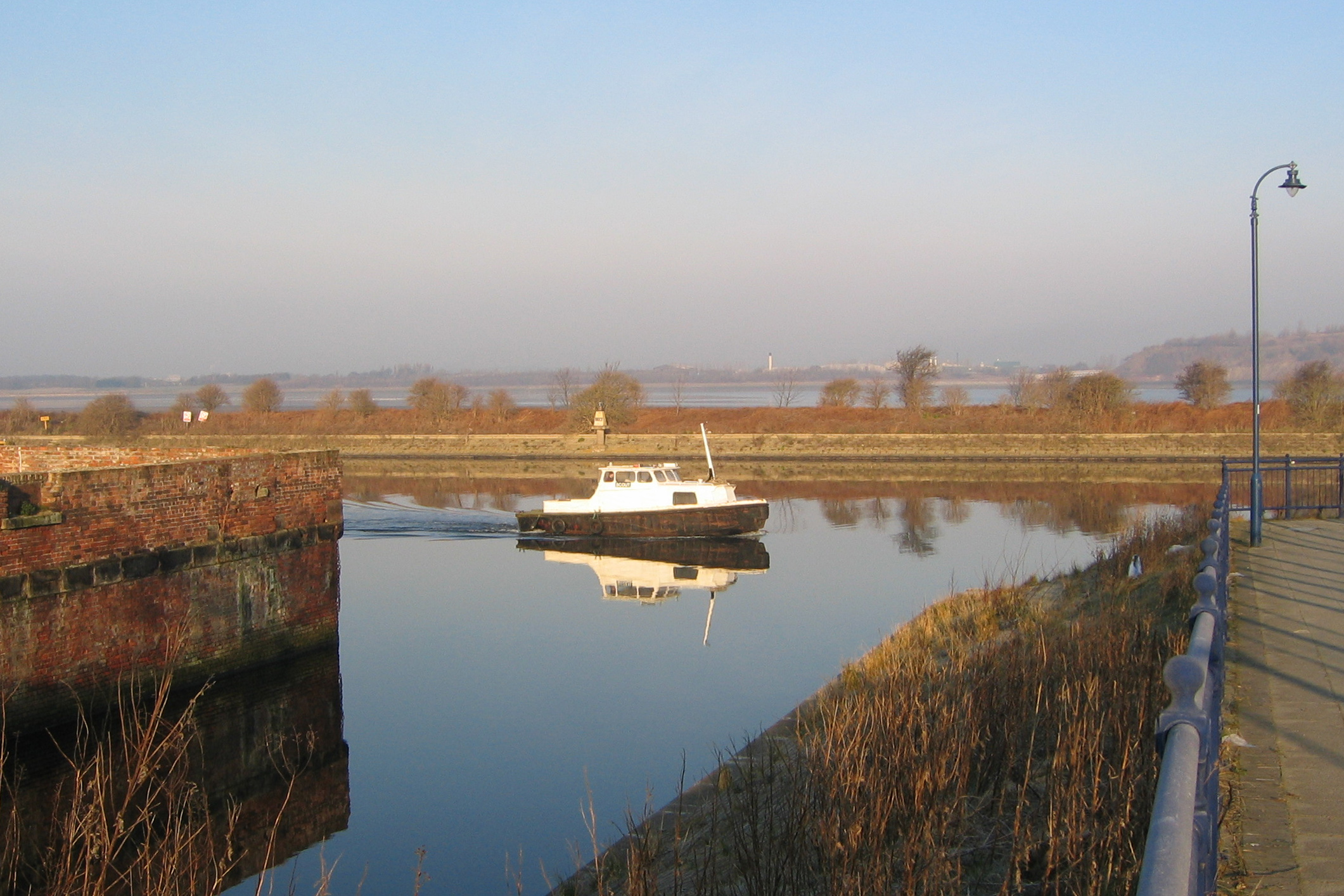
Tidal dock at the end of the Bridgewater Canal in 2004

=== Independent customs port ===
Throughout this time, the port of Runcorn was part of the Port of Liverpool. The growing importance of Runcorn was recognised on 5 April 1847 when it was designated as an independent customs port. Its boundary extended on both sides of the Mersey, from Warrington Bridge in the east to a point on a line stretching from Eastham church in Cheshire to Chapel Farm House in Lancashire. It included the waters of the River Weaver up to Frodsham Bridge. On the north bank of the Mersey, it included Widnes Dock; the world's first purpose-built railway dock. A new customs house was built to mark the event.

Runcorn's status as an independent customs port was not a success. Few large ships were registered in the port or transferred from the Liverpool register, and on 12 April 1850 it returned to the Port of Liverpool. However, the port's prospects improved with the abolition of the Navigation Acts (which had restricted the use of foreign shipping) in 1849, and an increasing number of foreign vessels began to arrive at the docks. Trade increased so much that the Bridgewater Trustees were having difficulty in coping with the increased trade. In 1853, an act promoted by the Earl of Ellesmere led to the construction of a short canal, the Runcorn and Weston Canal, which connected the Bridgewater Docks to the Weston Canal and Weston Point Docks. This opened for traffic on 25 February 1860. In the same year, the Bridgewater Trustees opened Alfred Dock, which was fitted with hydraulic cranes. At this time, the Runcorn docks were coming under increasing competition from the railways, especially from the St Helens Canal and Railway Company which opened Garston Dock downstream on the north bank of the Mersey.

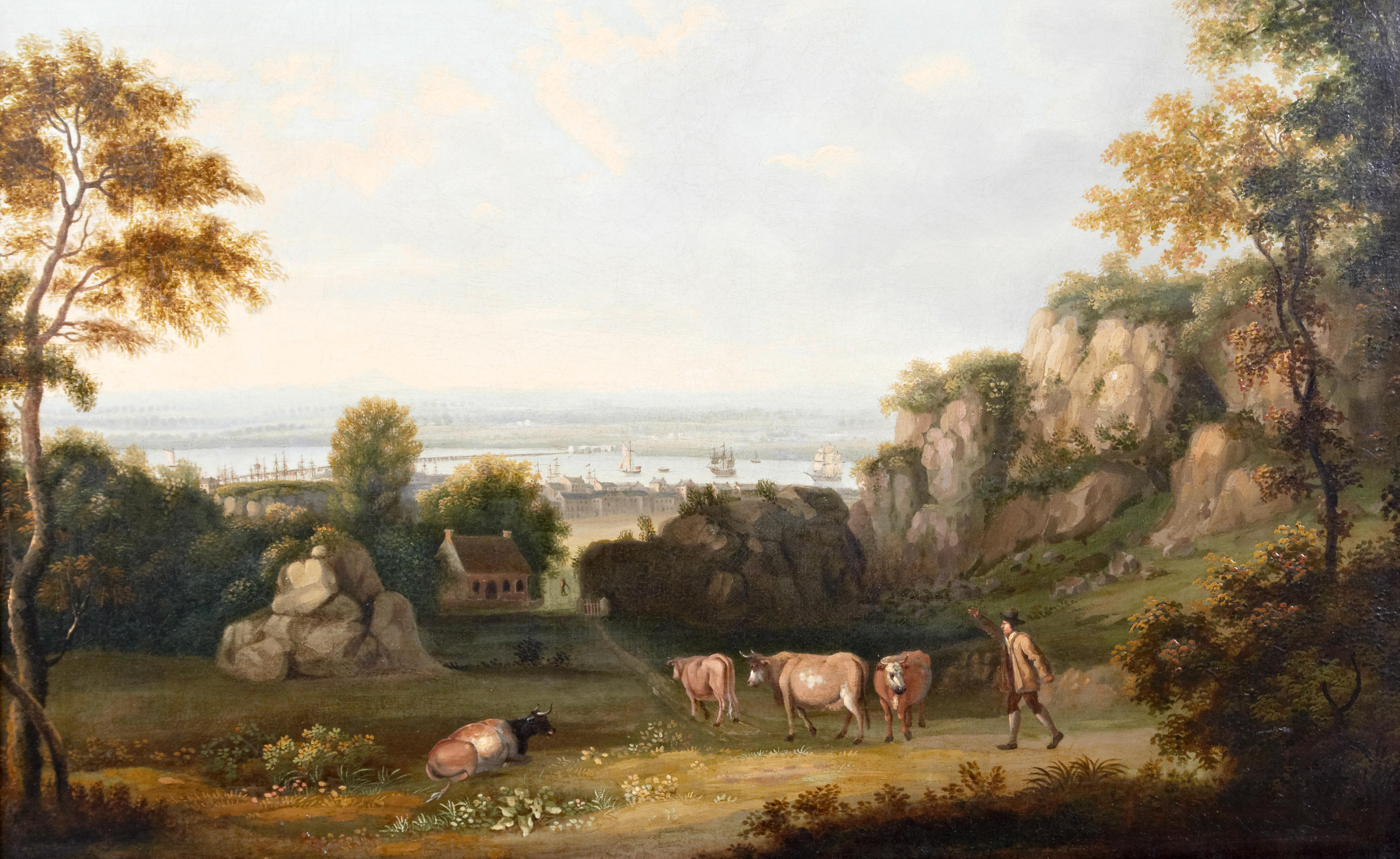
Painting entitled Runcorn Gap by Henry Mark Anthony depicting the Bridgewater Docks and Runcorn Railway Bridge under construction

Runcorn was appointed again as an independent customs port on 1 January 1862. In 1862, a telegraph line was installed which linked the dock with the Bridgewater Trustees' offices in Manchester and their dock in Liverpool. From around this time, there was a considerable increase in trade. In April of that year, over 110 vessels entered the port, which was more than could be conveniently accommodated. In order to deal with the increased trade, the Bridgewater Trustees began to build a new dock in 1867 and to remove obstructions from the river. It was named Arnold Dock and opened in 1870. Before the repeal of the Navigation Acts, most of the trade had been coastal, with virtually no foreign trade in 1845. Whereas in 1871, the export trade amounted to 43,000 tons and the imports more than 30,000. The Mersey and Irwell docks were not as successful as there were no major dock improvements after 1829 and the approach channels silted up. On the north bank of the Mersey, West Bank Dock at Widnes was busy especially with importing raw materials and exporting chemicals and fertilisers. The other major materials passing through the port were raw cotton, potter's clay, salt, coal and soap.

During the 1870s, the business of the port was beginning to decline because of the progressive silting of the shipping channels. When the Duke of Bridgewater died in 1803, he left his coal mining and canal businesses to be run by a Trust. In 1872, the navigation part of the trust was sold to the Bridgewater Navigation Company at a cost of £1,115,000. This consisted of the Bridgewater Canal and the Mersey and Irwell Navigations, together with their docks and warehouses. The company developed further improvements including a new dock, the Fenton Dock (named after the chairman of the company), which was completed in 1875 at a cost of £50,000. This was equipped with hydraulic cranes and served by high level tramways and railway sidings. Meanwhile, the Weaver Trustees were developing their trade, having built the Delamere Dock in 1870. The engineer for this dock was Edward Leader Williams who later became the engineer for the Manchester Ship Canal. There were no further large scale developments at the port until the Tollemache Dock was opened at Weston Point in 1885.

=== Coming of the Manchester Ship Canal ===
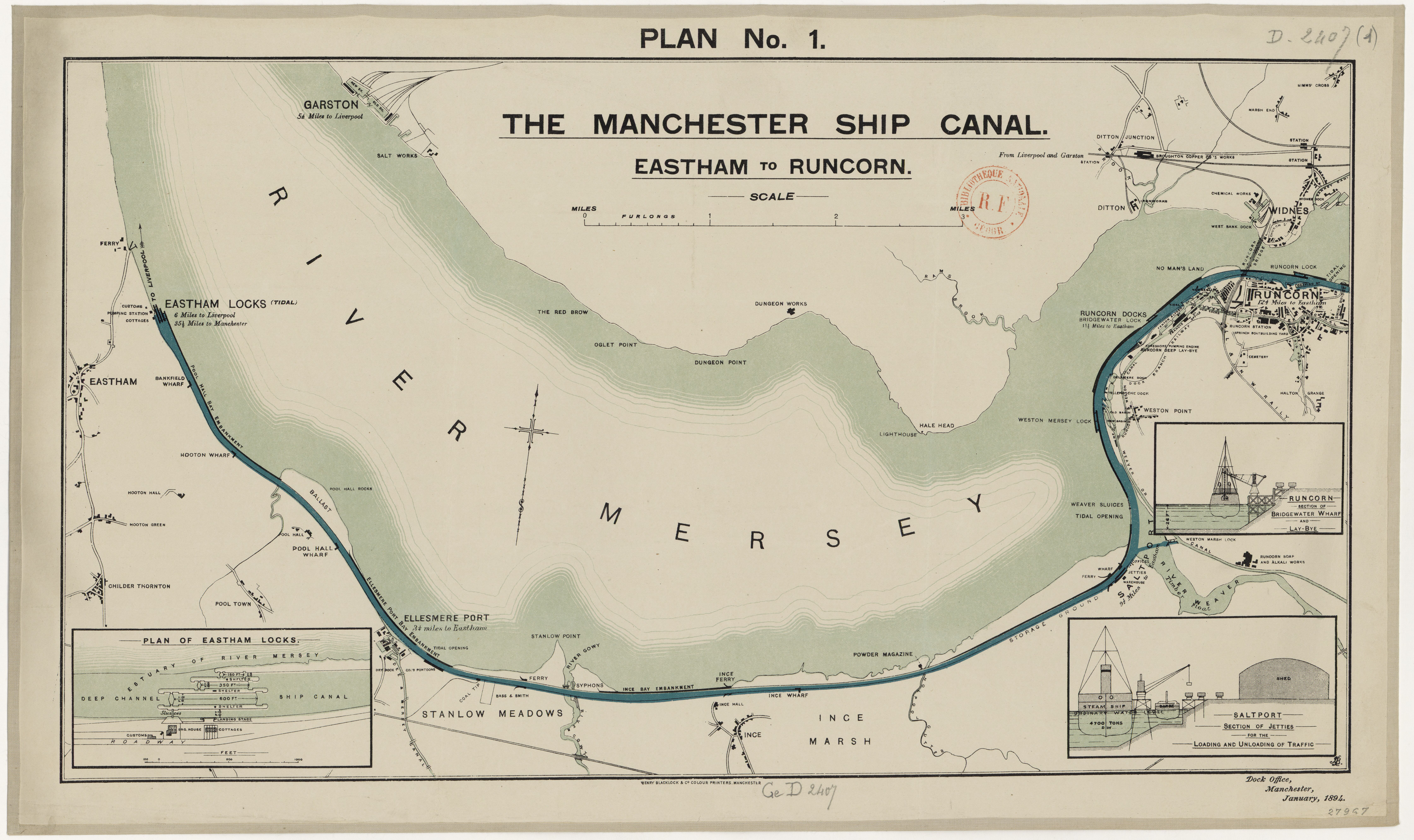
The route of the Manchester Ship Canal from Eastham to Runcorn

From about 1877, the silting of the channels started to improve and trade improved again. The improvement continued until 1889 when the construction of the Manchester Ship Canal caused problems. Trade declined again, and in 1894 the independent customs Port of Runcorn was abolished and incorporated into the Port of Manchester. Construction of the ship canal began in November 1877. On 3 August 1887, the Manchester Ship Canal Company purchased the Bridgewater Navigation Company for £1,710,000, thus acquiring the Bridgewater Canal and its docks and the Mersey and Irwell system. The ship canal allowed large ocean-going ships to access the Port of Runcorn. The canal was completed from Eastham to Weston Point by 1892, and in July of that year a temporary port called Saltport was established at the mouth of the River Weaver. By 1893, the ship canal was opened as far as the Old Quay Dock. In order to allow direct access to the Port of Runcorn and the Weaver Navigation, four locks were built. Weston Marsh lock at the mouth of the Weaver allowed access to the Weaver Navigation; Weston Mersey lock enabled entrance to the Weaver Docks; the Bridgewater docks were served by the Bridgewater lock; and the Old Quay dock by the Runcorn Old Quay lock. The ship canal was opened throughout its length in 1894. Saltport was bypassed and a few years later it was dismantled. To the east of the Bridgewater Dock, the ship canal passes under Runcorn Railway Bridge which has a clearance of 75 feet (23 m) above the high water mark of the Mersey. This meant that the larger of the tall ships could not pass under the bridge. A lay-by was therefore built for these ships to discharge their cargo, which was carried onwards by a lighter to its destination. The lay-by was big enough to accommodate the largest merchant vessels of the day. While the larger vessels approached the Runcorn docks by way of the ship canal, the smaller vessels sailed up the Mersey and entered the docks through the locks.

=== Decline and recovery ===
From the opening of the ship canal there was a temporary improvement in trade for the Runcorn docks but a decline set in from the turn of the century. There was a short revival after the First World War but this was not maintained. Improvements were made to Bridgewater Docks in 1935 but by 1950 the docks were "virtually moribund". Trade at Runcorn Docks declined from 124,428 tons in 1925 to 32,881 tons in 1951, and at Weston Point Docks from 200,000 tons in 1938 to 40,000 tons in 1954. The old line of locks from the Bridgewater Canal was disused by the late 1930s. They were closed and filled in under the Ship Canal Act 1949. The Ship Canal Act of 1966 allowed the closure of the new line of locks, the old dock area and the Francis and Arnold Docks. The former Tidal Basin of the Bridgewater Docks assumed the name Francis Dock after the latter was filled in. The Runcorn and Weston Canal was filled in to provide additional quay space for modern docks and the old warehouses were demolished.

With the construction of the Silver Jubilee Bridge in 1961, communications to the docks were improved and trade began to recover. The dock entrance to the ship canal was widened and the docks deepened. Trade increased from 50,000 tons in 1957 to 773,000 tons in 1973. In the month of December 2014, the Docks saw 50,126 tons of cargo in trade, the highest monthly tonnage recorded in the last quarter of a century.

== Present day ==
Runcorn Docks is owned by the Manchester Ship Canal Company which is part of the Peel Ports Group. It comprises Francis Dock (formerly the Tidal Basin, now berths No. 1–2), Alfred Dock (berths No. 3–5), and Fenton Dock (berths No. 6–9). It can take ships with cargoes up to 5000 tonnes with a maximum length of 350 feet (107m) and maximum draught of 7 metres. The adjacent canal lay-by has a deepwater berth of 168m. It has pipelines handling chemical and other liquid cargoes connecting to adjacent storage facilities and to the Ineos Chlor network.

== See also ==
- Weston Point Docks
