= Weston Point Docks =

Inland port in Runcorn, Cheshire, England

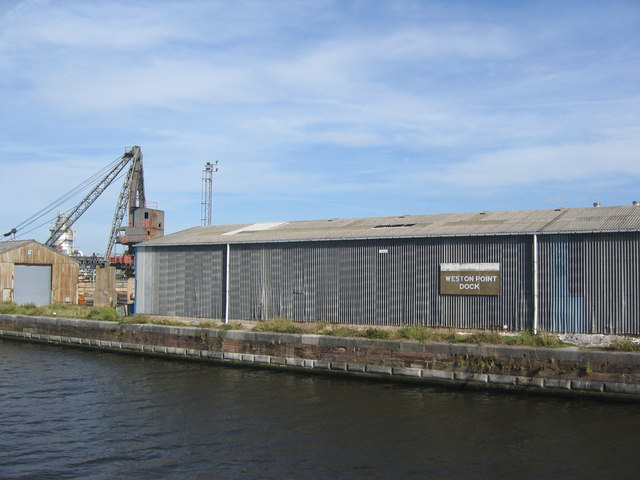
- Warehouse on the Manchester Ship Canal

Location
- Location: Runcorn, Cheshire
- Coordinates: 53.3266°N 2.7601°W
- OS grid: SJ494813

Details
- Operator: FLX Logistics
- Opened: 1810
- Type: Inland port
- Purpose: Cargo transfer
- Joins: Manchester Ship Canal, Weston Canal

Weston Point Docks, also known as the Port of Weston, is an inland port on the Manchester Ship Canal in the town of Runcorn, Cheshire, England. It is operated by FLX Logistics.

== History ==
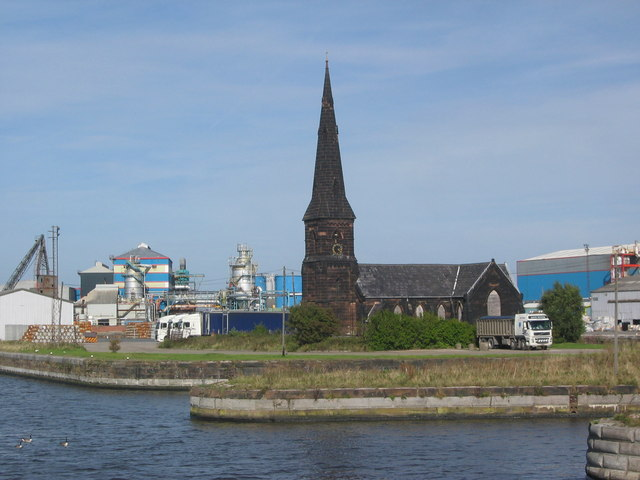
Christ Church, Weston Point

In 1810, the Weaver Navigation Company completed the Weston Canal between Frodsham and the Weston Point area of Runcorn to avoid the difficult entrance to the mouth of the River Weaver, and a dock was established at Weston Point. The Old Basin is still extant but no longer accessible to shipping. The New Basin, built between 1850 and 1856, was filled in between 1963 and 1966.

In 1841, an Anglican church, Christ Church, was constructed on the site of the docks, now redundant but a listed building.

In 1859, a short section of canal called the Runcorn and Weston Canal was built which would link Weston Point Docks on the Weston Canal with Runcorn Docks on the Bridgewater Canal.

Two further docks, the Delamere (1865-1870) and the Tollemache (1885), were built and now form one dock, the Delamache.

The Manchester Ship Canal opened in 1894. This canal now services the docks as opposed to the Weston Canal and the Weaver Navigation.

== Present ==
In August 2007, the owners of the Port of Weston, The Westbury Property Fund, merged with the Eddie Stobart Group to form the Stobart Group. The group planned to develop the site into an inter-modal port facility to enable freight, currently carried by road, to be transported by rail and water. This would mean increased warehousing, new container handling facilities, an extension to the existing West Coast Main Line rail siding, a new link road, and improved navigable access between the dock and the Manchester Ship Canal. The plans were not implemented, however, and the docks are now operated by FLX Logistics.

== See also ==
- Runcorn Docks
