= Christ Church, Weston Point =

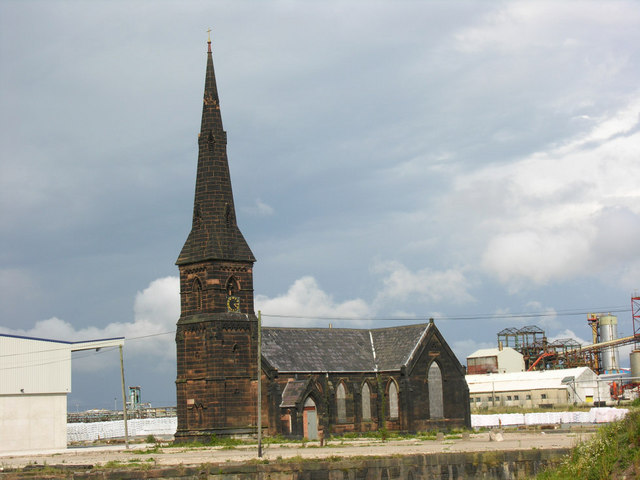
- Christ Church, Weston Point
- Christ Church, Weston Point
- 53.3287°N 2.7610°W
- OS grid reference: SJ 494,815
- Location: Weston Point, Runcorn, Cheshire
- Country: England
- Denomination: Anglican

History
- Consecrated: 21 December 1841

Architecture
- Functional status: Redundant
- Heritage designation: Grade II
- Designated: 5 April 1990
- Architect: Edmund Sharpe
- Architectural type: Church
- Style: Gothic Revival
- Completed: 1841; 185 years ago

Specifications
- Materials: Sandstone

Christ Church is a former Anglican parish church, now redundant, at Weston Point Docks, Runcorn, Cheshire, England. It is recorded in the National Heritage List for England as a designated Grade II listed building.

== History ==
From 1720 improvements were made to the River Weaver to make it more navigable for transport from the salt mines in the Winsford area of Cheshire to the River Mersey, creating the Weaver Navigation. In 1839 the Weaver Navigation Trustees received a petition from its employees to allow them "the privilege of resting on the Sabbath day" and to "have an opportunity of attending Divine Service". Previous Acts of Parliament had already prohibited bargemen from having to work on Sundays. On 12 August 1839 the Trustees passed a by-law forbidding traffic on the Navigation between midnight on Saturday and midnight on Sunday. On 4 August 1840 a Weaver Navigation Act was passed to authorise the Trustees to use part of their funds to build one or more churches for their employees. Christ Church, Weston Point, was one of these churches, the others being Holy Trinity, Northwich, and Christ Church, Winsford. The architect gaining the commission for all three churches was Edmund Sharpe of Lancaster.

The foundation stone of Christ Church was laid by Sir Richard Brooke of Norton Priory, and the church was consecrated on 21 December 1841 by Rt Rev John Bird Sumner, Bishop of Chester. It provided seating for about 400 people. The stone from a nearby quarry was given by its owner John Tomkinson. The spire of the church was rebuilt in 1898 following a fire.

When it was built, the church stood on a headland jutting out into the River Mersey. However the Manchester Ship Canal was built on its river-side, and the Runcorn and Weston Canal on the land-side, leaving it on an island. At this time it was said to be the only church in Britain in use on an uninhabited island. On 1 June 1995 it was declared redundant, and on 10 June 2004 it was granted provision to be used as an office, for storage and as a monument. In 2002 the interior of the church was vandalised by thieves, and all the fittings were taken. The building now stands within the Port of Weston and is inaccessible to the public. As of 2011 the land on which the church stands is owned by the Stobart Group of companies and operated by FLX Logistics.

== Architecture ==
The church is built in local sandstone. It is in Geometric Gothic style. The plan of the church is cruciform, consisting of a four-bay nave, a single-bay chancel, north and south single-bay transepts, a small southwest porch, and a tower with a broach spire at the west end. The tower is in three stages and rises to a height of 95 feet (29.0 m). It is supported by angle gabled buttresses. The stages are divided by string courses. The bottom stage contains blocked trefoils on the north and south sides, a pair of single-light windows on the west, and a doorway on the north side. In the middle stage is a trefoil window on the south side, and single-light windows on the north and south sides. The top stage contains two-light bell openings on each side, with an inserted clock on the south side. The spire is octagonal, contains three tiers of gabled lucarnes, and is surmounted by a finial and a cross. At the east end of the church is a three-light window containing tracery, and each bay of the nave contains a double lancet window. The transepts have two-light windows on their east and west sides and, in the gables, a three-light window with a trefoil window above. At the base of the tower is a small vestry. There are stone crosses on the north and south ends of the roof; originally there was a cross on the east end, but this is no longer present. The church is floored with Yorkshire stone that was carried to the site of the church via the Leeds and Liverpool Canal. The bell, cast by Thomas Mears of the Whitechapel Bell Foundry, was installed in 1842. The church used to stand in a rectangular plot of land, surrounded by spiked wrought iron railings. On the south side was a pair of gates.

== See also ==
- Listed buildings in Runcorn (urban area)
- List of architectural works by Edmund Sharpe
