= George Samuel Fereday Smith =

English industrialist and canal manager

George Samuel Fereday Smith (7 May 1812 – 26 May 1891) was an English industrialist and canal manager who from 1837 to 1887 was the Deputy Superintendent of the Bridgewater Trustees and their successors, whose major source of income came from the Bridgewater Canal.

== Early life and education ==
Fereday Smith was born in 1812 at Tipton, Staffordshire, the elder son of Richard Smith, an ironmaster and Elizabeth Fereday, the daughter of Samuel Fereday, who was also an ironmaster. He was educated at Charterhouse and University College, London before going to Queen's College, Oxford where he graduated as Bachelor of Arts in mathematics and physics in 1835. He then went to Germany to study mining and geology, after which he returned to Staffordshire where he gained practical experience of mining and surveying. At the beginning of 1837 he was working as an engineer on the Birmingham and Gloucester Railway, when in March, at the age of 24, he was appointed as Deputy Superintendent of the Bridgewater Trustees at a salary of £600 a year.

== Career ==
The Superintendent of the Bridgewater Trustees was James Loch. Loch was extremely busy because of his involvement in other matters, which left Fereday Smith in charge of the detailed administration of the Trust. In addition to the Bridgewater Canal, the Trust administered the Bridgewater Collieries, the home farms, the Bridgewater Estate, a lime-burning business, Worsley Yard and, from 1848, the Mersey and Irwell Navigation. During this time, the canals were in serious competition with the railways, and Fereday Smith met the competition "with great vigour". He was greatly in favour of capital investment and the facilities he instigated included Egerton Dock at Liverpool, the Runcorn and Weston Canal, and the Alfred Dock at Runcorn. He installed an electric telegraph along the banks of the canal.

Fereday Smith and James Lock were not always in agreement, but Fereday Smith's influence in the business increased after Loch's death in 1855. From that time he was in effect the general manager of the undertaking, Loch's successor Algernon Egerton having less influence than Loch. During the time of Fereday Smith's management, the profit from the canal and the collieries increased considerably. He continued in his post when the control of the business passed from the Trustees to the Bridgewater Navigation Company in 1872 but retired when the Manchester Ship Canal Company took over ownership in 1887.

== Personal life and honours ==
In 1845 Fereday Smith married Mary Jane Hampson and the couple had two daughters and a son. He became financially prosperous, partly from his income, which had increased to £1,500 a year by 1864, and partly through a private income gained through his marriage. In his late thirties he studied at the Inner Temple and was called to the bar in 1852. He had wide interests outside the Trust. He was a fellow of the Geological Society and the Royal Geographical Society and a member of the Chetham Society. He served as a Conservative councillor in Manchester from 1846 to 1849 and was also a borough magistrate. In the early 1870s he bought Grovehurst, a country house in Kent, and was appointed High Sheriff of Kent in 1884. He died in London in 1891 and was succeeded in his post by his son, Richard Clifford Smith.

== See also ==
- Canals of the United Kingdom
- History of the British canal system
