= 1846 Manchester Borough Council election =

Local election in Manchester

- 2 November 1846

17 of 64 seats to Manchester Borough Council 33 seats needed for a majority

Elections to Manchester Borough Council were held on Monday, 2 November 1846. One third of the councillors seats were up for election, with each successful candidate to serve a three-year term of office.

== Ward results ==
=== All Saints' ===
All Saints'
Party	Candidate	Votes	%	±%
	James Taylor	uncontested		
		Swing		

=== Ardwick ===
Ardwick
Party	Candidate	Votes	%	±%
	John Youil	uncontested		
		Swing		

=== Cheetham ===
Cheetham
Party	Candidate	Votes	%	±%
Liberal	James Bradford*	174	58.8	N/A
	William Aldred	122	41.2	N/A
Majority		52	17.6	N/A
Turnout		296		
Liberal hold		Swing		

=== Collegiate Church ===
Collegiate Church (2 vacancies)
Party	Candidate	Votes	%	±%
Liberal	Matthew Thackray	396	50.8	N/A
Liberal	Abel Heywood*	383	49.2	N/A
Ratepayers	John Middleton	364	46.7	N/A
Ratepayers	Caleb Davenport	269	34.5	N/A
Majority		19	2.5	N/A
Turnout		779		
Liberal hold		Swing		
Liberal hold		Swing		

=== Exchange ===
Exchange
Party	Candidate	Votes	%	±%
Liberal	William Medcalf	209	52.9	N/A
Ratepayers	James Hibbert	186	47.1	N/A
Majority		23	5.8	N/A
Turnout		395		
Liberal hold		Swing		

=== Medlock Street ===
Medlock Street
Party	Candidate	Votes	%	±%
Ratepayers	William Cottrell	255	56.3	N/A
Liberal	John Richardson White*	198	43.7	−9.1
Majority		57	12.6	
Turnout		453		
Ratepayers gain from Liberal		Swing		

=== New Cross ===
New Cross
Party	Candidate	Votes	%	±%
Conservative	Joseph Lamb	uncontested		
	Thomas Webster	uncontested		
Conservative gain from Liberal		Swing		
		Swing		

=== Oxford ===
Oxford
Party	Candidate	Votes	%	±%
Liberal	Joseph Adshead	277	59.4	N/A
Liberal	James Bake*	189	40.6	N/A
Majority		57	18.8	N/A
Turnout		466		
Liberal gain from Liberal		Swing		

=== St. Ann's ===
St. Ann's
Party	Candidate	Votes	%	±%
Liberal	Samuel Phillips Hitchcock	397	79.6	N/A
	Malcolm Ross	102	20.4	N/A
Majority		295	59.2	N/A
Turnout		499		
Liberal hold		Swing		

=== St. Clement's ===
St. Clement's
Party	Candidate	Votes	%	±%
	Joseph Shiers	35	83.3	N/A
	Robert Hall	17	20.4	N/A
Majority		28	66.6	N/A
Turnout		42		
		Swing		

=== St. George's ===
St. George's
Party	Candidate	Votes	%	±%
Conservative	John Pooley	uncontested		
Conservative gain from Liberal		Swing		

=== St. James' ===
St. James'
Party	Candidate	Votes	%	±%
Liberal	William Hyde Lamb	271	52.1	N/A
Liberal	Thomas Bayley Potter	249	47.9	N/A
Majority		22	4.2	N/A
Turnout		520		
Liberal gain from Liberal		Swing		

=== St. John's ===
St. John's
Party	Candidate	Votes	%	±%
Conservative	George Fereday Smith	241	53.0	N/A
Ratepayers	William Bowker	214	47.0	N/A
Majority		27	6.0	N/A
Turnout		455		
Conservative hold		Swing		

=== St. Luke's ===
St. Luke's
Party	Candidate	Votes	%	±%
	William Edwards	uncontested		
		Swing		

=== St. Michael's ===
St. Michael's
Party	Candidate	Votes	%	±%
	John Boardman	uncontested		
		Swing		
