= West Bank Dock =

Coordinates: 53°20′58″N 2°43′52″W

West Bank Dock was situated on the River Mersey at Widnes.

It was built in 1864 to cater for the growing chemical industry.

It took over some of the traffic of the Widnes Dock.

The dock closed in the 1970s.

In 2008, the Stobart Group had received a contract for "the demolition of an unused industrial estate and the cleanup of acres of contaminated land at the West Bank Dock Estate in Widnes." from the Northwest Regional Development Agency. The new Mersey Multimodal Gateway will be built on the old West Bank Dock Estate.
