= Bridgewater House, Runcorn =

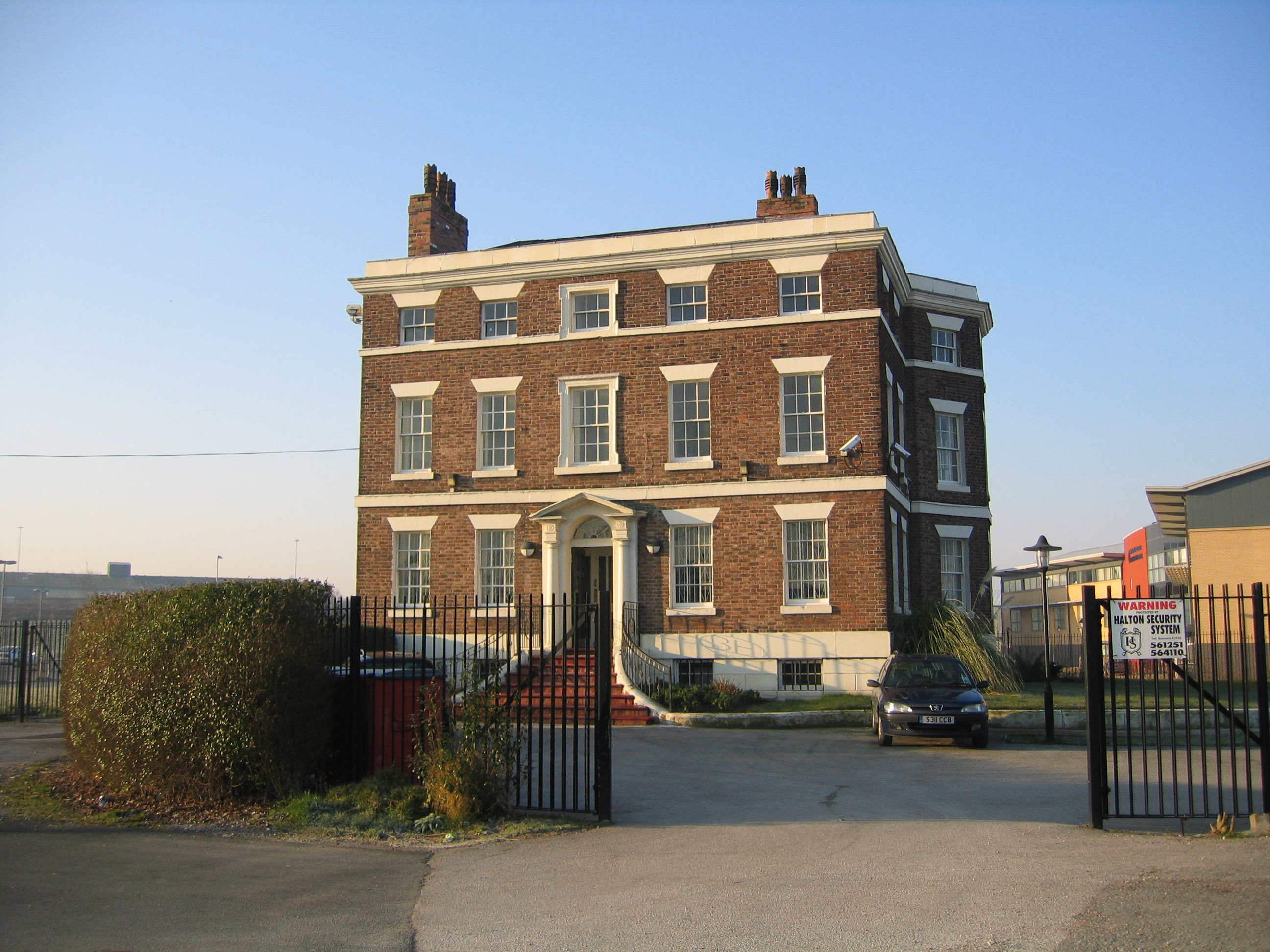
- Bridgewater House in 2004

- Location in Cheshire
- 53.34247°N 2.74595°W
- Location: Old Coach Road, Runcorn, Cheshire, England
- OS grid reference: SJ 504 832

History
- Built: 1760s
- Built for: Duke of Bridgewater

Site notes
- Architectural style: Georgian
- Governing body: Bridgewater Property Management

Listed Building – Grade II
- Designated: 7 December 1965
- Reference no.: 1330334

Bridgewater House is in the Old Coach Road, Runcorn, Cheshire, England. It is recorded in the National Heritage List for England as a designated Grade II listed building. Originally built for the use of the Duke of Bridgewater, it has since been used for various purposes and has now been converted into offices.

== History ==
Bridgewater House was built in 1771, near the lower end of a line of ten locks leading from the Runcorn basin of the Bridgewater Canal to the River Mersey. It was the occasional residence of the Duke of Bridgewater when he was supervising the building and operation of the Runcorn branch of the canal. The canal was opened to the Mersey in 1773 and completed throughout its length in 1776. After the Duke's death in 1803 the house was used as offices by the Bridgewater Trustees, and from 1872 by the Bridgewater Navigation Company. In 1887 the assets of this company, including the house, were bought by the Manchester Ship Canal Company, who used it mainly for the purpose of entertaining. At the outbreak of the Second World War, part of the house was taken over by the Balloon Section of the Royal Air Force. In 1943 the whole house was requisitioned by the Air Ministry. After the war the house returned to the ownership of the Manchester Ship Canal Company and its future became uncertain. In 1998 a fire damaged the roof and many of the rooms.

== Architecture ==
The house is built in brown brick with a slate roof and stone dressings in Georgian style. Its consists of 2½ storeys with a basement. The entrance front has five bays and the canal front seven bays. Steps lead up to the entrance which has a stone Doric doorcase and the entrance front is rusticated up to the ground floor level. There are stone bands at the first and second sill levels and at the top is a stone cornice with a brick parapet. The roof is hipped. The authors of the Buildings of England series describe the house as being "imposing".

== Present use ==
The house has been repaired and restored and is now owned by Bridgewater Property Management. This company uses it partly for its own purposes and leases the rest of the building as offices for other companies.

== See also ==
- Listed buildings in Runcorn (urban area)
