= Bridgewater Canal =

Canal in northwest England

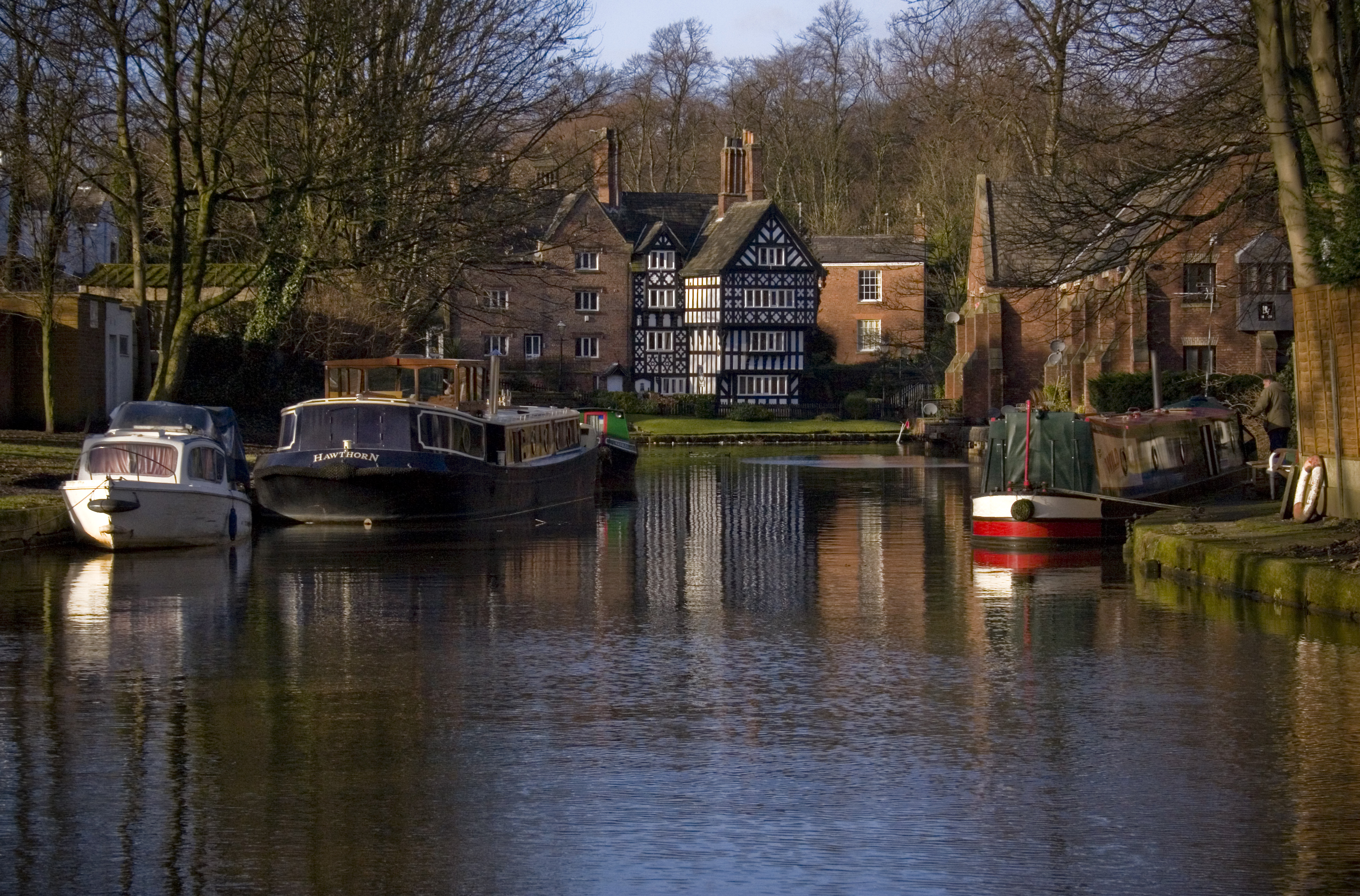
- The Packet House at Worsley, on the canal
- Interactive map of Bridgewater Canal

Specifications
- Length: 41 miles (66 km)
- Maximum boat length: 72 ft 0 in (21.95 m)
- Maximum boat beam: 14 ft 9 in (4.50 m)
- Locks: 0 (originally 10 at Runcorn) (See article)
- Status: Open
- Navigation authority: Peel Holdings

History
- Principal engineer: John Gilbert, James Brindley
- Date of act: 1759, 1760, 1762, 1766, 1795
- Date of first use: 1761; 265 years ago
- Date completed: 1761; 265 years ago
- Date extended: 1762; 264 years ago

Geography
- Start point: Worsley
- End point: Runcorn (originally Manchester) (See article)
- Connects to: Rochdale Canal, Trent and Mersey Canal, Leeds and Liverpool Canal, Manchester Ship Canal

The Bridgewater Canal connects Runcorn, Manchester and Leigh, in North West England. It was commissioned by Francis Egerton, 3rd Duke of Bridgewater, to transport coal from his mines in Worsley to Manchester. It was opened in 1761 from Worsley to Manchester, and later extended from Manchester to Runcorn, and then from Worsley to Leigh.

The canal is connected to the Manchester Ship Canal via a lock at Cornbrook; to the Rochdale Canal in Manchester; to the Trent and Mersey Canal at Preston Brook, southeast of Runcorn; and to the Leeds and Liverpool Canal at Leigh. It once connected with the River Mersey at Runcorn but has since been cut off by a slip road to the Silver Jubilee Bridge. Following the re-routing of roads to the Silver Jubilee Bridge, the Runcorn Locks Restoration Society campaigns to reinstate the flight of locks.

The Bridgewater Canal is described as the first great achievement of the canal age, although the Sankey Canal opened earlier. Bridgewater captured the public imagination because of its engineering feats; it required the construction of an aqueduct to cross the River Irwell, and a tunnel at Worsley. Its success helped inspire a period of intense canal building in Britain, known as Canal Mania. It later faced intense competition from the Liverpool and Manchester Railway and the Macclesfield Canal. Navigable throughout its history, it is one of the few canals in Britain not to have been nationalised, and remains privately owned. Pleasure craft now use the canal which forms part of the Cheshire Ring network of canals.

== Design and construction ==
Francis Egerton, 3rd Duke of Bridgewater, owned some of the coal mines dug to supply North West England with fuel for the steam engines instrumental in powering England's Industrial Revolution. The duke transported his coal along the Mersey and Irwell Navigation and also by packhorse, but each method was inefficient and expensive; river transport was subject to the vagaries of river navigation, and the amount of coal packhorses could carry was limited by its relative weight. The duke's underground mines also suffered from persistent flooding, caused by the geology of the Middle Coal Measures, where the coal seam lies beneath a layer of permeable sandstone.

Bridgewater Canal Act 1758
- Act of Parliament
- Parliament of Great Britain
- Long title: An Act to enable the most Noble Francis Duke of Bridgewater to make a Navigable Cut, or Canal, from a certain Place in the Township of Salford, to or near Worsley Mill and Middlewood in the Manor of Worsley, and to or near a Place called Hollin Ferry in the County Palatine of Lancaster.
- Citation: 32 Geo. 2. c. 2 Pr.
- Territorial extent: Great Britain

Dates
- Royal assent: 23 March 1759
- Commencement: 23 November 1758 (Note: Start of session.)
Other legislation
Relates to	Bridgewater Canal Act 1759; Bridgewater Canal Extension Act 1762; Bridgewater Canal Act 1766; Bridgwater Canal Act 1795

Status: Current legislation

Having visited the Canal du Midi in France and watched the construction of the Sankey Canal in England, the duke's solution to these problems was to build an underground canal at Worsley, connected to a surface canal between Worsley and Salford. In addition to easing overland transport difficulties and providing drainage for his mines, an underground canal would provide a reliable source of water for the surface canal, and also eliminate the need to lift the coal to the surface (an expensive and difficult proposition). The canal boats would carry 30 long tons (30 t) at a time, pulled by only one horse – more than ten times the amount of cargo per horse that was possible with a cart. The duke and his estate manager John Gilbert produced a plan of the canal, and in 1759 obtained an act of Parliament, the Bridgewater Canal Act 1758 (32 Geo. 2. c. 2 Pr.), enabling its construction. (Note: An Act to enable the most noble Francis Duke of Bridgewater, to make a navigable cut or canal from a certain place in the township of Salford, to or near Worsley Mill, and Middlewood, in the manor of Worsley, and to or near a place called Hollin Ferry, in the county palatine of Lancaster.)

Bridgewater Canal Act 1759
- Act of Parliament
- Parliament of Great Britain
- Long title: An Act to enable the most Noble Francis Duke of Bridgewater to make a Navigable Cut, or Canal, from or near Worsley Mill, over the River Irwell, to the Town of Manchester in the County Palatine of Lancaster, and to or near Longford Bridge in the Township of Stretford in the said County.
- Citation: 33 Geo. 2. c. 2 Pr.
- Territorial extent: Great Britain

Dates
- Royal assent: 24 March 1760
- Commencement: 13 November 1759
Other legislation
Relates to	Bridgewater Canal Act 1758; Bridgewater Canal Extension Act 1762; Bridgewater Canal Act 1766; Bridgwater Canal Act 1795

Status: Current legislation

James Brindley was brought in for his technical expertise (having previously installed a pumping system at the nearby Wet Earth Colliery), and after a six-day visit suggested varying the route of the proposed canal away from Salford, instead taking it across the River Irwell to Stretford and thereon into Manchester. This route would make connecting to any future canals much easier, and would also increase competition with the Mersey and Irwell Navigation company. Brindley moved into Worsley Old Hall and spent 46 days surveying the proposed route, which to cross the Irwell would require the construction of an aqueduct at Barton-upon-Irwell. At the duke's behest, in January 1760 Brindley also travelled to London to give evidence before a parliamentary committee. The duke therefore gained a second act of Parliament, the Bridgewater Canal Act 1759 (33 Geo. 2. c. 2 Pr.), which superseded the original. (Note: An Act to enable the most noble Francis Duke of Bridgewater, to make a navigable cut or canal from a certain place in the township of Salford, over the Irwell, to the town of Manchester, in the county palatine of Lancaster, and to or near Longford Bridge, in the township of Stretford, in the said county.)

Brindley's planned route began at Worsley and passed southeast through Eccles, before turning south to cross the River Irwell on the Barton Aqueduct. From there it continued southeast along the edge of Trafford Park, and then east into Manchester. Although a connection with the Mersey and Irwell Navigation was included in the new act, at Hulme Locks in Castlefield (on land previously occupied by Hulme Hall), this was not completed until 1838. The terminus would be at Castlefield Basin, where the nearby River Medlock was to help supply the canal with water. Boats would unload their cargoes inside the duke's purpose-built warehouse. There were no locks in Brindley's design, demonstrating his ability as a competent engineer. The Barton Aqueduct was built relatively quickly for the time; work commenced in September 1760 and the first boat crossed on 17 July 1761.

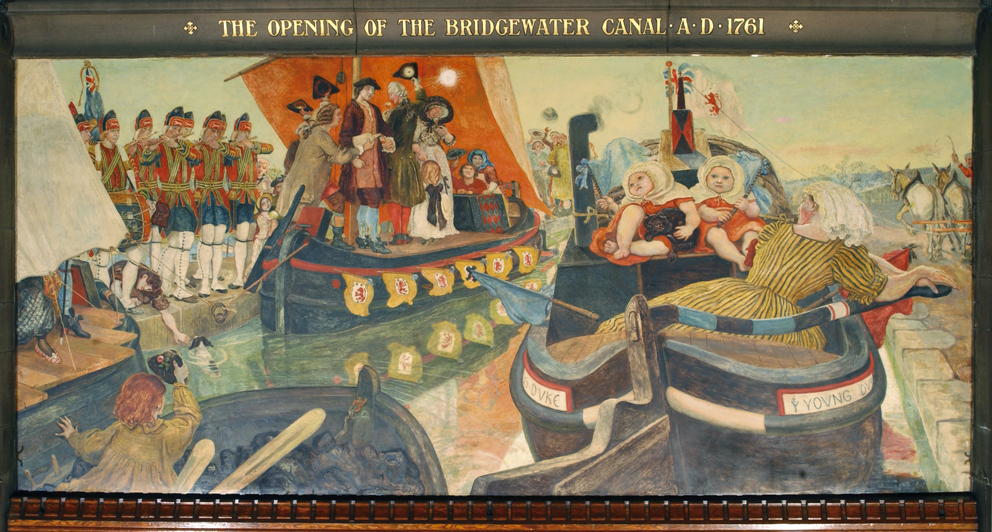
The Opening of the Bridgewater Canal A.D. 1761 by Ford Madox Brown, one of The Manchester Murals at Manchester Town Hall

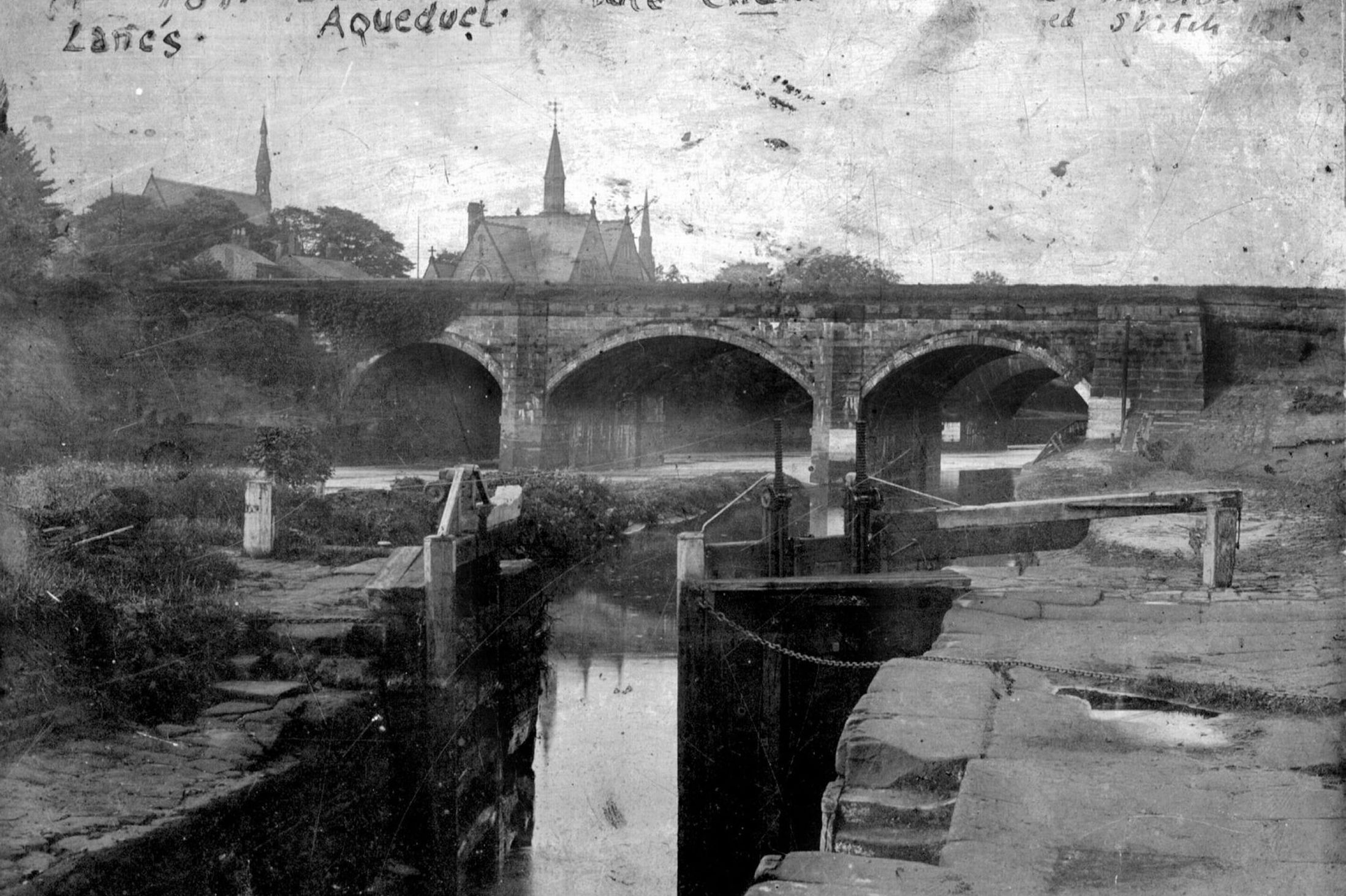
Brindley's aqueduct, replaced late in the 19th century

The duke invested a large sum of money in the scheme. From Worsley to Manchester its construction cost £168,000 (equivalent to £31,000,000 in 2025), but its advantages over land and river transport meant that within a year of its opening in 1761, the price of coal in Manchester fell by about half. This success helped inspire a period of intense canal building, known as Canal Mania. Along with its stone aqueduct at Barton-upon-Irwell, the Bridgewater Canal was considered a major engineering achievement. One commentator wrote that when finished, "[the canal] will be the most extraordinary thing in the Kingdom, if not in Europe. The boats in some places are to go underground, and in other places over a navigable river, without communicating with its waters".

In addition to the duke's warehouse at Manchester, more buildings were built by Brindley and extended to Alport Street (now called Deansgate). The warehouses were of timber-frame design, with load-bearing hand-made brick walls, supported on cast iron posts. The duke's warehouse was badly damaged by fire in 1789 but was rebuilt.

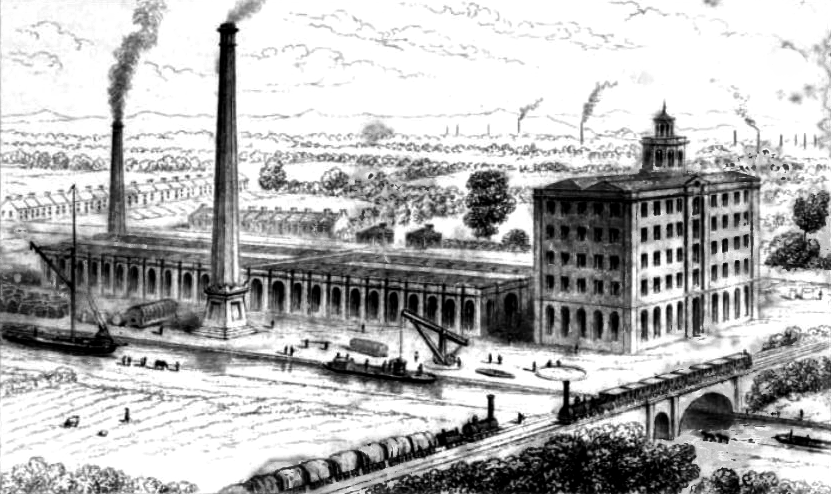
Bridgewater Foundry at Patricroft, 1839

=== Manchester to Runcorn extension ===
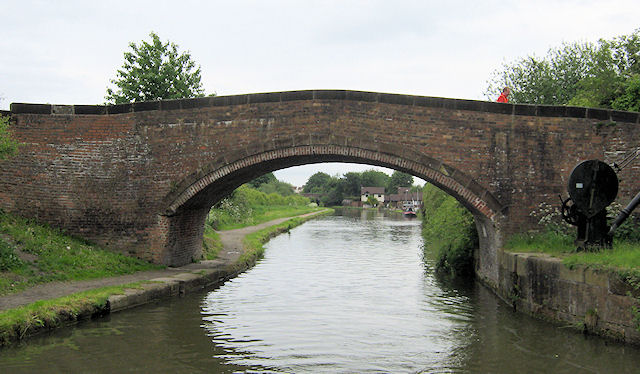
Borrow's Bridge across the Runcorn extension of the Bridgewater Canal

Bridgewater Canal Extension Act 1762
- Act of Parliament
- Parliament of Great Britain
- Long title: An Act to enable the most Noble Francis Duke of Bridgewater to make a Navigable Cut, or Canal, from Longford Bridge in the Township of Stretford in the County Palatine of Lancaster, to the River Mersey, at a Place called The Hemp Stones in the Township of Halton in the County of Chester.
- Citation: 2 Geo. 3. c. 11 Pr.
- Territorial extent: Great Britain

Dates
- Royal assent: 24 March 1762
- Commencement: 3 November 1761
Other legislation
Relates to	Bridgewater Canal Act 1758; Bridgewater Canal Act 1759; Bridgewater Canal Act 1766; Bridgwater Canal Act 1795

Status: Current legislation

In September 1761, with his assistant Hugh Oldham, Brindley surveyed an extension from Longford Bridge to Hempstones, near Halton, Cheshire. He assisted in obtaining parliamentary approval for the Bridgewater Canal Extension Act 1762 (2 Geo. 3. c. 11 Pr.) which allowed the construction of an extension to the canal, from Manchester, to the River Mersey at Runcorn. Despite objections from the Mersey and Irwell Navigation Company, Royal assent was given on 24 March 1762. A junction, Waters Meeting, was created in Trafford Park, at which the new extension branched south through Stretford, Sale, Altrincham, Lymm and finally to Runcorn.

In December 1761 Brindley undertook a survey of the route at Runcorn. His initial plan was to make the terminus at Hempstones, east of Runcorn Gap, but following a study of the tides and depth of water there, he decided instead to build the terminus west of Runcorn Gap. This change was designed to accommodate Mersey flats, although the low fixed bridges required that traffic on the canal be able to lower or unship their masts. Runcorn basin was almost 90 feet (27 m) above the Mersey, so a flight of ten locks, described as "the wonder of their time", was built to connect the two. Nine locks had a fall of 2 metres (7 ft), with a fall at the river lock of more than 6 metres (20 ft) at low water. It allowed vessels to enter and leave the canal on any tide. The connection to the Mersey was made on 1 January 1773. The river's tidal action tended to deposit silt around the lower entrance to the locks, so to counteract this a channel, equipped with gates at each end and known as the Duke's Gut, was cut through the marshes upriver from the locks. At high tide the gates were closed, and with the ebb of the tide were opened to release water, which scoured the silt from the entrance to the locks. The cut created an island, known as Runcorn Island, crossed by Castle Bridge.

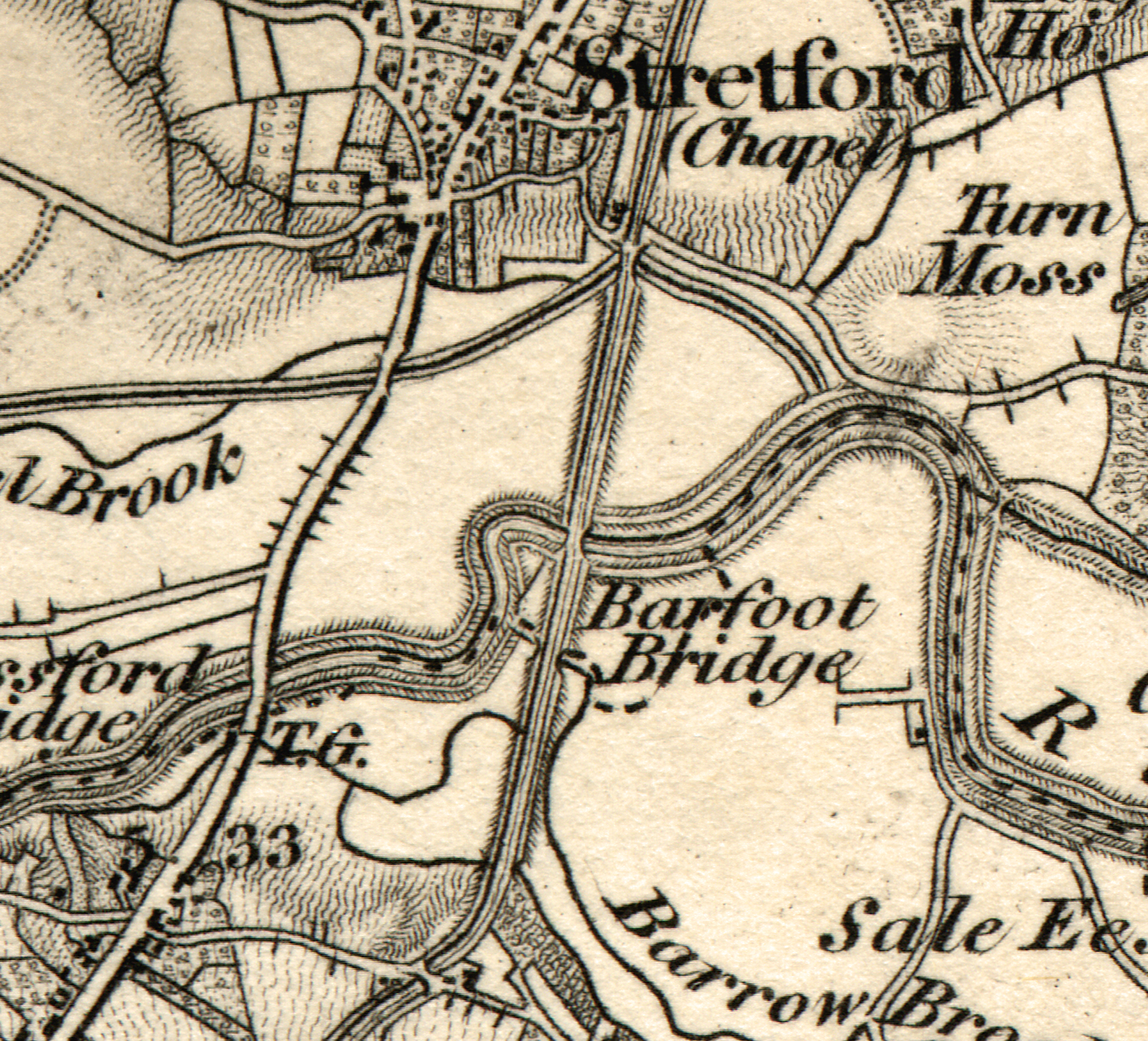
Ordnance Survey map of 1843 showing the canal crossing the River Mersey at Barfoot Bridge, Stretford

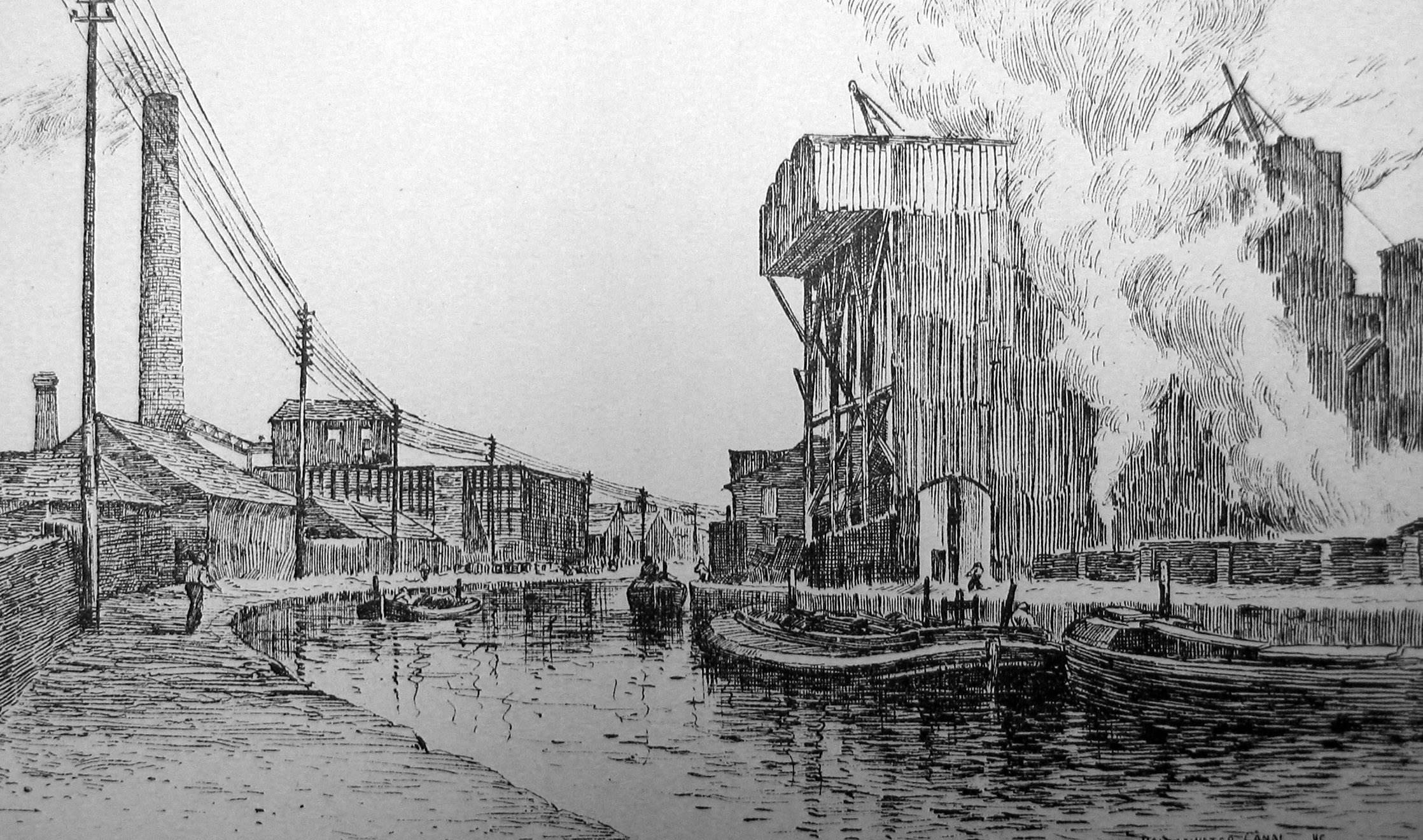
The canal at Runcorn between the factories

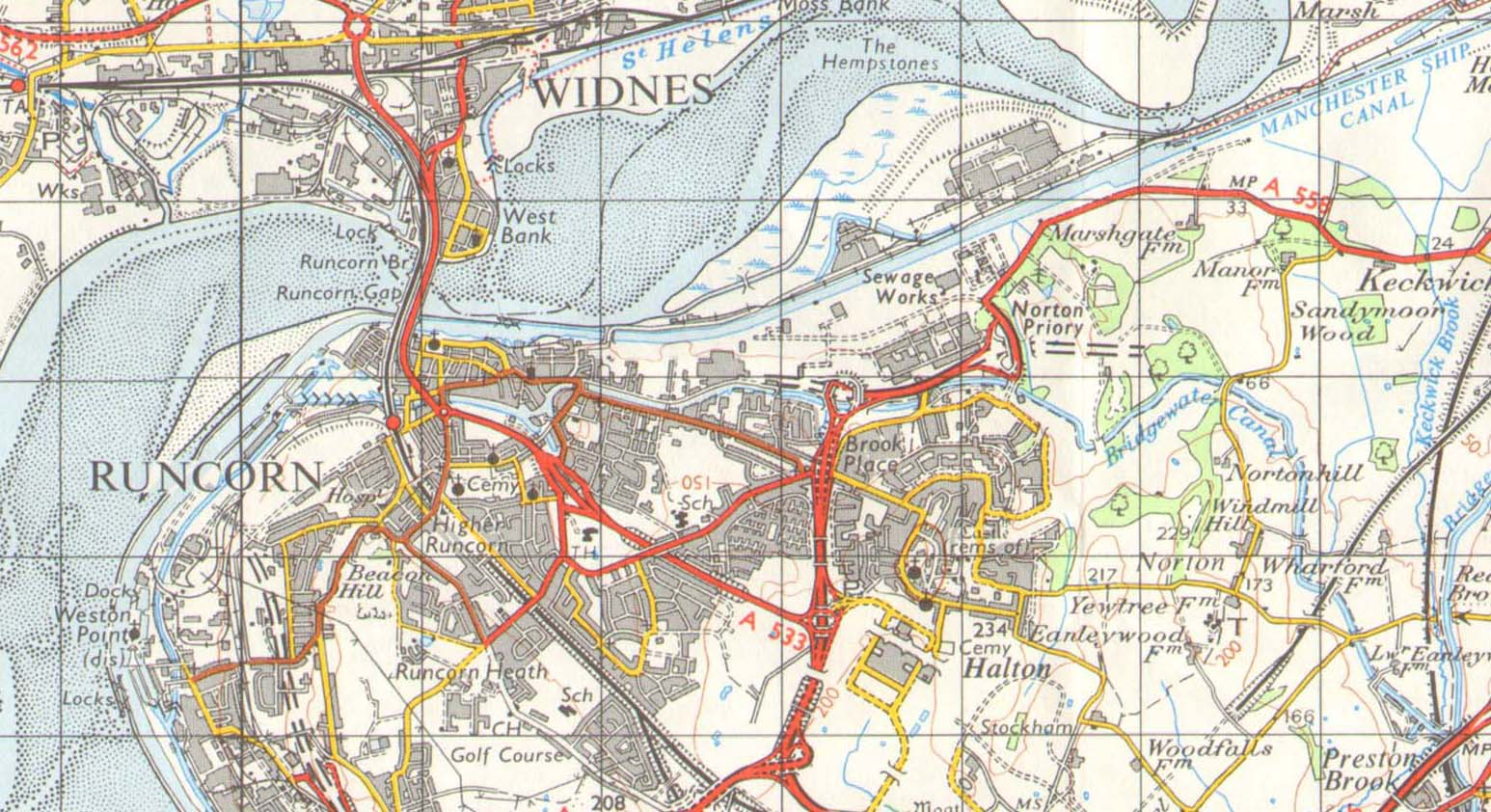
Extract from OS one-inch sheet 100 showing the junction between the Bridgewater Canal and the Manchester Ship Canal at Runcorn, with the flight of locks, as it was in 1966

The connection to Manchester was delayed by Sir Richard Brooke of Norton Priory. Concerned that boatmen might poach his game and wildfowl, Brooke did not want the canal to pass through his land. The act included several stipulations: the canal should not come within 325 metres (1,066 ft) of his house; the towpath should be on the south side of the canal, furthest away from Brooke's house; there should be no quays, buildings, hedges or fences to obstruct the view; no vessels were to be moored within 1,000 metres (3,281 ft) of the house, other than during construction. Eventually, though, a compromise was reached. This included the construction of a link to the Trent and Mersey Canal at Preston Brook (permitted by the Trent and Mersey Canal Act 1766), and the building of the canal's terminus to the west of Runcorn Gap. The Trent and Mersey link gave the Duke access to the Midlands, and forestalled the Weaver Trustees from making their own junction with the canal. The new extension also met with opposition from the Mersey and Irwell Navigation, until the duke purchased a controlling interest in the company. The first part of the new extension was opened in 1767, and completed in full by March 1776, but Brindley did not live to see its completion; it was continued by his brother-in-law, Hugh Henshall.

The total cost of the canal, from Worsley to Manchester and from Longford Bridge to the Mersey at Runcorn, was £220,000. Alongside the Mersey, the duke built Runcorn Dock, several warehouses, and Bridgewater House, a temporary home from which he could supervise operations at the Runcorn end. Two locks up from the tideway was a small dry dock.

=== Sale to Stockport branch ===
Bridgewater Canal Act 1766
- Act of Parliament
- Parliament of Great Britain
- Long title: An Act to enable the most Noble Francis Duke of Bridgewater to extend a Branch of his Navigable Cut, or Canal, upon Sale Moor in the County of Chester, to the Market Town of Stockport in the said County.
- Citation: 6 Geo. 3. c. 17 Pr.
- Territorial extent: Great Britain

Dates
- Royal assent: 18 March 1766
- Commencement: 11 November 1766
Other legislation
Relates to	Bridgewater Canal Act 1758; Bridgewater Canal Act 1759; Bridgewater Canal Extension Act 1762; Bridgwater Canal Act 1795

Status: Current legislation

In 1766 the duke gained a fourth act of Parliament, the Bridgewater Canal Act 1766 (6 Geo. 3. c. 17 Pr.) for a branch canal between Sale Moor and Stockport which was to follow the valley of the Mersey. The act was applied for to counter a proposed canal that would give the towns of Stockport and Macclesfield access to the Mersey, via the River Weaver. The work was not done, the act lapsed and this section of canal was never built.

Over two decades later, the nearby Manchester Bolton & Bury Canal had sought a connection to other waterways, and it appears that the duke had planned to limit the activities of the new company. On 15 December 1792 the duke purchased a portion of the Ringspiggot estate in Salford which blocked the MB&BC's plans to build a riverside basin and wharfs there.

=== Worsley to Leigh extension ===
Bridgwater Canal Act 1795
- Act of Parliament
- Parliament of Great Britain
- Long title: An Act to enable the Most Noble Francis Duke of Bridgewater to make a Navigable Cut from his present Navigation in the Township of Worsley in the County Palatine of Lancaster, to the Township of Pennington near the Town of Leigh in the said County.
- Citation: 35 Geo. 3. c. 44
- Territorial extent: Great Britain

Dates
- Royal assent: 28 April 1795
- Commencement: 30 December 1794
Other legislation
Relates to	Bridgewater Canal Act 1758; Bridgewater Canal Act 1759; Bridgewater Canal Extension Act 1762; Bridgwater Canal Act 1766

Status: Current legislation

Text of statute as originally enacted

In 1795 the duke secured a fifth act, the Bridgwater Canal Act 1795 (35 Geo. 3. c. 44), which enabled him to extend the canal a further 5 miles (8 km) from Worsley via Boothstown, Astley Green and Bedford to Leigh. The new extension enabled the supply to Manchester of coal from Leigh and the surrounding districts. On 21 June 1819 the Leeds and Liverpool Canal Branch and Railway Act 1819 (59 Geo. 3. c. cv) was enacted to create a link between this extension and the Leeds and Liverpool Canal at Wigan.

Access to the canal brought about a rapid development in coal mining on the Manchester Coalfield west of Worsley. Chaddock pits in the east of Tyldesley were connected to an underground level from Worsley. In 1820, to ease congestion at the Delph in Worsley, Chaddock Pit was connected to the canal at Boothstown basin by an underground canal, the Chaddock Level which ran in a north west direction from the canal at Boothstown to the pit. Sometime after 1840 Samuel Jackson built a narrow gauge tramroad worked by horses from his Gin Pit Colliery to Marsland Green where he installed cranes and tipplers to load barges at a wharf. The tramroad was later worked by locomotives. In 1867 the Fletchers built a private railway line and the Bedford Basin with facilities for loading coal from Howe Bridge onto barges. Astley Green Colliery began winding coal on the north bank of the canal in 1912. In the 1940s and '50s coal was sent to Barton Power Station and Runcorn Gas Works.

=== Connection to Rochdale Canal ===
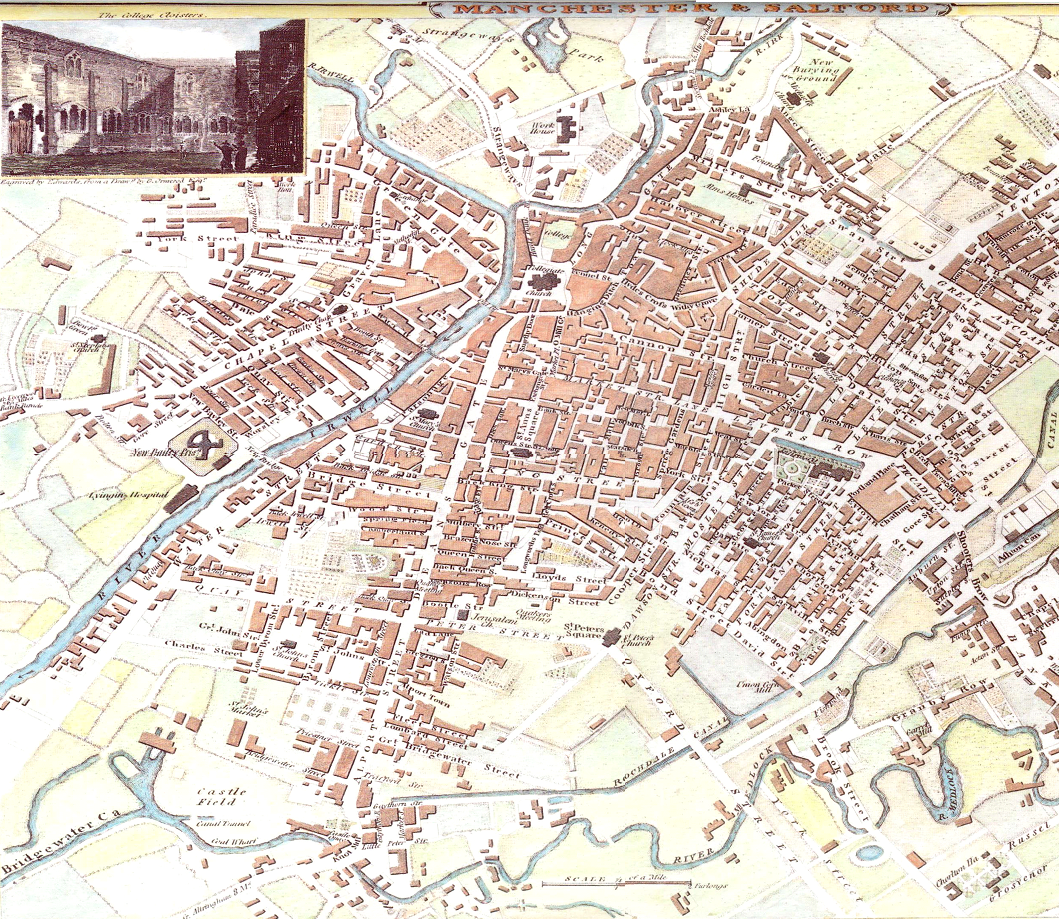
A map from 1801 showing the Bridgewater and Rochdale canals yet to be connected

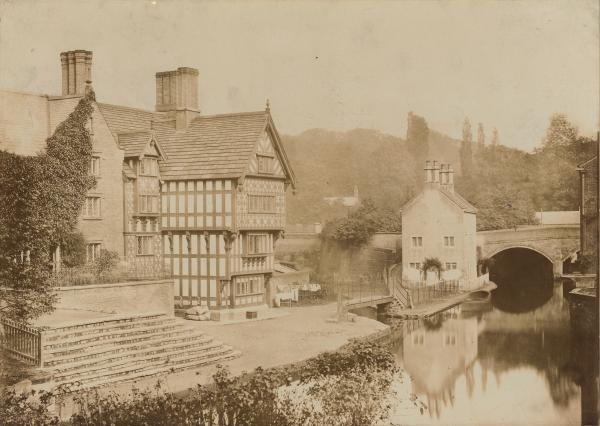
The Packet House at Worsley, in 1866

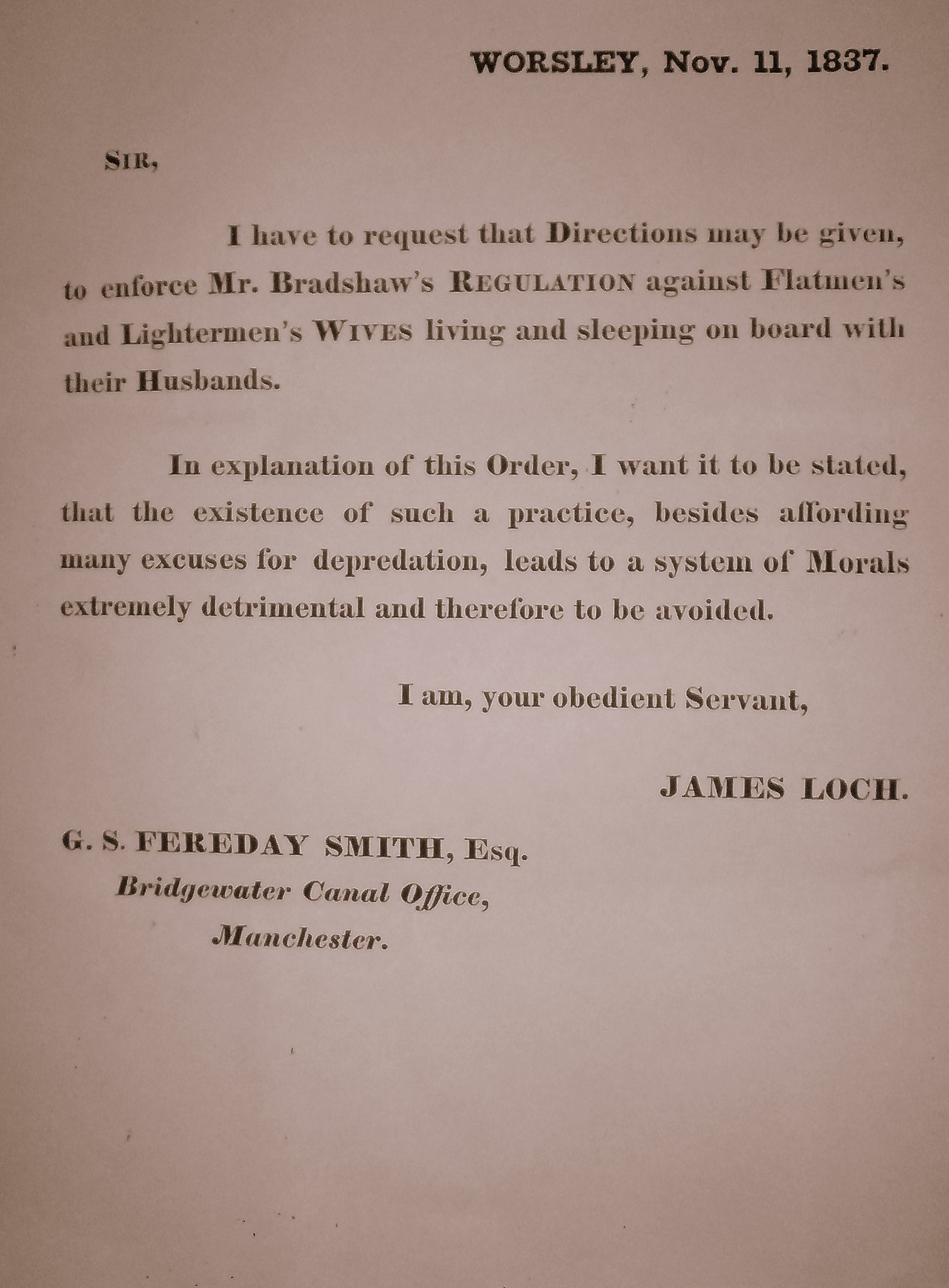
Letter to the Bridgewater Canal offices concerning wives sleeping on boats, dated 11 November 1837

Upon completion of the Rochdale Canal in 1804, the two canals were joined at Castlefield. This connection may have been a factor in the failure of the Manchester Bolton & Bury Canal Company's rival scheme to build a canal between Bury and Sladen. The River Medlock, a major source of water for the canal and which was almost as badly polluted as the nearby Irwell, was diverted through a tunnel under the canal at Castlefield by Charles Edward Cawley, a civil engineer for the Salford Corporation and later a Member of Parliament (MP) for Salford. The canal was from that point supplied by the much purer water of the Rochdale Canal.

=== Mines ===
Worsley Delph, in Worsley, originally a centuries-old sandstone quarry near Worsley Brook, was the entrance to the Navigable Levels. It is now a scheduled monument. Two entrances, built years apart, allow access to the specially built M-boats (also known as Starvationers), the largest of which could carry 12 long tons (12 t) of coal. Inside the mines 46 miles (74 km) of underground canal on four levels, linked by inclined planes, were constructed. The mines ceased production in 1887. As the canal passes through Worsley, iron oxide from the mines has, for many years, stained the water bright orange. The removal of this colouration is currently the subject of a £2.5 million remedial scheme.

=== Traffic ===
In 1791 the mines at Worsley produced 100,282 long tons (101,891 t) of coal, 60,461 long tons (61,431 t) of which were "sold down the navigation"; 12,000 long tons (12,000 t) of rocksalt was also transported from Cheshire. Sales of coal were £19,455, and nearly £30,000 was earned from other cargoes. Passenger traffic in 1791 brought in receipts of £3,781.

The canal also carried passengers and was in keen competition with the Mersey and Irwell Navigation Company (M&IN). The journey down river by the latter route took eight hours (nine hours in the up direction) while the journey on the Bridgewater Canal took nine hours each way. Fares were similar but the Bridgewater route was said to be "more picturesque". Boating men also used the canal. They lifted their small lightweight boats out of the M&IN at Runcorn, and carried them a short distance up the steep streets onto the Bridgewater Canal.

Barges on the canal continued to be towed by horses until the middle of the 19th century, when they were replaced by steam-powered boats after a fatal epidemic spread through the horse population. The "dense smoke" produced by the steam barges and their "harsh unnecessary whistling" proved unpopular with some local residents, who also began to suffer from a condition known as canal throat, "no doubt caused by the foul emanations given off by its [the Bridgewater Canal's] horribly filthy water".

The canal carried commercial freight traffic until 1975; the last regular cargo was grain from Liverpool to Manchester for BOCM. It is now used mainly by pleasure craft and hosts two rowing clubs – Trafford Rowing Club and Manchester University Boat Club.

== Bridgewater Trustees ==
The Duke of Bridgewater died on 8 March 1803. By his will the income from the canal was to be paid to his nephew George Leveson-Gower, the Marquess of Stafford (later the 1st Duke of Sutherland). On his death it was to go to Stafford's second son Francis, provided he changed his name to Egerton; and then to his heirs and successors. The management of the company was placed in the hands of three trustees. These were Sir Archibald Macdonald, who was Lord Chief Baron of the Exchequer, Edward Venables-Vernon-Harcourt, at the time the Bishop of Carlisle and later the Archbishop of York, and, as Superintendent, Robert Haldane Bradshaw, the Duke's agent. Bradshaw managed the estate, for which he received a salary of £2,000 a year and the use of the duke's mansions at Worsley and Runcorn. The other two trustees had each married nieces of the duke and were "dummy trustees".

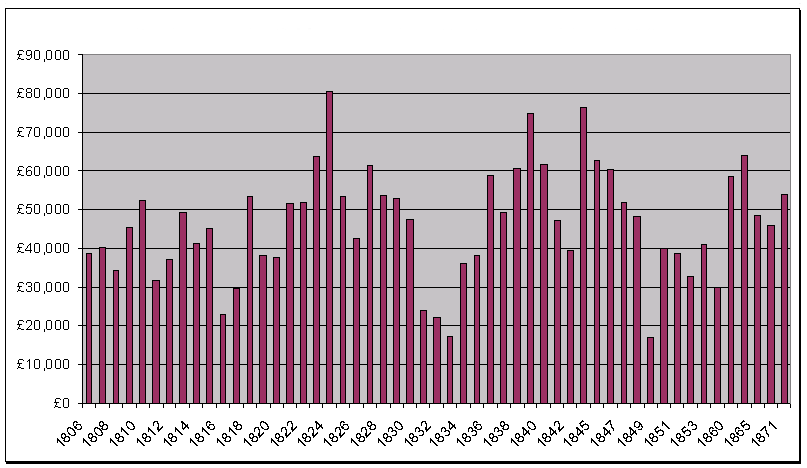
Value of trade carried on the Bridgewater Canal 1806–71

During the time the canal was administered by the Bridgewater Trustees, it made a profit every year. Until his retirement in 1834, the administration was carried out entirely by Bradshaw. It has been calculated that the average annual profit between 1806 and 1826 was of the order of 13 per cent, and in 1824, the best year, it was 23 per cent. Bradshaw found it difficult to delegate, and complained of being over-worked, but he was also regarded as being a "formidable bargainer". In 1805 he was approached by the proprietors of the nearby Manchester Bolton & Bury Canal to resolve a dispute with a Salford landowner, but his response was delayed. In 1810 there was a general agreement with the Mersey and Irwell Navigation Company (M&IN) to simultaneously raise freight charges. However any cooperation between the two companies was short-lived and by 1812 the Mersey and Irwell had reduced their charges. Further competition was to come from other carriers who used the canal; in 1824 the traffic carried by private companies exceeded that carried by the Trustees for the first time. However, in time more profit came from "tonnage traffic" (that carried by private companies) than from the Bridgewater's own carriage of freight. Bradshaw's administration saw increased deterioration of the fabric of the canal, the locks, docks and warehouses. The undertakings were starved of capital largely owing to inadequate provision for it in the duke's will. There were also problems caused by silting around the entrance to the Mersey and by the changing channels of the river itself.

During the 1820s there was increased dissatisfaction with the canals. They did not cope well with increasing volumes of cargo, and they were perceived as monopolistic, and the preserve of the landed gentry class. There was increased interest in the possibility of railway construction. The possible construction of a railway between Liverpool and Manchester was vigorously opposed by Bradshaw, who refused railway surveyors access to land owned by the trustees. When the first bill was presented to Parliament in 1825, the trustees opposed and it was overthrown. However, later in the year Lord Stafford, possibly persuaded to do so by William Huskisson, invested £100,000 (one-fifth of the required capital), in the Liverpool and Manchester Railway. Following this the trustees withdrew their opposition to the construction of the railway; they did not petition against the second bill, which was passed in 1826. At the same time as he made his investment in the railway, Lord Stafford advanced £40,000 for improvements to the canal. This was spent mainly on a second line of locks at Runcorn, which were completed in 1828, plus new warehouses at Manchester and Liverpool. The additional line of locks cost £35,000 and was used for traffic heading to Manchester, while the old line was used for traffic passing down to the Mersey.

In 1830 the new railway opened and by the end of the year was carrying freight. Bradshaw immediately went into competition by lowering the rates of carriage on the canal and by offering improved terms to the private carriers. By so doing he managed to maintain the volume of traffic carried by the canal, both freight and passengers, at a time when the country was suffering a trade depression. However Bradshaw's tactics led to a sharp decline in profits. At the same time costs were rising, partly due to the use of steamboats on the Mersey. Further competition came with the opening of the Macclesfield Canal in 1831 which gave separate access to Manchester from the Midlands. In November 1831 Bradshaw suffered a stroke, as a result of which he lost the use of his left arm and leg, and there is evidence that it also impaired his judgement.

Matters came to a head in 1833, the year in which the canal made its lowest profit since the death of the Duke. On 19 July the Marquess of Stafford (now the 1st Duke of Sutherland) died and the profits from the canal passed to Francis Egerton. On 25 September Bradshaw's son, Captain James Bradshaw, who had been acting as a deputy superintendent to the trustees, and who had been expected to succeed his father as superintendent, committed suicide. The agent for both Francis Egerton and his older brother, who was now the 2nd Duke of Sutherland, was James Loch. The events that followed were "stage-managed by Loch". He reported to Francis Egerton that Bradshaw was no longer fit to be superintendent, and then persuaded Bradshaw to retire on his full salary. It had been expected that he would appoint his other son, William Rigby Bradshaw, as his successor, but Loch persuaded him to appoint James Sothern in the position; Sothern had been the principal agent of the trust since December 1832. He took over the position of superintendent on 3 February 1834. The appointment of Sothern was not a success. Charges were made against him of dishonesty and of nepotism. He entered into disputes and disagreements with Loch, with Francis Egerton, and with the other two trustees. (Sir Archibald Macdonald had died in 1826; by this time his place had been taken by the 10th Earl of Devon). To avoid a costly lawsuit, at the end of 1836 Sothern agreed to retire on various conditions which included receipt of £45,000. On 1 March 1837, he was succeeded as superintendent by James Loch.

Loch was extremely busy and did not have time to deal with the detailed administration of the Trust. He therefore looked for a deputy to take on these duties. His first choice was Richard Smith who was the mine agent to the Trustees of the 1st Earl of Dudley. However this was perceived as poaching and it led to such controversy that Smith declined the offer and recommended his son, George Samuel Fereday Smith for the post. Fereday Smith was appointed as Deputy Superintendent in March 1837 on a salary of £600 a year, half of the salary which had been offered to his father. Loch immediately undertook a reorganisation of the administration and efficiency of the business, restored the agreement with the Old Quay Company to raise freight charges, and improved the facilities for passengers, including the introduction of "swift boats". By 1837, the trustees employed around 3,000 people (including those working in the colliery and in Worsley Yard), making it one of the largest employers in the country at the time. Since the death of the Duke the amount of freight carried by the canal had almost trebled; in 1803 it carried 334,495 long tons (339,863 t) of goods and in 1836 968,795 long tons (984,341 t).

In 1843 a new dock, the Francis Dock, was opened at Runcorn. The late 1830s and early 1840s had seen increased competition between the Bridgewater Canal on the one hand, and other canal companies and the railways on the other. The most dangerous of the rivals was the Mersey and Irwell Navigation Company who started to reduce their rates again in 1840. This led to a price war between the two canal companies and the Liverpool and Manchester Railway, who had previously cooperated on rates. Eventually, in desperation, the Bridgewater Trustees bought the Mersey and Irwell and took over its ownership on 1 January 1844. During the same year competition with other canals was further reduced by agreements made with the Ellesmere and Chester Canal Company and with the Anderton Carrying Company. In 1844 the canal made a profit of £76,410, the second highest during the time it was administered by the Trustees.

Having seen off competition from other canal companies, the next major threat was to come from the railways. This was the period in the mid-1840s known as the Railway Mania. The railways competed with the canals in three ways; by building, or threatening to build, new lines which would be in direct competition with the canals; by amalgamation into giant companies (such as the Midland and the London and North Western companies), which gave them more political power; and by taking over ownership of canal companies. On 13 April 1844 The Times newspaper reported that the canal was to be emptied of water, and converted into a railway, although nothing came of this scheme. In 1845, in return for concessions, the trustees supported the Grand Junction Railway in its campaign to build a more direct line to Liverpool, which crossed the Mersey over a bridge at Runcorn Gap. However the bill was overthrown in the House of Lords. Competition from the railways and other canals led to a decline in the trading and the profits between 1845 and 1848, but there was no "disastrous collapse". During this time the Trustees and their representatives were engaged in vigorous campaigns in Parliament to protect their interests.

By October 1844 a bonding warehouse had been built in Manchester and the first cargo to arrive was announced in a letter to the Manchester Guardian, later printed in The Times:

FIRST ARRIVAL IN THE PORT OF MANCHESTER OF A CARGO OF GOODS FOR BOND

We have great pleasure in recording the first arrival in the Port of Manchester of a vessel, with an entire cargo of wines and spirits removed in bond, and for bonding in Manchester. The vessel, a flat named the Express, was wholly laden with a valuable cargo of wines and spirits, in all about 40 tons weight, belonging to Mr. William Gibb, spirit merchant, of this town, whose active and long-continued exertions in the struggle to obtain the privilege of bonding for this great and important borough are about to be acknowledged in the form of a substantial mark of respect and gratitude by his fellow-townsmen. The Express arrived from Liverpool on Saturday evening; but it was yesterday morning before she began to unload. She is lying in the Bridgewater Canal, Knott Mill where the Duke's trustees have constructed a large bonding vault, which Mr. Gibb has taken and had licensed for the purpose, and we believe he is now removing his stock of wine and spirits from other ports to Manchester, for the greater convenience of sampling and sale. The lockers, gaugers, and other officers of Customs were in attendance, superintending the unloading of the vessel and thus have commenced the operations of the Manchester Custom-house. It is a gratifying circumstance that a gentleman who took so prominent a part in the struggle to obtain the boon of bonding for Manchester should be the first to enjoy the fruits of its success. We hope ere long to record the general operation of the system; though it will require a little time, perhaps, as it must have a beginning.

— Manchester Guardian

However, this venture was less successful than expected, as is evidenced by a letter to The Observer later that year, also printed in The Times:

MANCHESTER A BONDING PORT

After the pressing demands which have been made by some of our principal manufacturing towns for the privileges of inland bonded warehouses for goods subject to Customs duties, it would naturally be supposed that the formation of a Custom-house establishment at Manchester would have occasioned a vast quantity of business in that extensive seat of British manufacturers; but we are informed that the result is very different from what had been expected. Although the system has been introduced into Manchester only as an experiment and a large establishment has been formed entirely of old and experienced officers; under the impression that the extent of business there would require the constant services of well tried men, we believe that, up to the present period, little trade has passed through the Manchester Custom-house and the officers' duties are nearly approaching to a sinecure. The total annual expense of this establishment, exclusive of that for the Custom-house and warehouse is £2,620. The town council of the borough of Manchester, however, are made liable, under the act of the 7th and 8th of Victoria cap 81, to the charges of maintaining this establishment, and the public are thereby exonerated from the expense.

— Observer

Between 1849 and 1851 the competition between the Trustees and the railway companies intensified. Agreements and alliances were made and broken. Their major opponents were the London and North Western Railway and the Lancashire and Yorkshire Railway who reduced tariffs and took business away from the canals. For the first time the railways carried more trade between Liverpool and the towns of central Lancashire than the canals. The value of the traffic carried by the Bridgewater Canal in 1851 was the lowest in the time it was administered by the Trustees. In 1851 the Earl of Ellesmere hosted a visit to Manchester by Queen Victoria and Prince Albert. They stayed at Worsley Hall, with a view of the canal, and were given a trip between Patricroft railway station and Worsley Hall, on state barges. Large crowds had gathered to cheer the royal party, which apparently frightened the horses drawing the barge so much that they fell into the canal.

The Trustees spent much time between 1851 and 1855 in negotiations to ease the competition, especially that from the London and North Western Railway. The most likely allies seemed to be other railway companies, including the Shrewsbury and Birmingham and the Shrewsbury and Chester railway companies, and the Great Western Railway. Of these, the most likely seemed to be the Great Western Railway who, in their concern to expand northwards were willing to help the Trustees with the carriage of their traffic to the south. However years of negotiations came to no agreement and, in the end, the Trustees' railway deal was done with the London and North Western Railway, who agreed to cooperate with the onward passage of the Trustees' traffic.

On 28 June 1855 James Loch, the Superintendent, died and was succeeded by Hon. Algernon Fulke Egerton, Lord Ellesmere's third son. He was then aged 29, and had been educated at Harrow and Christ Church, Oxford; he had been destined for a political life and had no experience of managing coal mines or canals. Since James Loch had been appointed, he had been mainly in control of the management of the Trustees, assisted by his son George Loch. During this time the role of Fereday Smith had been diminished; initially appointed as Deputy Superintendent, his position was reduced to that of Principal Agent in 1845. With the arrival of the inexperienced Algernon Egerton, Fereday Smith had a much greater say in the management. During the previous four years the Lochs had been reluctant to invest in improvements to the canal or Runcorn Dock, despite the increasing demand for the passage of goods through the dock, and the profits made during these years became stagnant. Fereday Smith had been keen on expansion and now his opportunity came. He first reduced the top-heavy administration of the Trust, and then took on the planning of the expansion of the business. The steamers owned by the Trustees had been neglected and were in a poor state; these were repaired or sold.

George Loch, who had been opposed to using the Trustees' investments for improvements to the canals or docks, died in 1857. Between 1857 and 1872 the Trustees provided more capital for improvements from their own resources than at any previous time. The Runcorn and Weston Canal was built in 1858–59, providing a connection between Runcorn Docks and the Weaver Navigation. A new half tide dock, the Alfred Dock was opened at Runcorn in 1860. Electric telegraph was installed in 1861–62.

In 1862 the 2nd Earl of Ellesmere died and his son and heir, the 3rd Earl was a minor, aged 15. This gave Algernon Egerton even more power to invest the profits of the company in developments. Negotiations were made to increase sea-borne trade, both British and foreign, through the canal. Building started on a new dock at Runcorn in 1867. Work was carried out in the Mersey estuary around the docks to improve access for vessels. Some of this was carried out in conjunction with the London and North Western Railway who were building a bridge across Runcorn Gap to take their line from Weaver Junction to Liverpool; the railway paid half the cost of the improvements, amounting to about £20,000 (£1.94 million today). Improvements were made to the Trustees' facilities at Liverpool, to the Mersey and Irwell Navigation and to the Bridgewater Canal itself. Agreements were made with the railway companies to cooperate on the transit of goods and the rates of carriage and "the Trustees' fortunes entered a calmer phase".

== Subsequent owners ==
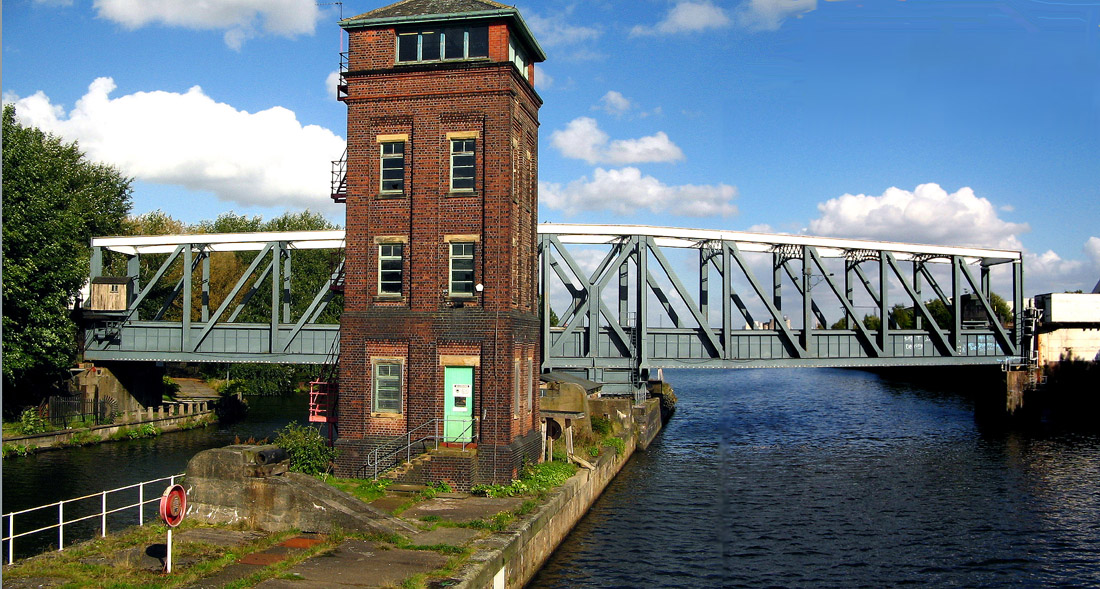
Barton Swing Aqueduct, built to replace the original aqueduct during construction of the Manchester Ship Canal

Manchester Ship Canal (Bridgewater Canal) Act 1907
- Act of Parliament
- Parliament of the United Kingdom
- Long title: An Act to authorise the working of mines minerals under and adjacent to the portion of the Bridgewater Canal extending from Monton Bridge, in the County of Lancaster, to Leigh, in the same county, and for other purposes.
- Citation: 7 Edw. 7. c. xv

Dates
- Royal assent: 4 July 1907
Other legislation
Amended by	Manchester Ship Canal (Bridgewater Canal) Act 1907 (Amendment) Order 1996 (SI 1996/1484)

Status: Amended

Manchester Ship Canal (Bridgewater Canal) Act 1907 (Amendment) Order 1996
- Statutory Instrument
- Parliament of the United Kingdom
- Citation: SI 1996/1484

Dates
- Made: 6 June 1996
- Laid before Parliament: 7 June 1996
- Commencement: 30 June 1996
Other legislation
Amends	Manchester Ship Canal (Bridgewater Canal) Act 1907
Made under	Coal Industry Act 1994

Text of statute as originally enacted

In 1872 the Bridgewater Navigation Company Ltd was formed, and on Monday 9 September the canal was purchased in the names of Sir Edward William Watkin and William Philip Price, respectively chairmen of the Manchester, Sheffield and Lincolnshire Railway and the Midland Railway for £1,120,000. The canal was sold again in 1885, when the Manchester Ship Canal Company paid the Bridgewater Navigation Company £1,710,000 for all their property. The construction of the ship canal forced the removal of Barton Aqueduct and the construction of Barton Swing Aqueduct, as the former was too low for the vessels which would use the new canal. In 1907 the Manchester Ship Canal (Bridgewater Canal) Act 1907 (7 Edw. 7. c. xv) was passed, permitting coal mining near the canal between Monton Bridge and Leigh, in exchange for which the mine owners were obliged to pay the associated costs of keeping the canal open and navigable.

In 1923 Bridgewater Estates Ltd was formed to acquire the Ellesmere family estate in Worsley. In 1984 Bridgewater Estates Ltd was purchased by a subsidiary of Peel Holdings. In 1987 Highams acquired a majority shareholding of the Manchester Ship Canal Company (subsequently the shares held by Highams were transferred to Peel Holdings). In 1994 the Manchester Ship Canal Company became a wholly owned subsidiary of the Peel Holdings group. In 2004 ownership of the Manchester Ship Canal Company was transferred to the Peel Ports group.

== Current status ==
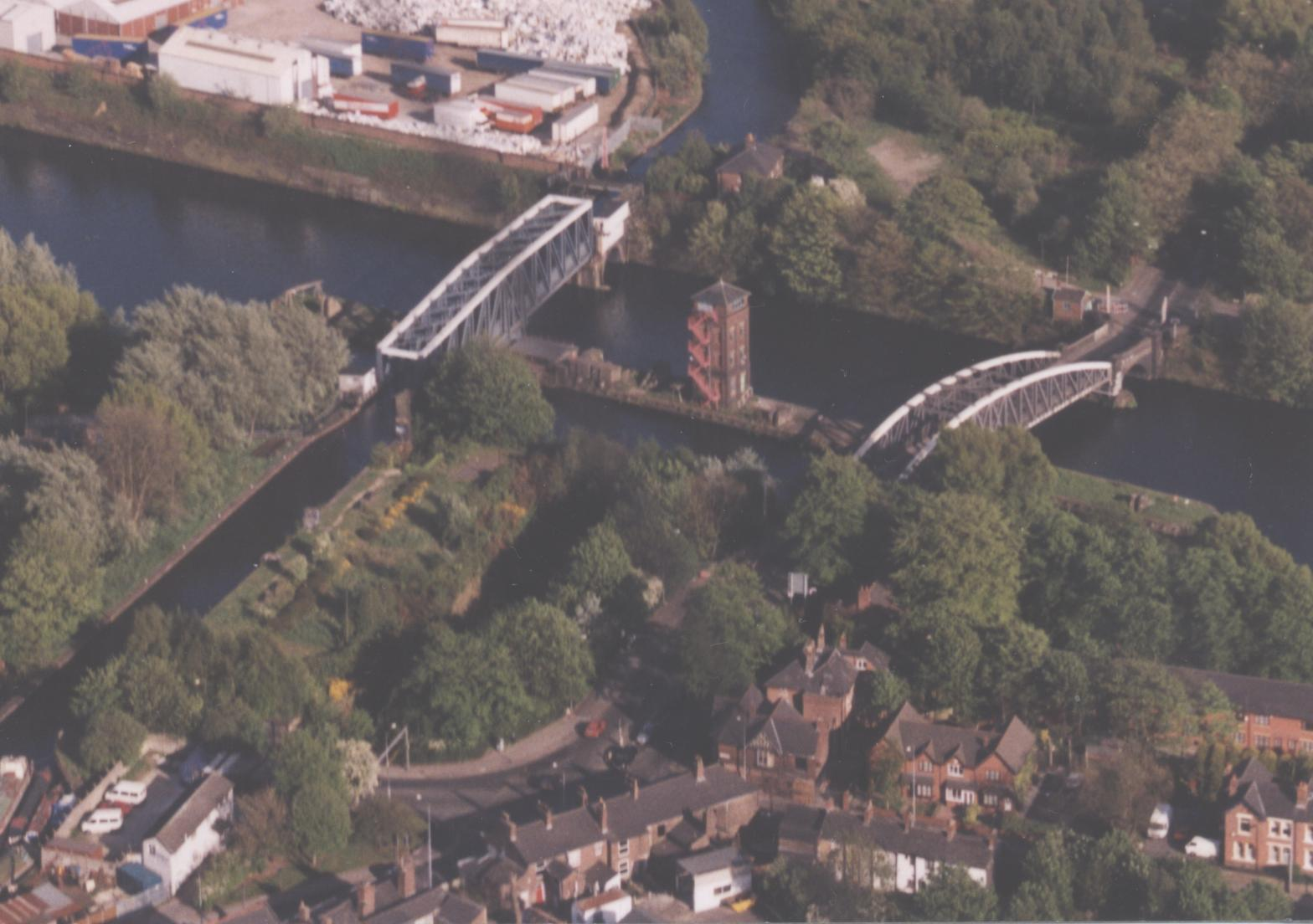
Aerial view of Barton-on-Irwell in 2002 looking SE showing the Barton Swing Aqueduct over the ship canal (left) and the Barton Road Swing Bridge (right)

Bridgewater is described as the first great achievement of the canal age. It captured the public imagination because of its engineering feats, including the aqueduct over the River Irwell and the tunnel at Worsley, but the first canal to be open to traffic was the Sankey Canal. Bridgewater now terminates in Runcorn basin, just before the disused flight of 10 locks which (before the approach road to the Silver Jubilee Bridge was built) used to lower the canal to the Runcorn Docks on the River Mersey and later, to the Manchester Ship Canal. The old line of locks in Runcorn fell into disuse in the late 1930s, and were closed under the Manchester Ship Canal Act 1949 (12, 13 & 14 Geo. 6. c. xxxvi), and filled in. The Manchester Ship Canal Act 1966 (c. xxvii) allowed the closure and filling in of the newer line of locks. The duke's warehouse in Manchester was demolished in 1960.

The canal has suffered four breaches: one soon after opening, another in 1971 near the River Bollin aqueduct, another in 2005 when a sluice gate failed in Manchester, and another near the River Bollin aqueduct, overnight on New Year's Eve 2024. Cranes are located at intervals along the canal's length to allow boards to be dropped into slots in the banks. These allow sections of the canal to be isolated in the event of a leak. The navigation is currently closed at Dunham as a result of the 2024 breach.

The canal now forms an integral part of the Cheshire Ring network of canals. Pleasure craft have been allowed on the canal since 1952.

The construction of the Mersey Gateway Bridge may allow a realignment of the bridge approach road and the restoration of the original flight of locks – thus re-opening the link to Runcorn Docks, the Runcorn and Weston Canal, the River Mersey, the Manchester Ship Canal, and the River Weaver. This would create a new ring route for leisure boats involving the Trent and Mersey Canal, the Anderton Boat Lift and the River Weaver.

The Hulme Locks Branch Canal in Manchester is now disused, and on 26 May 1995 was replaced by the nearby Pomona Lock.

=== Map ===
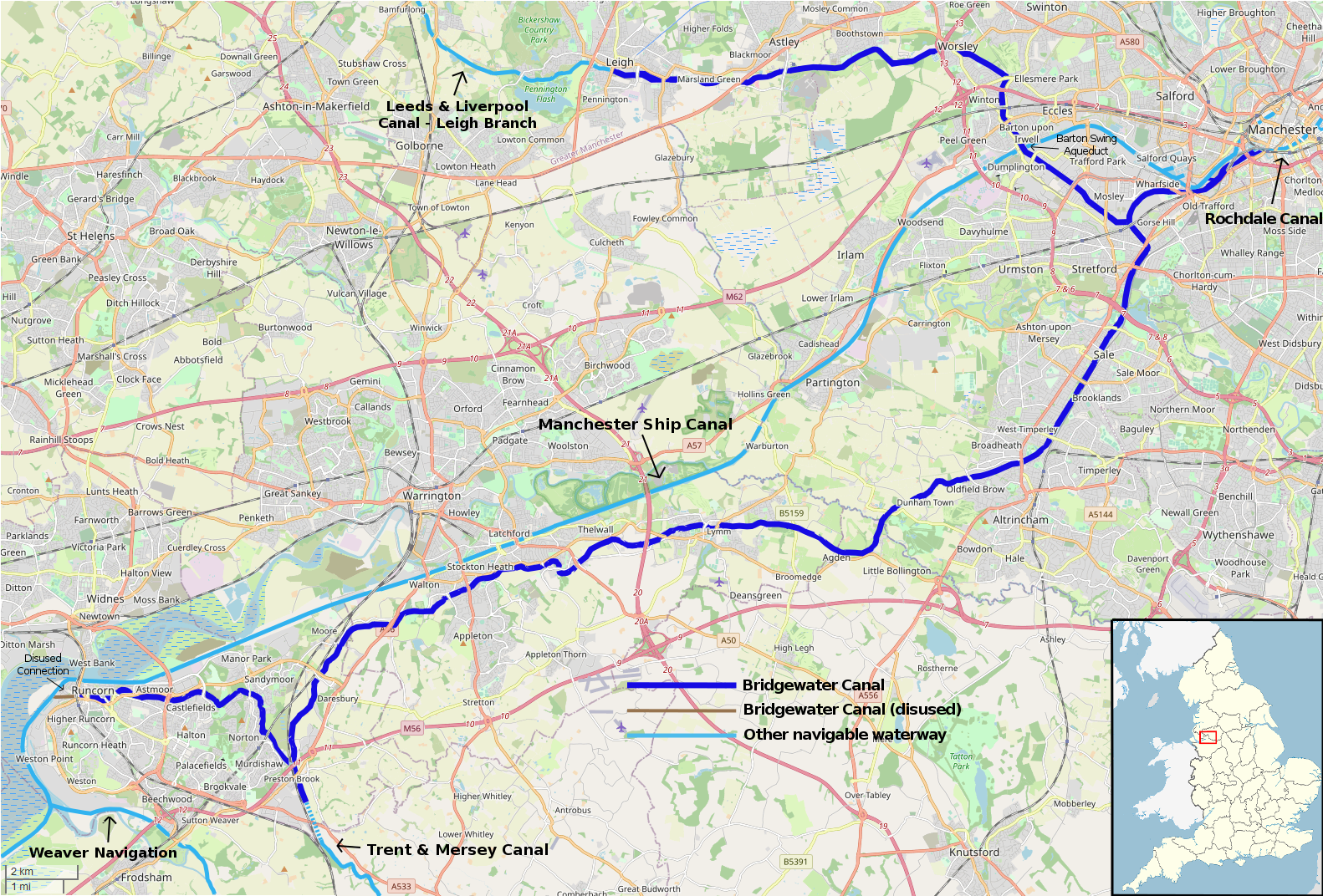
Map of the Bridgewater Canal and connecting waterways (zoom in for detail)

=== Bridgewater Way ===
The Bridgewater Way is a scheme to redevelop the canal and make it more accessible to users, particularly cyclists. The 40-mile (64 km) development, which includes a new towpath, will form part of the National Cycle and Footpath Network as Regional Route number 82.

== See also ==
- Canals of the United Kingdom
- History of the British canal system

== Bibliography ==
- Reader's Digest Library of Modern Knowledge, Reader's Digest, 1978
- The Bridgewater Canal Handbook, Ed. J. Burrow & Co.

Although no details of author and date are given, this is likely to be a reliable source as it was published for the Manchester Ship Canal Company in 1973 or later (a picture of the reopening of the canal is on the cover).

- Aspin, Chris (1995), The First industrial Society: Lancashire 1750–1850, Carnegie Publishing, ISBN 1-85936-016-5
- Chaloner, William Henry (1963), People and Industries, Routledge, ISBN 0-7146-1284-7
- Collins, Arthur (1812), Collins's peerage of England; genealogical, biographical, and historical, F. C. and J. Rivington, Otridge and Son
- Deane, Phyllis (1965), The First Industrial Revolution, Cambridge University Press
- Corbett, John (1974), Pleasant Reminiscences of the Nineteenth Century and Suggestions for Improvements in the Twentieth., E. J. Morton, ISBN 0-85972-006-3
- Hayes, Geoffrey (2004), Collieries and their Railways in the Manchester Coalfields, Landmark, ISBN 1-84306-135-X
- Kindleberger, Charles Poor (1993), A Financial History of Western Europe, Oxford University Press US, ISBN 0-19-507738-5
- Mather, F. A. (1970), After the Canal Duke, Oxford University Press
- Mullineux, Frank (1959), The Duke of Bridgewater's Canal, Eccles and District History Society.
- Nickson, Charles (1887), History of Runcorn, Mackie & Co.
- Parkinson-Bailey, John (2000), Manchester: An Architectural History, Manchester University Press, ISBN 0-7190-5606-3
- Pickering, Danby (1807), The Statutes at Large: From the Magna Charta, to the End of the Eleventh Parliament of Great Britain, Anno 1761 {continued to 1807}, J Bentham
- Priestley, Joseph (1831), Historical Account of the Navigable Rivers, Canals, and Railways of Great Britain, Longman, Green
- Skempton, Sir Alec (2002), A Biographical Dictionary of Civil Engineers in Great Britain and Ireland: 1500 to 1830, Thomas Telford, ISBN 0-7277-2939-X
- Smiles, Samuel (2006), Lives of the Engineers, Read Books, ISBN 1-4067-9868-1
- Starkey, H. F. (1983), Schooner Port: Two Centuries of Upper Mersey Sail, G. W. & A. Hesketh, ISBN 0-905777-34-4
- Starkey, H. F. (1990), Old Runcorn, Halton Borough Council
- Sweeney, D. J. (1997), A Lancashire Triangle Part Two, Triangle Publishing, ISBN 0-9529333-2-2
- Timbs, John (1860), Stories of Inventors and Discoverers in Science and the Useful Arts: A Book for Old and Young, Harper & Brothers
- Tomlinson, Victor I. (1991), The Manchester Bolton And Bury Canal, The Manchester Bolton & Bury Canal Society, archived from the original on 10 October 2008
- Ware, Michael E. (1989), Britain's lost waterways, Moorland, ISBN 0-86190-327-7

=== Further reading ===
- James Brindley: An Illustrated Life of James Brindley, 1716–1772
