= Widnes Dock =

Coordinates: 53.3532°N 2.7306°W

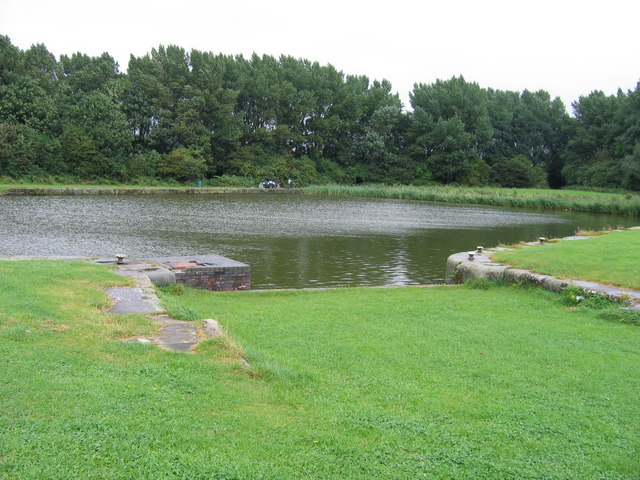
Widnes Dock with filled-in lock chamber (2007)

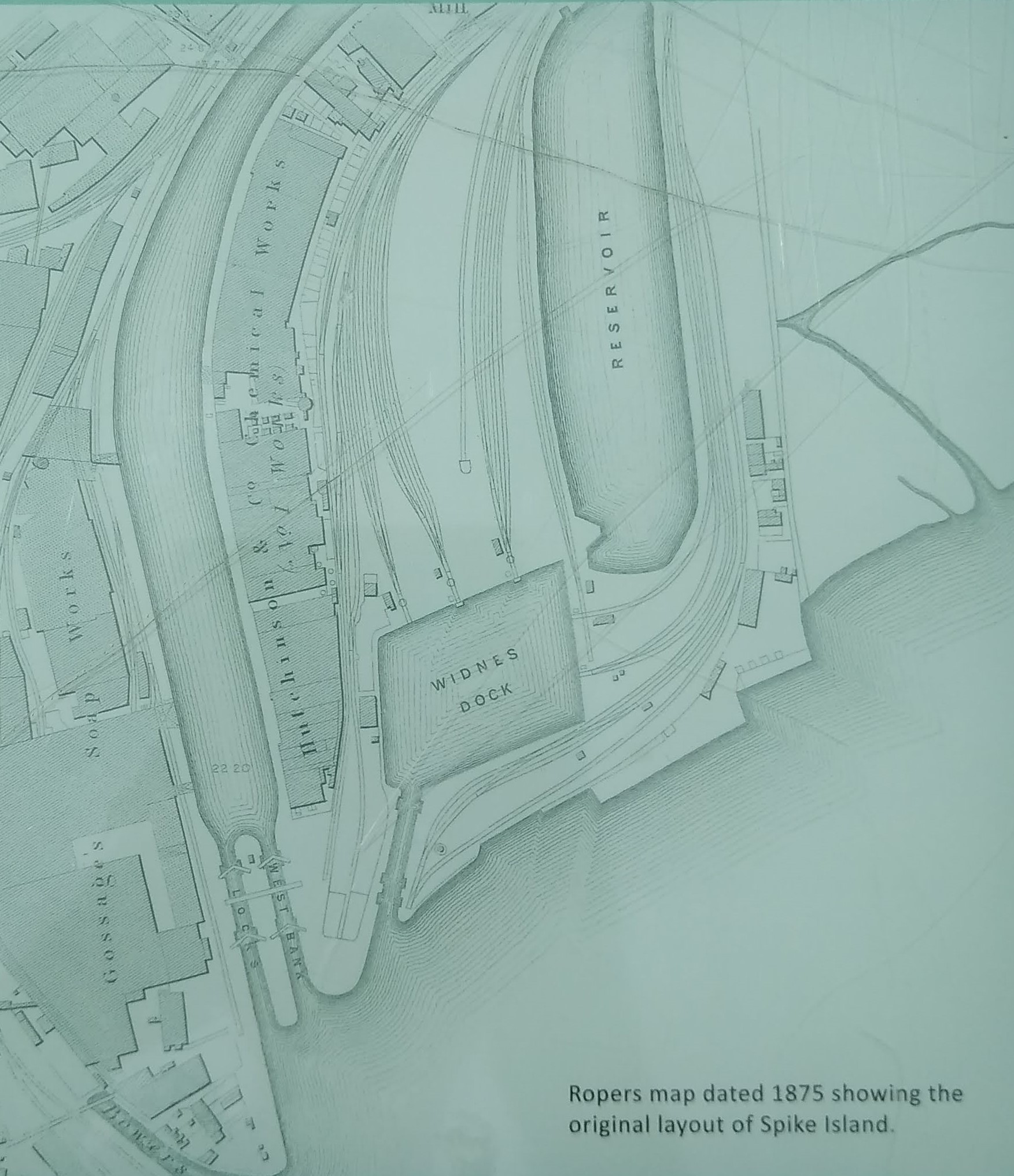
Map of Spike Island (1875) showing the location of Widnes Dock

Widnes Dock was the first rail-to-ship facility in the world. It was built in 1833 between the end of the Sankey Canal and the St Helens and Runcorn Gap Railway in Widnes.

== History ==
The remains of the dock are to be found on Spike Island. The island was at the centre of the chemical industry in the 19th century and became heavily polluted. In operation the dock was topped up by its own adjacent reservoir. The dock closed in the 1930s and it along with its lock and reservoir were filled in.

Between 1975 and 1982 the island was cleaned up. During this time part of the original dock was dug out to a depth of around 3 feet. The dock is now used for recreational purposes and fishing.

In 1864 the nearby West Bank Dock was opened and took traffic away from Widnes Dock. The West Bank Dock closed in the 1970s and site was later redeveloped into the Mersey Multimodal Gateway.
