= Runcorn and Weston Canal =

Canal in Cheshire, England

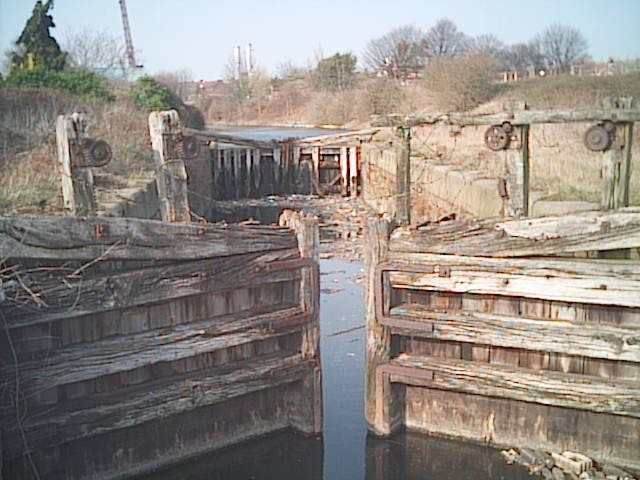
- The derelict entrance to the canal from the Weston Canal

Specifications
- Maximum boat length: 72 ft 3 in (22.02 m)
- Maximum boat beam: 18 ft 5 in (5.61 m)
- Locks: 2
- Status: Derelict, part infilled

History
- Original owner: Earl of Ellesmere
- Date of act: 1853
- Date completed: 1859
- Date closed: 1939

Geography
- Start point: Weston Docks
- End point: Runcorn Docks
- Connects to: Bridgewater Canal, Weaver Navigation

The Runcorn and Weston Canal was a short canal near Runcorn in Cheshire, England, constructed to link the Weston Canal, which is part of the River Weaver Navigation, to the Bridgewater Canal and Runcorn Docks. It was completed in 1859, but was little used. Around half of it became the Arnold Dock in 1876, when it was made wider and deeper, and linked to Fenton Dock by a ship lock. The dock section and some of the remaining canal were filled in during the 1960s, and the remainder is in a derelict state.

== History ==
Runcorn and Weston Canal Act 1853
- Act of Parliament
- Parliament of the United Kingdom
- Long title: An Act for making a Canal from the Francis Dock, connected with the Duke of Bridgewater's Canal at Runcorn in the County of Chester, to join the Weston Canal or River Weaver Navigation at or near Weston Point in the same Parish, and to be called the Runcorn and Weston Canal.
- Citation: 16 & 17 Vict. c. xxxvii

Dates
- Royal assent: 14 June 1853

Text of statute as originally enacted

Bridgewater Trustees Act 1857
- Act of Parliament
- Parliament of the United Kingdom
- Long title: An Act to enable the Trustees of the Will of the late Francis Duke of Bridgewater to complete the Purchase of the Runcorn and Weston Canal, and to enable such Trustees more effectually to administer the Trusts of the Will of the said Duke.
- Citation: 20 & 21 Vict. c. 4 Pr.

Dates
- Royal assent: 25 August 1857

Text of statute as originally enacted

The idea for a canal to link the Bridgewater Canal to the River Weaver Navigation was first proposed in late 1852, when the Bridgewater's general manager, Fereday Smith, met with the trustees of the Weaver. Its purpose was to aid the transfer of salt between the two systems. The canal was authorised by an act of Parliament, the Runcorn and Weston Canal Act 1853 (16 & 17 Vict. c. xxxvii), passed on 14 June 1853, which specified that the canal was to run from Francis Dock, which was connected to the Duke of Bridgewater's Canal at Runcorn, to a junction with the River Weaver Navigation or Weston Canal at Weston Point. It was to be privately funded by the Earl of Ellesmere, who could sell it to his trustees once it was built and then charge tolls for its use. The earl died in 1857, when the canal was only partly built, and a new act of Parliament was required, as the trustees did not have powers to deal with the new earl. The Bridgewater Trustees Act 1857 (20 & 21 Vict. c. 4 Pr.) enabled them to buy the unfinished canal and complete its construction. The cost of this work was restricted to £40,000. The length of the canal was about 1.4 miles (2.3 km), with a lock at either end, suitable for boats which were 72.2 by 18.4 feet (22.0 by 5.6 m). The work was completed in 1859, but the canal seems to have been little used, as traffic figures for 1883 indicate that only 4,400 tons of salt travelled along the canal, out of a total of 36,400 tons which arrived at Runcorn Docks from the River Weaver.

When first built, there was a lock near to the junction with the Weston Canal, and another where the canal joined Francis Dock at Runcorn. This end of the canal was changed as a result of work carried out in 1876. The Bridgewater Canal Company turned the first section into a ship basin, by increasing the depth to 15 feet (4.6 m). They also made it 14 feet (4.3 m) wider and built wharves along the side nearest to the Mersey. Runcorn lock was moved along the canal to the end of the widened section, close to Weston Point Docks. The ship basin was called Arnold Dock, and was connected to Fenton Dock by a large lock with three sets of gates, allowing ships up to 120 by 26 feet (36.6 by 7.9 m) with a draught of 15 feet (4.6 m) to moor and unload in the basin. The docks prospered, handling 500,000 tons in total during 1877, although the proportion moving along the canal was relatively small. The original lock into Francis Dock appears to have been retained for a while but by 1907 the gates had been removed, since Francis Dock and Arnold Dock were maintained at one level, while Fenton Dock, Alfred Dock, Tidal Dock and Old Dock were maintained at a lower level.

With the coming of the Manchester Ship Canal, its function continued, as the large shipping using that canal was also a hazard to the smaller canal boats. The canal remained navigable until the early 1960s: the author John Seymour, in his book Voyage into England, described a difficult 1963 journey up the almost-dry canal at which time a Manchester Ship Canal official commented that it had been "physically, as well as officially" closed for a year. The flights of locks from the Bridgewater Canal down to Runcorn Docks were filled in when the Runcorn-Widnes road bridge was constructed in 1966. About half of the Runcorn and Weston Canal was filled in at the same time. The southern half remains in water, but is in a derelict state.

In 2015 the Runcorn Locks Restoration Society launched its Unlock Runcorn campaign, which is dedicated to reopening the flight of locks in Runcorn's Old Town. The society believes that the increase in passing boat trade that would come from reopening the locks has the potential to bring economical, recreational and social benefits to people within the region.

== Today ==
The new flight of locks from the Bridgewater Canal was abandoned in 1966, but the old flight was left in place and covered over. Its line is protected by the local council, and there are plans to re-open the locks. This would almost certainly result in the Runcorn and Weston Canal being reopened, to provide somewhere for pleasure craft which have descended the flight to go without having to negotiate passage on the Manchester Ship Canal. Peel Ports, owners of the Manchester Ship Canal, have eased the restrictions on pleasure boats wishing to cruise the Ship Canal, requiring advance notice and a simple 'seaworthiness' survey. Boats on the Shropshire Union Canal can reach Weston Marsh Lock by joining the Ship Canal at Ellesmere Port, or a longer journey is possible from the Bridgewater Canal, which connects to the Ship Canal at the Manchester end by a lock into Pomona No. 3 Dock.

== Points of interest ==
Point	Coordinates (Links to map resources)	OS Grid Ref	Notes
Pre-1876 lock into Francis Dock	53.3367°N 2.7533°W	SJ499824	
Lock into Fenton Dock	53.3366°N 2.7540°W	SJ498824	
Post-1876 lock into Arnold Dock	53.3320°N 2.7585°W	SJ495819	
Jn with Weston Canal	53.3243°N 2.7582°W	SJ495810	

== See also ==
- Canals of Great Britain
- History of the British canal system
