= Old Quay Bridge =

Swing Bridge in Runcorn

Coordinates: 53.3439°N 2.7220°W

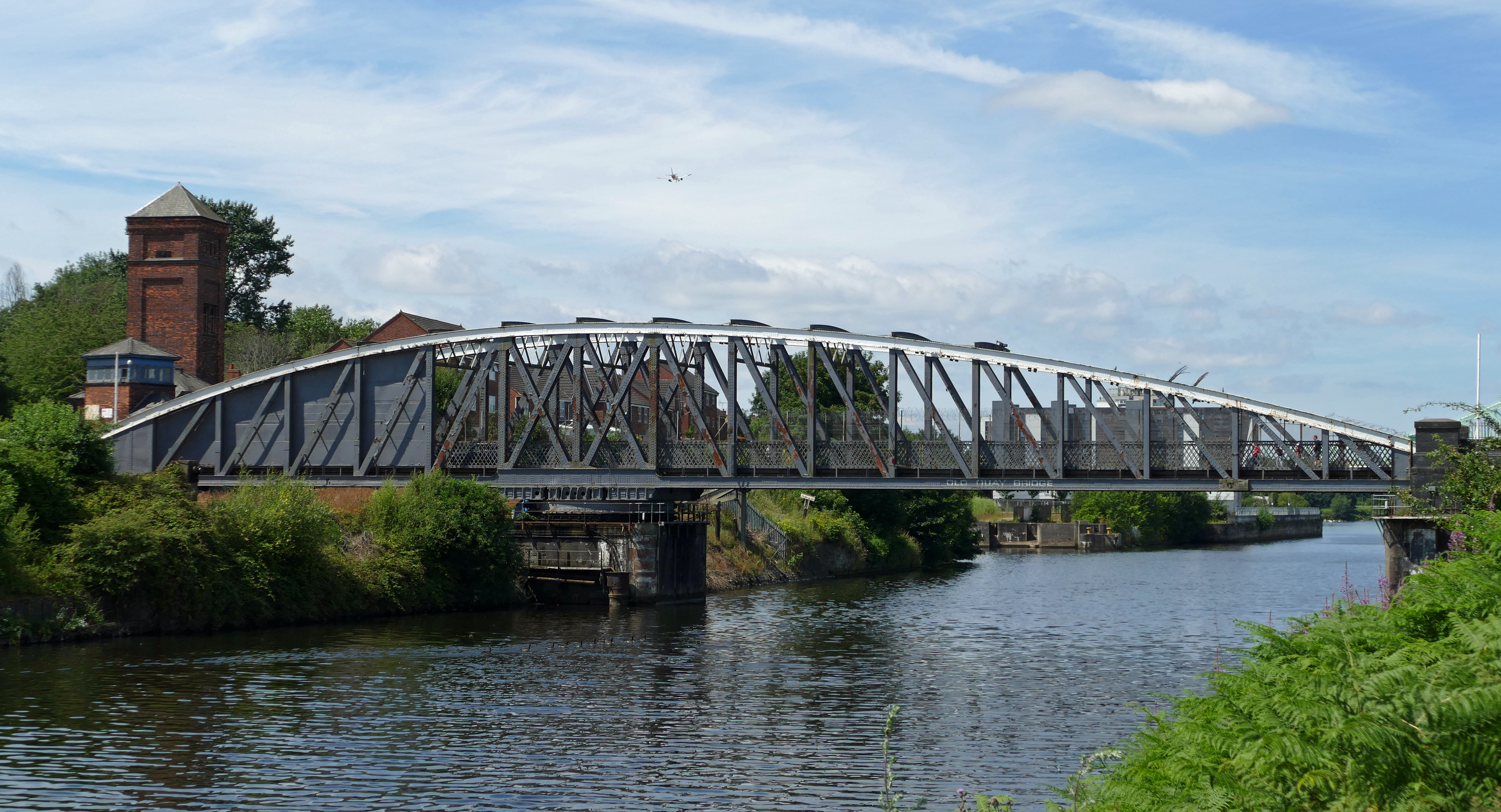
Old Quay Bridge

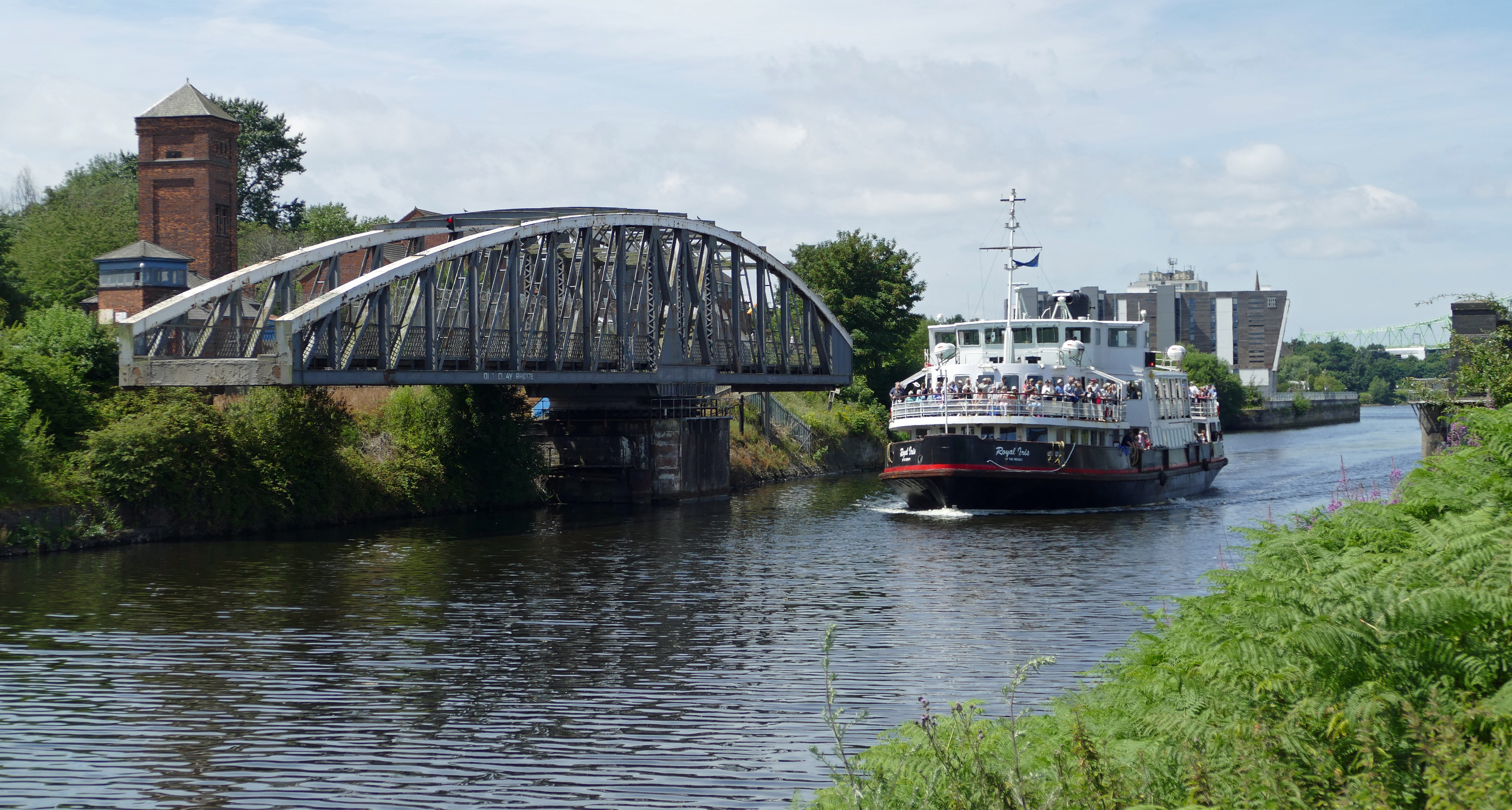
Old Quay Bridge fully open to allow passage of a ship

Old Quay Bridge is a Grade II listed swing bridge in Runcorn, England.

== History ==
Old Quay Bridge is a swing bridge across the Manchester Ship Canal between Runcorn and Wigg Island, built circa 1894. It took its name from the Old Quay Canal, a now defunct canal which is more commonly known as the Runcorn to Latchford Canal.

== Usage ==
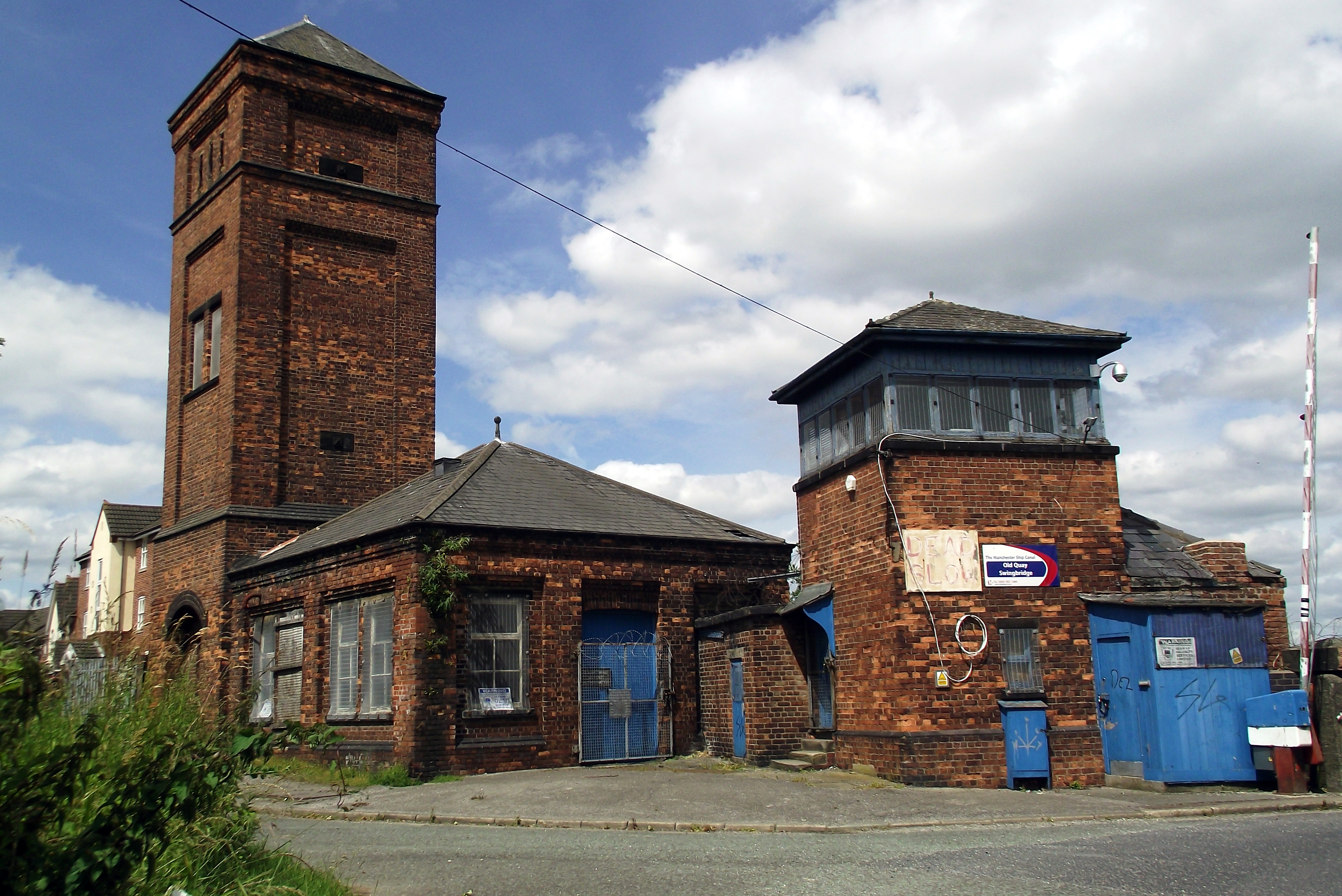
Control room for the swing bridge

The bridge is still in use and is opened for traffic along the canal. The swing mechanism is operated from a control room on the Runcorn side of the bridge.
