= Moore Nature Reserve =

Nature reserve in Moore, Cheshire, England

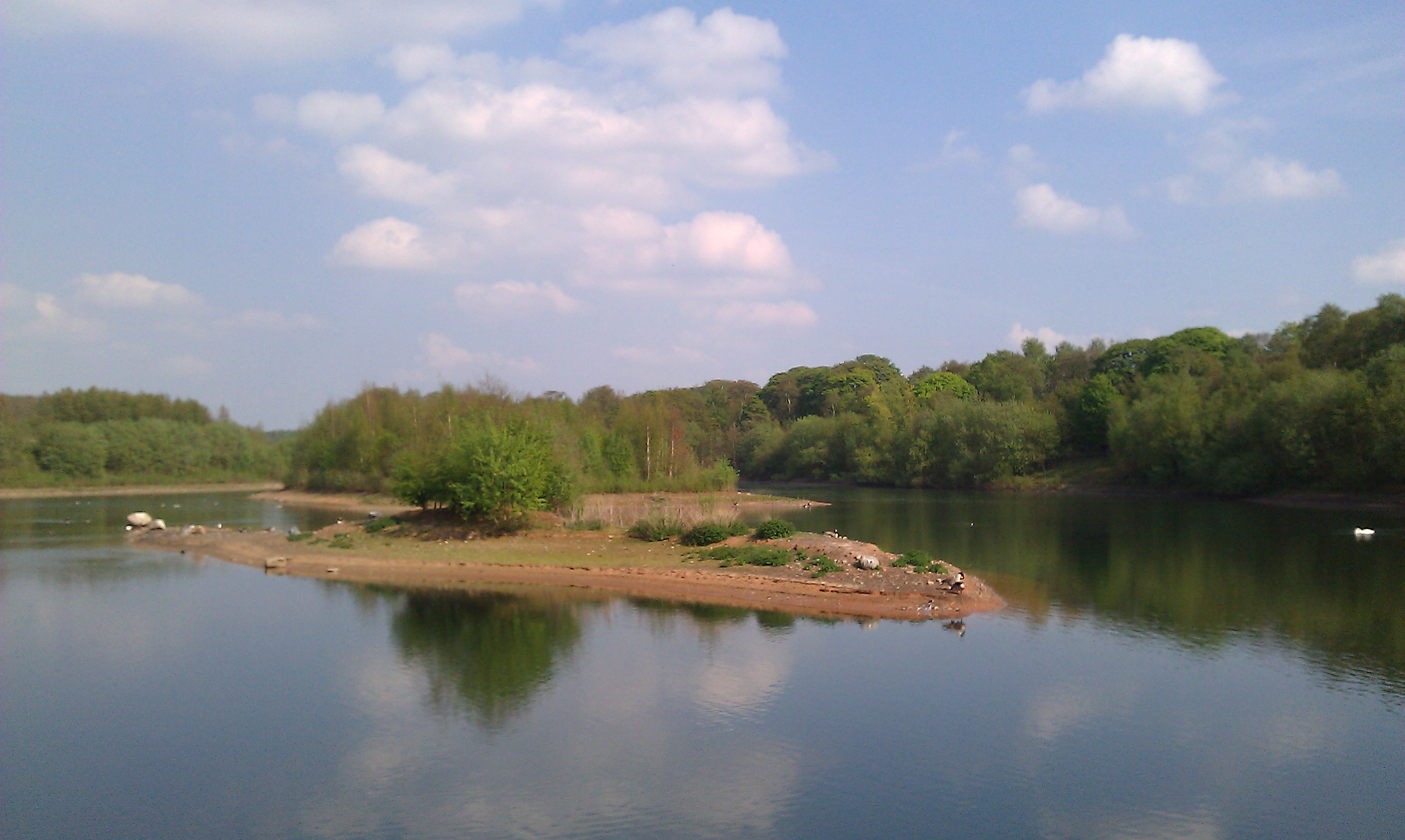
- The main lake
- Interactive map of Moore Nature Reserve
- Location: Moore, Cheshire
- Coordinates: 53.3690°N 2.6242°W
- Website: Official website

Moore Nature Reserve is a nature reserve in the village of Moore in Halton, Cheshire, England. Created from an area which had included a sand quarry and farmland, and run by FCC Environment who operate the nearby Arpley landfill site, the reserve covers 200 acres (81 ha) and is considered one of the best places in Cheshire for birdwatching.

== History ==
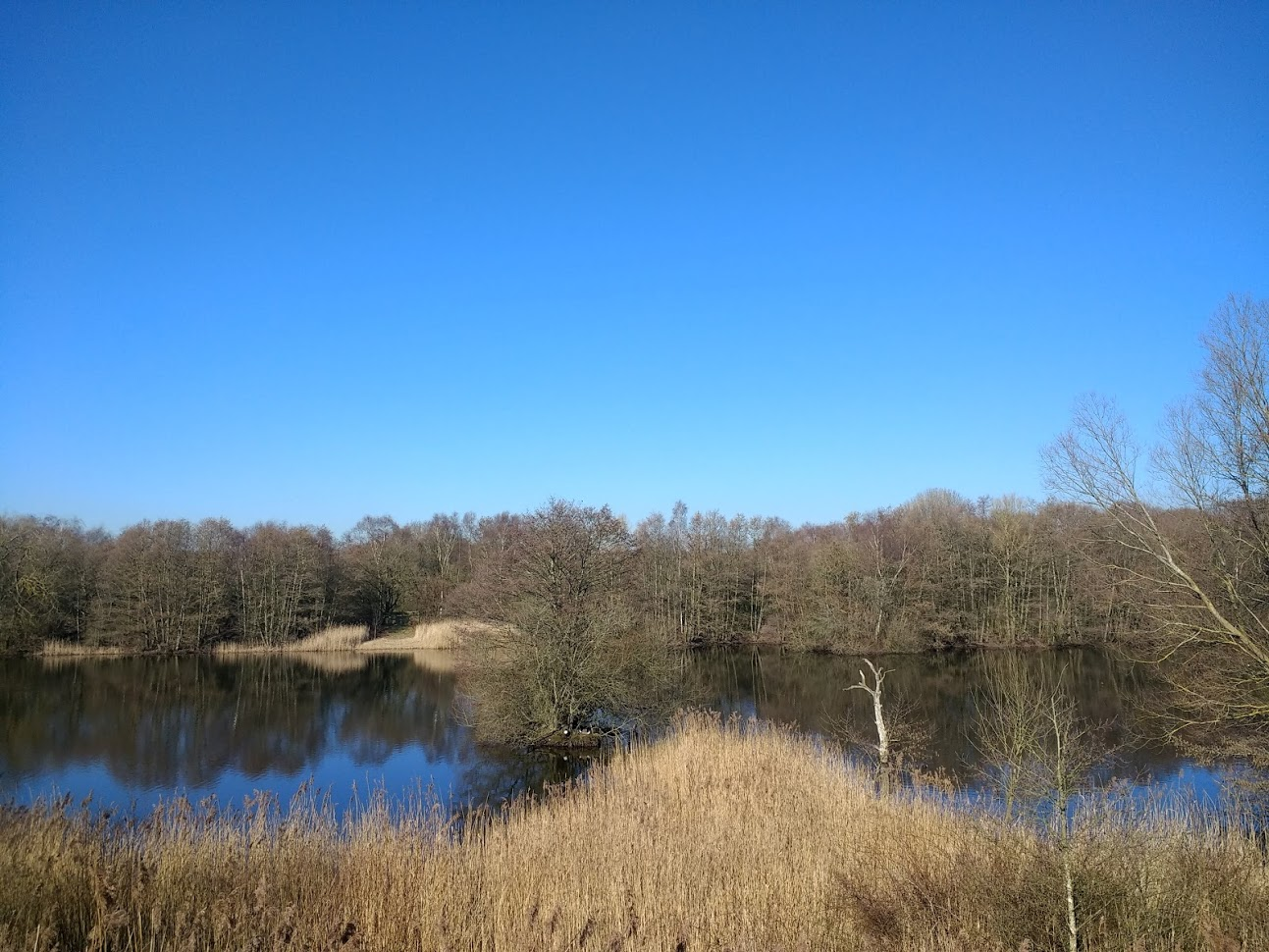
Moore Nature Reserve

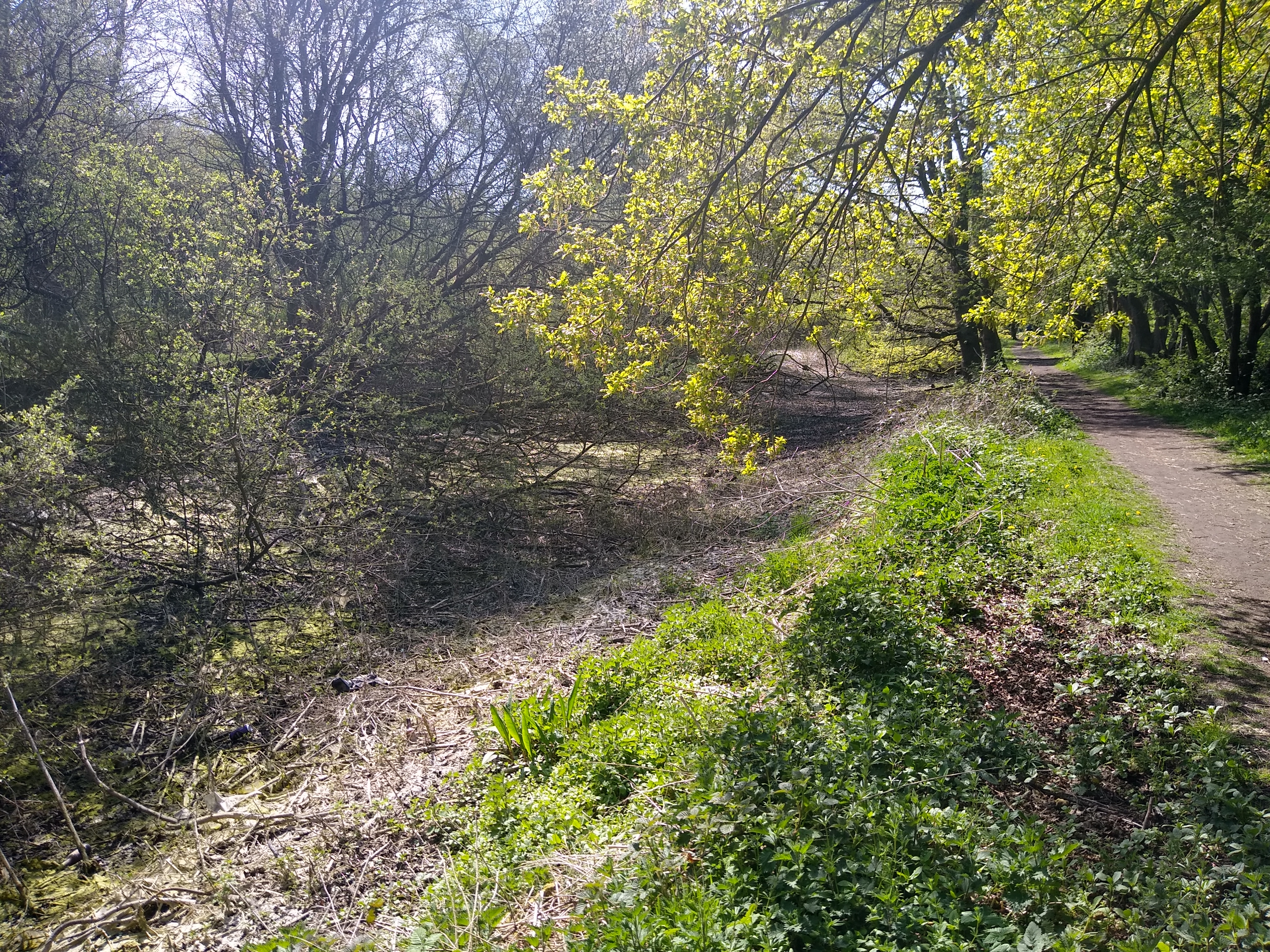
The Runcorn to Latchford canal

The 200-acre reserve lies alongside the Manchester Ship Canal and is bisected by the de-watered course of the Runcorn to Latchford Canal. Before becoming a nature reserve, it was used as farmland and for sand quarrying. The land is owned by Peel Holdings, who have it licensed as a landfill site and only protected until 2021. Part of the reserve has been registered to be used in the expansion of Port Warrington.

== Facilities ==
It is managed by wardens employed by FCC Environment, operators of nearby Arpley Landfill site. Arpley Landfill began operating in 1988 and covers more than 500 acres (200 ha). The landfill no longer accepts waste and is being restored to a mix of woodland and grassland and, together with Moore Nature Reserve, will eventually provide an important public amenity and area of rich biodiversity on the edge of what is a busy, and growing urban area. Access is made freely available to the public and there are maintained footpaths around the reserve.

== Bird watching ==
There are five lakes, woodland, meadows, bird feeding stations and nine bird hides covering the lakes. The RSPB state that is one of the best in Cheshire for birdwatching, noting that it hosts all three species of woodpecker including the lesser spotted woodpecker, and five species of British owls including tawny owls.

== See also ==
- List of parks and open spaces in Cheshire
