= Mount Manisty =

Manmade hill in Cheshire, England

Coordinates: 53°18′13.38″N 02°54′50.24″W

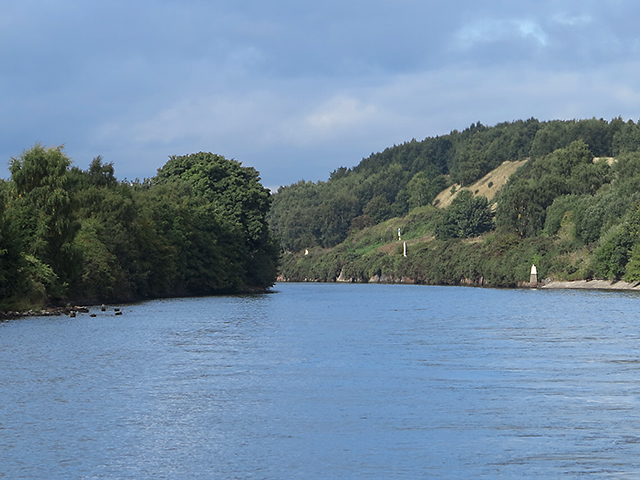
The slopes of Mount Manisty (right) next to the Manchester Ship Canal.

Mount Manisty is a large uninhabited man-made hillock located between the Manchester Ship Canal and the River Mersey 1.5 miles (2.4 km) northwest of Ellesmere Port in Cheshire, England. The mound, which is 100 feet (30 m) tall, was created from earth excavated during the building of the ship canal between Eastham and Ellesmere Port in the late 19th century. The feature forms a narrow elevated stretch of land between the canal (this section of navigation is known as Manisty cutting) and the river.

Mount Manisty takes its name from the departmental engineer who was in charge of construction of this section, Edward Manisty, the second son of Sir Henry Manisty, one of the Justices of the Queen's Bench Division of the High Court of Justice.

The mound, which is described as a "striking feature" and a "considerable elevation", is also reportedly "bleak and pock-marked with rabbit holes". After Mount Manisty, the ship canal crosses the Frodsham marshes towards the Weaver Sluices and Runcorn. Stanlow Island and Ince mud banks lie in the upper Mersey estuary at this point along with several sand banks, particularly near Mount Manisty. The physical and chemical properties of these mud banks have been studied.

== See also ==
- Artificial island
- Land reclamation
- Land recycling
- Polder
