= The Excavation of the Manchester Ship Canal =

1891 paintings by Benjamin Williams Leader

The British landscape artist Benjamin Williams Leader made two oil paintings in 1891 depicting the excavation of the Manchester Ship Canal, one held by the National Trust at Tatton Park and the second at Oldham Gallery.

Leader was the younger brother of the engineer Edward Leader Williams who designed the canal. (The artist changed the order of his names, as he considered Leader to be more distinctive than Williams.) Leader had established a reputation as a painter of evocative and earthy country scenes by the time he made the paintings.

The painting has not always been appreciated: in his book Landscape into Art, published in 1949, the art critic Kenneth Clark contemptuously dismissed its earthy tones as "squalid".

== Tatton version ==
One version of the painting is held by the National Trust at Tatton Hall. The Excavation of the Manchester Ship Canal: Eastham Cutting, 1891 (also known as The Excavation of the Manchester Ship Canal: Eastham Cutting with Mount Manisty in the distance) measures 124.5 cm × 212 cm (49.0 in × 83.5 in). It is signed and dated in the lower right corner "R. W. LEADER 1891".

Wilbraham Egerton, 1st Earl Egerton was chairman of the Board of the Manchester Ship Canal Company from 1887 to 1894 and its largest investor. He sold land to the company on which the Manchester Docks were built. A century earlier, his relation Francis Egerton, 3rd Duke of Bridgewater pioneered an earlier phase of canal building in England, including the Bridgewater Canal.

Egerton commissioned the painting. It shows the site where construction of the canal began in 1887. In the foreground are steam powered excavators, digging out a wide trench of the first part of the canal. The location was formerly a wooded beauty spot, known as the "Richmond of the Mersey", beside a broad curve of the River Mersey. The large mound in the background, known as "Mount Manisty", is a heap of spoil from the excavations, named after the agent responsible for constructing this stretch of the canal

The Tatton park collection also has a small initial sketch and a half-size modello, both bought by Maurice Egerton, 4th Baron Egerton, at the estate sale of Leader's widow at Christie's in 1927. They were all bequeathed to the National Trust by the 4th Baron Egerton, along with the park, the house, and its contents.

== Oldham version ==
A second slightly smaller version of the painting, Manchester Ship Canal: The Making of Eastham Dock, is in Oldham Gallery. It measures 112 cm × 184 cm (44 in × 72 in). It was a gift to the gallery in 1927 by Miss Nany Platt. Her father Samuel Radcliffe Platt (son of the MP John Platt and head of the textile company Platt Brothers ) was also a director of the Manchester Ship Canal Company from 1885 to 1891. Samuel Platt carried the company's directors on his yacht, Norseman, on an inaugural voyage along the canal on 1 January 1894.

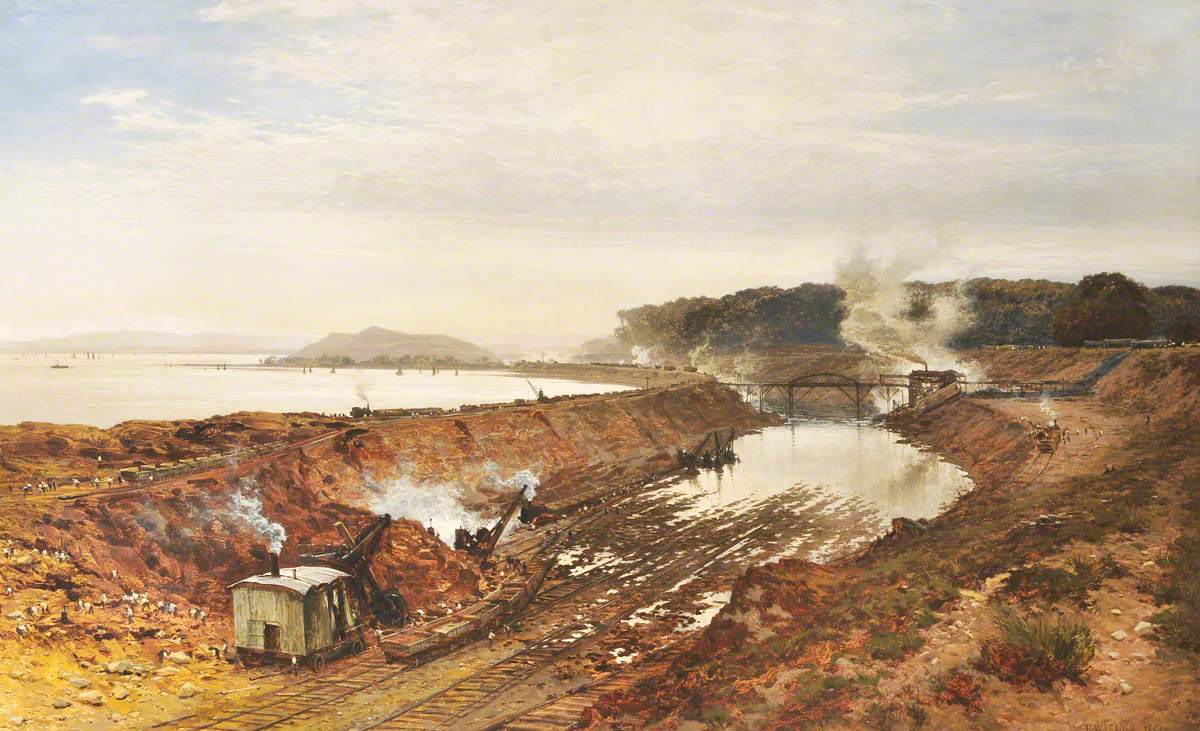
The Excavation of the Manchester Ship Canal: Eastham Cutting with Mount Manisty in the distance, 124.5 cm × 212.1 cm (49.0 in × 83.5 in), National Trust

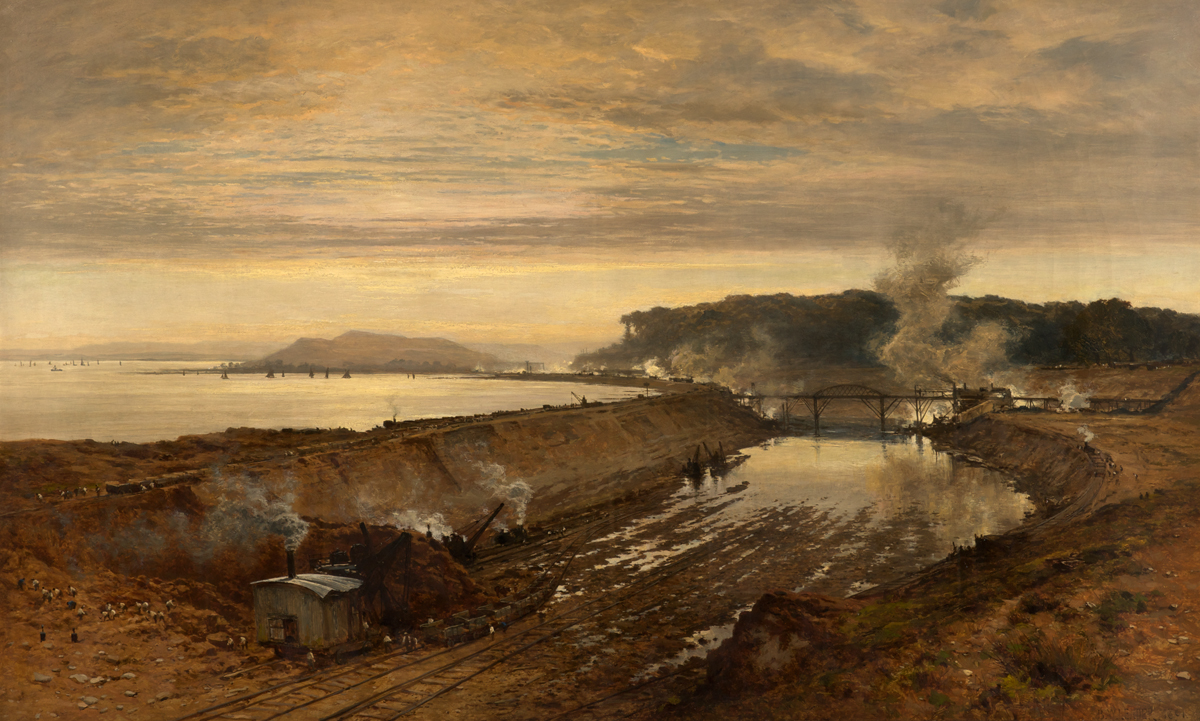
Manchester Ship Canal: The Making of Eastham Dock, 112 cm × 184 cm (44 in × 72 in), Oldham Gallery

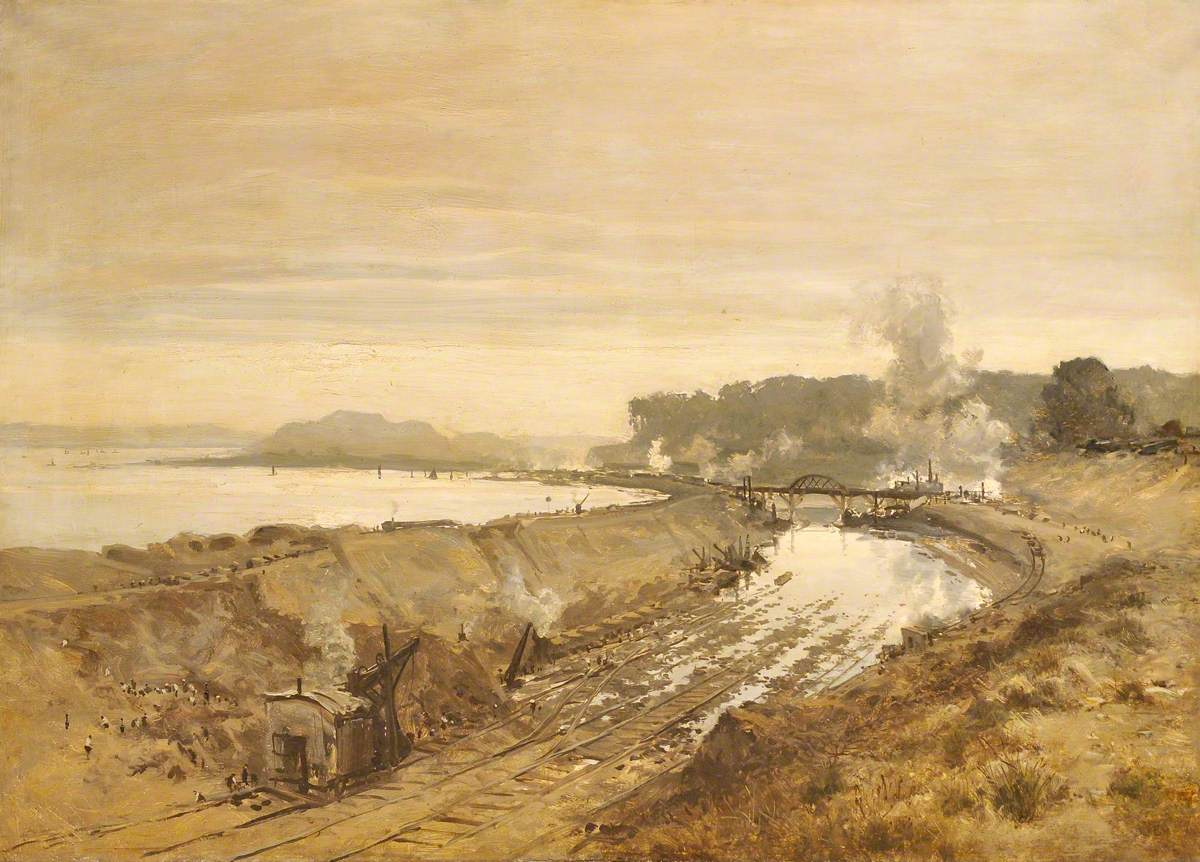
Modello, 90.2 cm × 152.4 cm (35.5 in × 60.0 in), National Trust

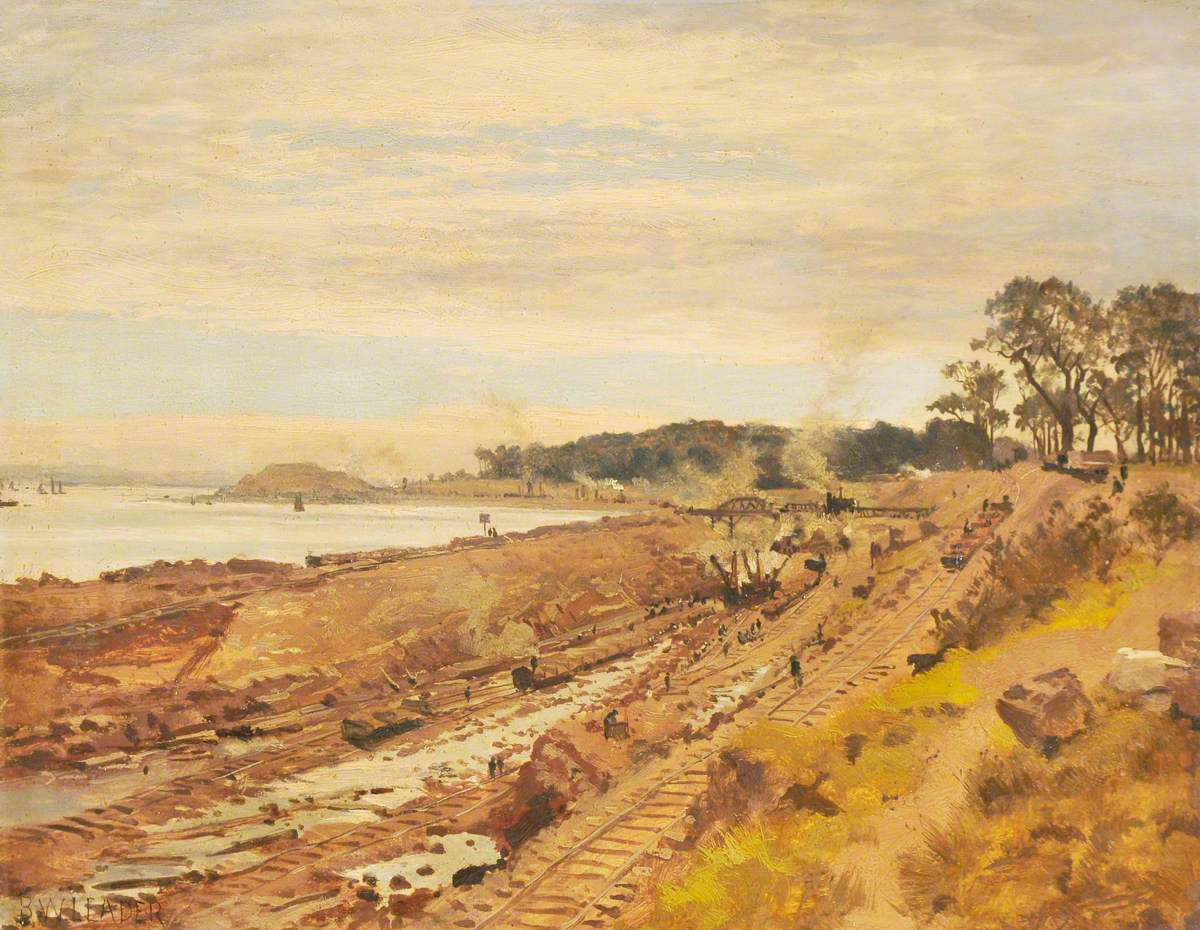
Sketch, 39.4 cm × 59.7 cm (15.5 in × 23.5 in), National Trust

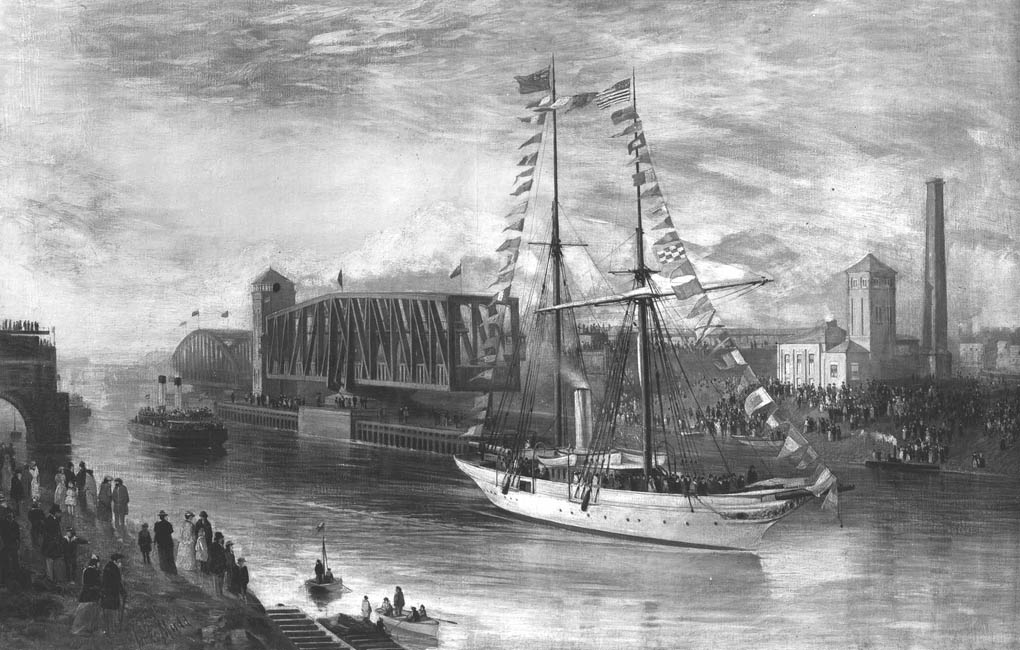
Norseman, later Mohican, was the first vessel to navigate the Manchester Ship Canal when it opened in 1894
