= Woolston Eyes =

Nature reserve in Cheshire, England

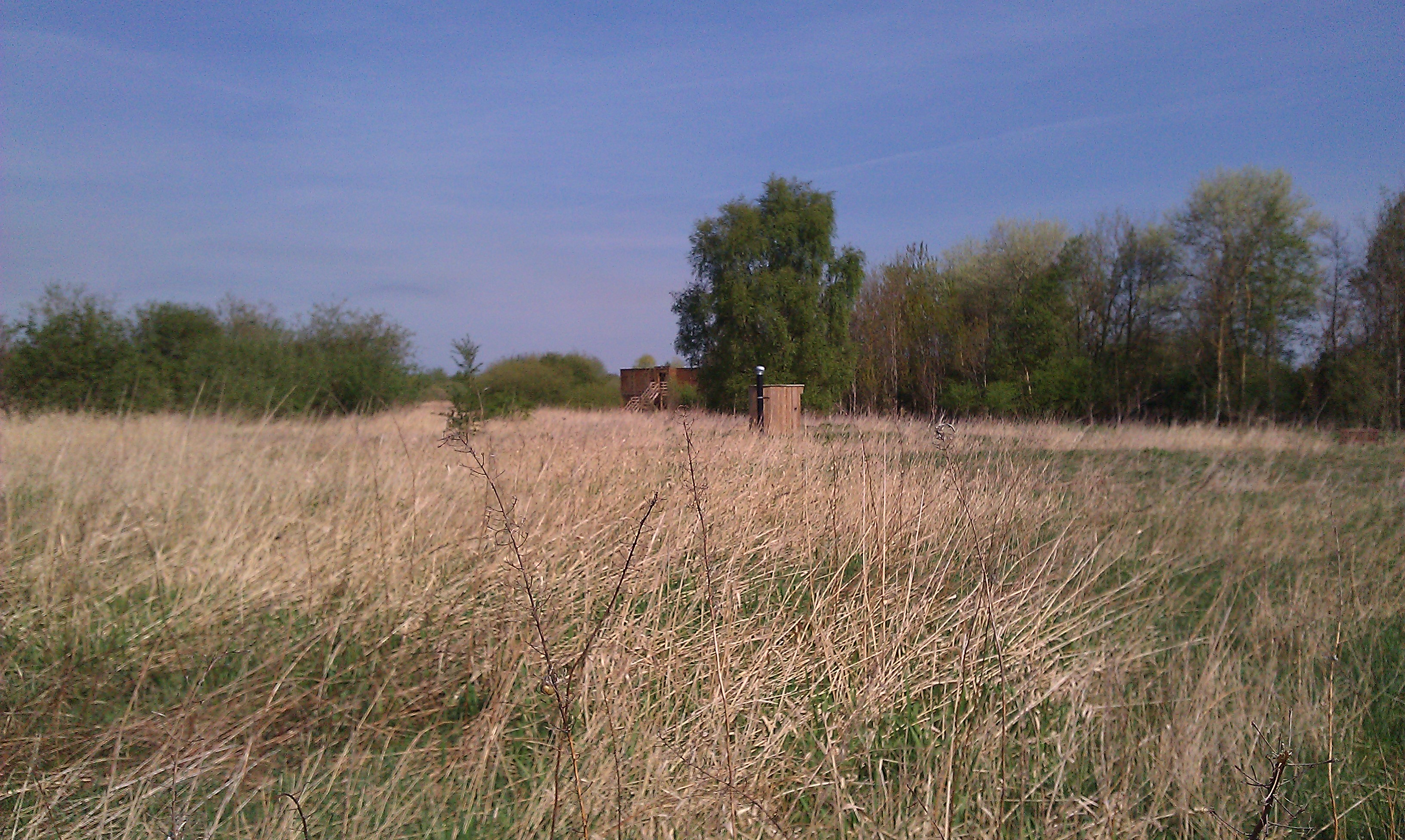
- Woolston Eyes, showing the main bird hide (erected c. 2010/11)
- Interactive map of Woolston Eyes
- Location: Warrington, England
- Coordinates: 53°23′32″N 2°30′51″W
- Status: Site of Special Scientific Interest
- Website: www.woolstoneyes.co.uk

Woolston Eyes is a Site of Special Scientific Interest located in the town of Warrington, England, alongside the Manchester Ship Canal. The eyes themselves are used for the deposition of dredgings from the Ship Canal under a Waste Management Licence issued by the Environment Agency.

The Woolston Eyes Conservation Group manages the site as a nature reserve with access by permit only. The rather strange name for the site is from Anglo-Saxon, ees meaning the land near a loop in a river.

== Wildlife ==
It is the premier UK site for breeding black-necked grebes and a stronghold for the willow tit, and other breeding birds include little grebe, great crested grebe, shelduck, Eurasian teal, Northern shoveler, water rail, common cuckoo, common kingfisher, common grasshopper warbler and Eurasian reed warbler. Woolston Eyes also supports nationally important wintering numbers of Northern shoveler, Eurasian teal gadwall and common pochard. There are 12 species of herpetofauna recorded, including sand lizard, smooth snake, natterjack toad and all three native British species of newt. It is also home to 21 species of Odonata, dragonflies and damselfies, out of 58 species found in Britain, as well as 26 species of butterfly.

== Management ==
Woolston Eyes Conservation Group, a voluntary organisation formed in 1979, manages the rich and varied wildlife of the deposit grounds with the agreement of the Manchester Ship Canal Company. Its aim is to promote the study and conservation of the wildlife and habitat of the area with particular regard to the ornithology. The group undertakes management work to preserve or maximise the ornithological value of the Reserve, provides and maintains hides for the use of the public and permit holders, keeps the paths open and discourages disturbance. The group produces an Annual Report which summarises the work carried out and the results obtained including the scientific study of the flora and fauna of the Reserve. To carry out this work the group raises funds by the sale of Permits, Annual Reports and by applying for grants from various organisations.
