= Manchester Ship Canal =

UK canal linking Manchester to the coast

Coordinates: 53.375°N 2.575°W

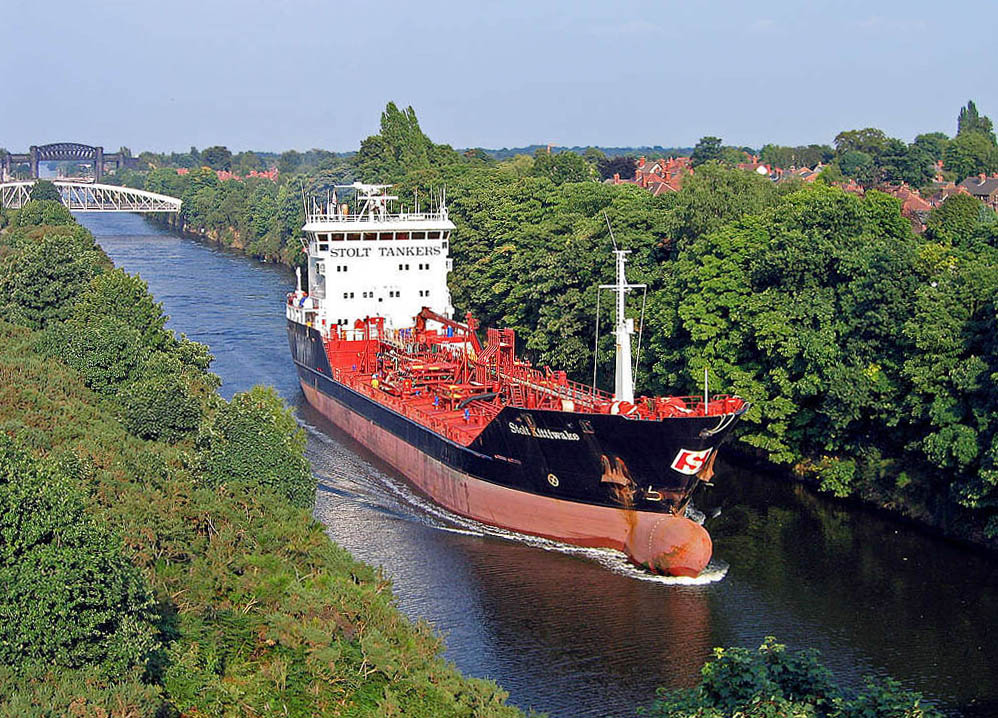
- Stolt Kittiwake heading toward the Mersey estuary, 2005
- Interactive map of Manchester Ship Canal

Specifications
- Length: 36 miles (58 km)
- Maximum boat length: 600 ft 0 in (182.9 m) (Regularly limited to 530 ft (160 m))
- Maximum boat beam: 65 ft 6 in (20.0 m) (Regularly limited to 63 ft 6 in (19.35 m))
- Locks: 5
- Status: Open
- Navigation authority: Peel Holdings

History
- Current owner: Peel Holdings
- Original owner: Manchester Ship Canal Company
- Principal engineer: Edward Leader Williams
- Date of act: 5 August 1885
- Construction began: 1887
- Date of first use: 1 January 1894
- Date completed: 7 December 1893; 132 years ago

Geography
- Start point: Eastham Locks
- End point: Salford Quays
- Connects to: River Bollin, Glaze Brook, River Mersey, River Irwell, Bridgewater Canal, Shropshire Union Canal, Weaver Navigation

The Manchester Ship Canal is a 36-mile-long (58 km) inland waterway in North West England that links Manchester to the Irish Sea. Beginning in the Mersey estuary at Eastham, near Ellesmere Port in Cheshire, it generally follows the original routes of the rivers Mersey and Irwell through the historic counties of Cheshire and Lancashire before terminating to the east of Salford Quays near Pomona Docks and a junction with the Bridgewater Canal where it meets the Irwell. Several sets of locks lift vessels about 60 ft (18 m) to the canal's terminus in Manchester. Landmarks along its route include the Barton Swing Aqueduct – the world's only swing aqueduct – and Trafford Park, the world's first planned industrial estate and one of the largest in Europe.

The rivers Mersey and Irwell were first made navigable in the early 18th century. Goods were also transported on the Runcorn extension of the Bridgewater Canal (from 1776) and the Liverpool and Manchester Railway (from 1830), but by the late 19th century the Mersey and Irwell Navigation had fallen into disrepair and was often unusable. Manchester's business community viewed the charges imposed by Liverpool's docks and the railway companies as excessive. A ship canal was proposed to give ocean-going vessels direct access to Manchester. The region was suffering from the Long Depression; the canal's proponents argued that the scheme would boost competition and create jobs. They gained public support for the scheme, which was first presented to Parliament as a bill in 1882. Faced with stiff opposition from Liverpool, the canal's supporters were unable to gain the necessary act of Parliament to allow the scheme to go ahead until 1885.

Construction took six years, beginning in 1887, and cost just over £15 million (equivalent to £1,705,000,000 in 2025). When the ship canal opened in January 1894 (12 years after the first meeting of the Manchester Ship Canal company) it was the largest river navigation canal in the world and enabled the new Port of Manchester to become Britain's third-busiest port despite being about 40 mi (60 km) inland. Changes to shipping methods and the growth of containerisation during the 1970s and 1980s meant that many ships were too big to use the canal; and traffic declined, resulting in the closure of the terminal docks at Salford. Although able to accommodate vessels from coastal ships to intercontinental cargo liners, the canal was not large enough for most modern vessels. By 2011, traffic had decreased from its peak in 1958 of 18 million long tons (20 million short tons) of freight each year to about 8 million long tons (9.0 million short tons). The canal is now privately owned by Peel Holdings, whose plans include redevelopment, expansion and an increase in shipping from 8,000 containers a year to 100,000 by 2030 as part of its Atlantic Gateway project.

== History ==
The canal was completed just as the Long Depression was coming to an end, but in its early years it was not the commercial success its sponsors had hoped for. At first, gross revenue was less than a quarter of expected net revenue; and throughout at least its first nineteen years the canal was unable to make a profit or meet the interest payments to the Corporation of Manchester. Many ship owners were reluctant to dispatch ocean-going vessels along a "locked cul-de-sac" at a maximum speed of 6 knots (11 km/h; 6.9 mph). The Ship Canal Company, which developed the canal, found it difficult to attract a diversified export trade; this meant that ships frequently had to return down the canal loaded with ballast rather than freight. However, traffic gradually developed and the Canal became successful, paying dividends from 1921 onwards. As the import trade in oil began to grow during the 20th century, the balance of canal traffic gradually switched towards the west, from Salford to Stanlow. Unlike most other British canals, the Manchester Ship Canal was never nationalised.

=== Early history ===
The idea that the rivers Mersey and Irwell should be made navigable from the Mersey estuary in the west to Manchester in the east was first proposed in 1660 and revived in 1712 by the English civil engineer Thomas Steers. The necessary legislation was proposed in 1720, and the Act of Parliament for the navigation, the Rivers Mercy and Irwell Navigation Act 1720 (7 Geo. 1. St. 1. c. 15), passed into law in 1721. Construction began in 1724, undertaken by the Mersey and Irwell Navigation Company. By 1734 boats "of moderate size" were able to make the journey from quays near Water Street in Manchester to the Irish Sea, but the navigation was only suitable for small ships; during periods of low rainfall or when strong easterly winds held back the tide in the estuary, there was not always sufficient depth of water for a fully laden boat. The completion in 1776 of the Runcorn extension of the Bridgewater Canal, followed in 1830 by the opening of the Liverpool and Manchester Railway, intensified competition for the carriage of goods.

In 1825 an application had been made to Parliament for an Act to allow the construction of a ship canal between the mouth of the River Dee and Manchester at a cost of £1 million; however, "the necessary forms not having been observed", it did not become law. In 1844 ownership of the Mersey and Irwell Navigation was transferred to the Bridgewater Trustees, and in 1872 it was sold to the Bridgewater Navigation Company for £1.112 million. The navigation had by then fallen into disrepair, its owners preferring instead to maintain the more profitable canal; in 1882 the navigation was described as being "hopelessly choked with silt and filth", and was closed to all but the smaller boats for 264 out of 311 working days.

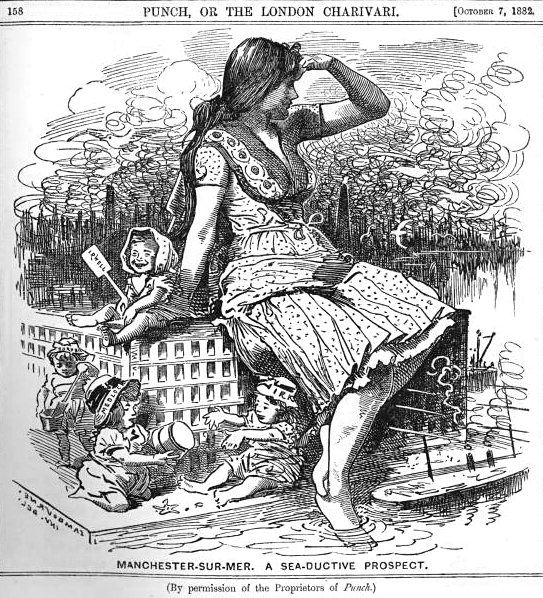
A cartoon published in the satirical magazine Punch in 1882, ridiculing the idea that Manchester could become a major seaport

Along with deteriorating economic conditions in the 1870s and the start of a period known as the Long Depression, the dues charged by the Port of Liverpool and the railway charges from there to Manchester were perceived to be excessive by Manchester's business community; it was often cheaper to import goods from Hull, on the opposite side of the country, than it was from Liverpool. A ship canal was proposed as a way to reduce carriage charges, avoid payment of dock and town dues at Liverpool, and bypass the Liverpool to Manchester railways by giving Manchester direct access to the sea for its imports and its exports of manufactured goods. Historian Ian Harford suggested that the canal may also have been conceived as an "imaginative response to [the] problems of depression and unemployment" that Manchester was experiencing during the early 1880s. Its proponents argued that reduced transport costs would make local industry more competitive and that the scheme would help create new jobs.

The idea was championed by Manchester manufacturer Daniel Adamson, who arranged a meeting at his home, The Towers in Didsbury, on 27 June 1882. He invited the representatives of several Lancashire towns, local businessmen and politicians, and two civil engineers: Hamilton Fulton and Edward Leader Williams. Fulton's design was for a tidal canal, with no locks and a deepened channel into Manchester. With the city about 60 feet (18 m) above sea level, the docks and quays would have been well below the surrounding surface. Williams' plan was to dredge a channel between a set of retaining walls, and build a series of locks and sluices to lift incoming vessels up to Manchester. Both engineers were invited to submit their proposals, and Williams' plans were selected to form the basis of a Bill to be submitted to Parliament later that year.

=== Public campaign ===
To generate support for the scheme, the provisional committee initiated a public campaign led by Joseph Lawrence, who had worked for the Hull and Barnsley Railway. His task was to set up committees in every ward in Manchester and throughout Lancashire, to raise subscriptions and sell the idea to the local public. The first meeting was held on 4 October in Manchester's Oxford Ward, followed by another on 17 October in the St. James Ward. Within a few weeks meetings had been held throughout Manchester and Salford, culminating in a conference on 3 November attended by the provisional committee and members of the various Ward Committees. A large meeting of the working classes, attended by several local notables including the general secretaries of several trade unions, was held on 13 November at the Free Trade Hall in Manchester.

Regular night-time meetings were held across the region, headed by speakers from a range of professions. Harford suggests that the organisers' choice of orators represents their "canny ability" to choose speakers who might move their audiences to support their cause. By adopting techniques used by the Anti-Corn Law League, their strategy was ultimately successful: local offices were acquired, secretaries hired and further meetings organised. The weekly Ship Canal Gazette, priced at one penny, was by the end of the year being sold at newsagents in towns across Lancashire. The Gazette was part of a prolonged print campaign organised by the committee, to circulate leaflets and pamphlets, and write supportive letters to the local press, often signed with pseudonyms. One of the few surviving leaflets, "The Manchester Ship Canal. Reasons why it Should be Made", argued against dock and railway rates, which were apparently levied "with the object of protecting the interests of Railway kings, [so that] trade is handicapped, and wages kept low". By the end of 1882 the provisional committee comprised members from several of Manchester's large industries, but notably few of the city's wealthier inhabitants. The sympathetic Manchester City News reported that "the rich men of South and East Lancashire, with a few notable exceptions, have not rivalled the enthusiasm of the general public".

=== Bills ===
Cheque dated 3 August 1887, in the amount of £1,710,000, for the purchase of the Bridgewater Navigation Company. At the time it was the largest cheque ever presented.

The Mersey Docks and Harbour Board opposed the committee's first Bill, presented late in 1882, and it was rejected by Parliament in January 1883 for breaching Standing Orders. Within six weeks the committee organised hundreds of petitions from a range of bodies across the country: one representing Manchester was signed by almost 200,000 people. The requirement for Standing Orders was dispensed with, and the represented Bill allowed to proceed. Some witnesses against the scheme expressed apprehension that a canal would cause the entrance to the Mersey estuary to silt up and block traffic; they cited the case of Chester harbour, which had silted up due to a man-made cut through the Dee estuary. Faced with conflicting evidence, Parliament rejected the Bill. Later mass meetings were held, including a large demonstration at Pomona Gardens on 24 June 1884. Strong opposition from Liverpool led the House of Commons Committee to reject the committee's second Bill on 1 August 1884.

Manchester Ship Canal Act 1885
- Act of Parliament
- Parliament of the United Kingdom
- Long title: An Act to authorize the construction of a Ship Canal to Manchester; and for other Purposes.
- Citation: 48 & 49 Vict. c. clxxxviii

Dates
- Royal assent: 6 August 1885

Manchester Ship Canal Act 1896
- Act of Parliament
- Parliament of the United Kingdom
- Long title: An Act to enable the Manchester Ship Canal Company to alter certain works authorised by the Manchester Ship Canal Act 1885 and the Manchester Ship Canal (Tidal Openings &c.) Act 1890 to make a Railway at Salford and other works to amend the former Acts of the Company and for other purposes.
- Citation: 59 & 60 Vict. c. clxxxii

Dates
- Royal assent: 7 August 1896

Text of statute as originally enacted

An unresolved question, which had remained a sticking point, was that of what would happen to the Mersey estuary were the canal to be built. During questioning, an engineer for the Mersey Docks and Harbour Board was asked how he would avoid such a problem. His reply, "I should enter at Eastham and carry the canal along the shore until I reached Runcorn, and then I would strike inland", prompted Williams to change his design to include this suggestion. Despite continued opposition, the committee's third Bill, presented in November 1884, was passed by Parliament on 2 May 1885, and received royal assent on 6 August, becoming the Manchester Ship Canal Act 1885 (48 & 49 Vict. c. clxxxviii). Certain conditions were attached; £5 million had to be raised, and the ship canal company was legally obliged to buy both the Bridgewater Canal and the Mersey & Irwell Navigation within two years. The estimated cost of construction was £5.16 million, and the work was expected to take four years to complete.

=== Financing ===
The Manchester Ship Canal Act 1885 stipulated that the ship canal company's £8 million share capital had to be issued within two years, otherwise the act would lapse. Adamson wanted to encourage the widest possible share ownership and believed the funds should be raised largely from the working population. Richard Peacock, vice-chairman of the Provisional Manchester Ship Canal Committee, said in 1882:

No few individuals should be expected to subscribe and form a company for mere gain; it should be taken on by the public, and if it is not ... I for one should say drop the scheme ... unless I see the public coming forward in a hearty manner.

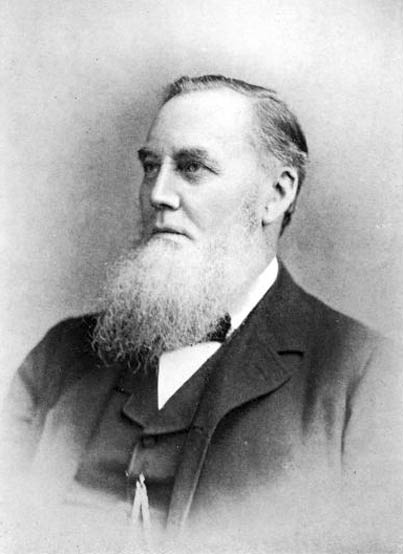
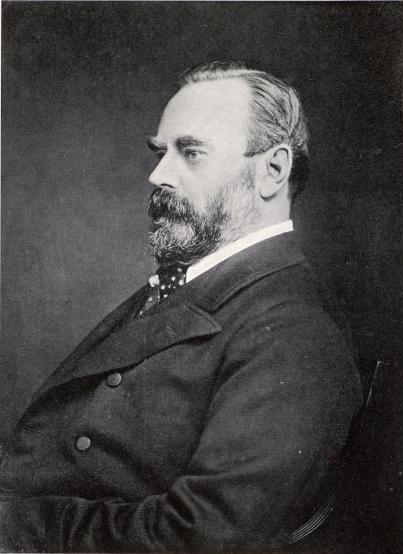
Company chairman Daniel Adamson (left) resigned early in 1887. He was replaced by Wilbraham Egerton, 1st Earl Egerton (right).

The Manchester Ship Canal Act 1885 forbade the company from issuing shares below £10; so, to make them easier for ordinary people to buy, they issued shilling coupons in books of ten so they could be paid for in instalments. The construction costs and expected competition from the Port of Liverpool put off potential investors; by May 1887 only £3 million had been raised. As a temporary solution Thomas Walker, the contractor selected to construct the canal, agreed to accept £500,000 of the contract price in shares, but raising the remainder required another act of Parliament to allow the company's share capital to be restructured as £3 million of ordinary shares and £4 million of preference shares. Adamson opposed the debt restructuring, convinced as he was that the money should be raised from members of the public, and resigned as chairman of the Ship Canal Committee on 1 February 1887. Barings and Rothschild jointly issued a prospectus for the sale of the preference shares on 15 July, and by 21 July the issue had been fully underwritten, allowing construction to begin. The first sod was cut on 11 November 1887, by Lord Egerton of Tatton, who had taken over the chairmanship of the Manchester Ship Canal Company from Adamson.

The canal company exhausted its capital of £8 million in four years, by which time only half the construction work was completed. In order to avoid bankruptcy it appealed for funds to Manchester Corporation, which set up a Ship Canal Committee. The corporation decided on 9 March 1891, on the committee's recommendation, to lend the necessary £3 million, to preserve the city's prestige. In return, the corporation was allowed to appoint five of the fifteen members of the board of directors. The company subsequently raised its estimates of the cost of completion in September 1891 and again in June 1892. An executive committee was appointed as an emergency measure in December 1891, and on 14 October 1892 the Ship Canal Committee resolved to lend a further £1.5 million on condition that Manchester Corporation had an absolute majority on the canal company's board of directors and its various sub-committees. The corporation subsequently appointed 11 of the 21 seats, nominated Alderman Sir John Harwood as deputy director of the company, and secured majorities on five of the board's six sub-committees. The cost to Manchester Corporation of financing the Manchester Ship Canal Company had a significant impact on local taxpayers. Manchester's municipal debt rose by 67 per cent, resulting in a 26 per cent increase in rates between 1892 and 1895.

However well this arrangement served the corporation, by the mid-1980s it had become "meaningless". Most of the company's shares were controlled by the property developer John Whittaker, and in 1986 the council agreed to give up all but one of its seats in return for a payment of £10 million. The deal extricated Manchester Council from a politically difficult conflict of interest, as Whittaker was proposing to develop a large out-of-town shopping centre on land owned by the Ship Canal Company at Dumplington, the present-day Trafford Centre. The council opposed the scheme, believing that it would damage the city centre economy, but accepted that it was "obviously in the interests of the shareholders". (Note: £7 million was paid in cash and £3 million invested in a joint venture company set up by Whittaker and the council, Ship Canal Developments. The object of the new company was to provide resources and development expertise for the regeneration of east Manchester.)

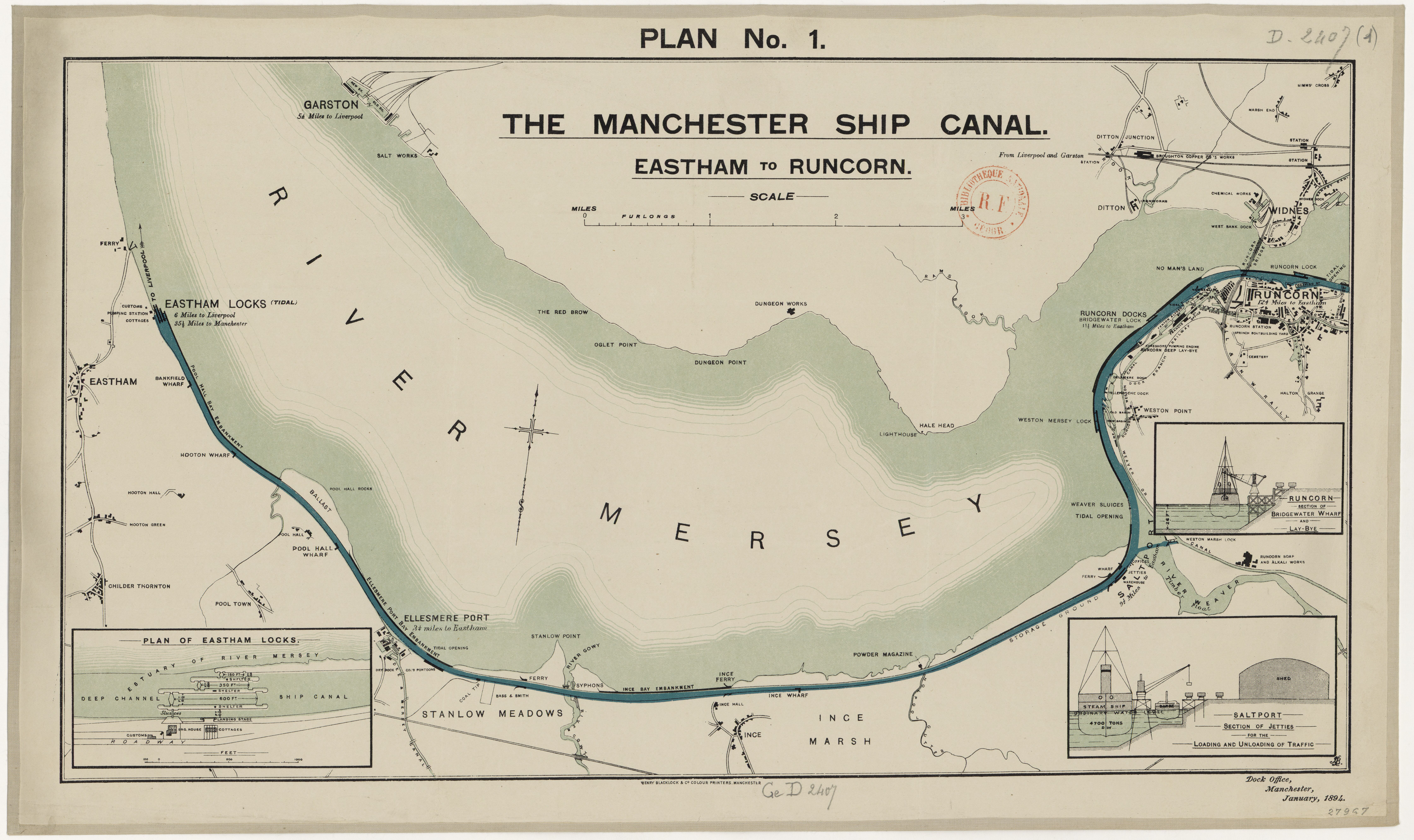
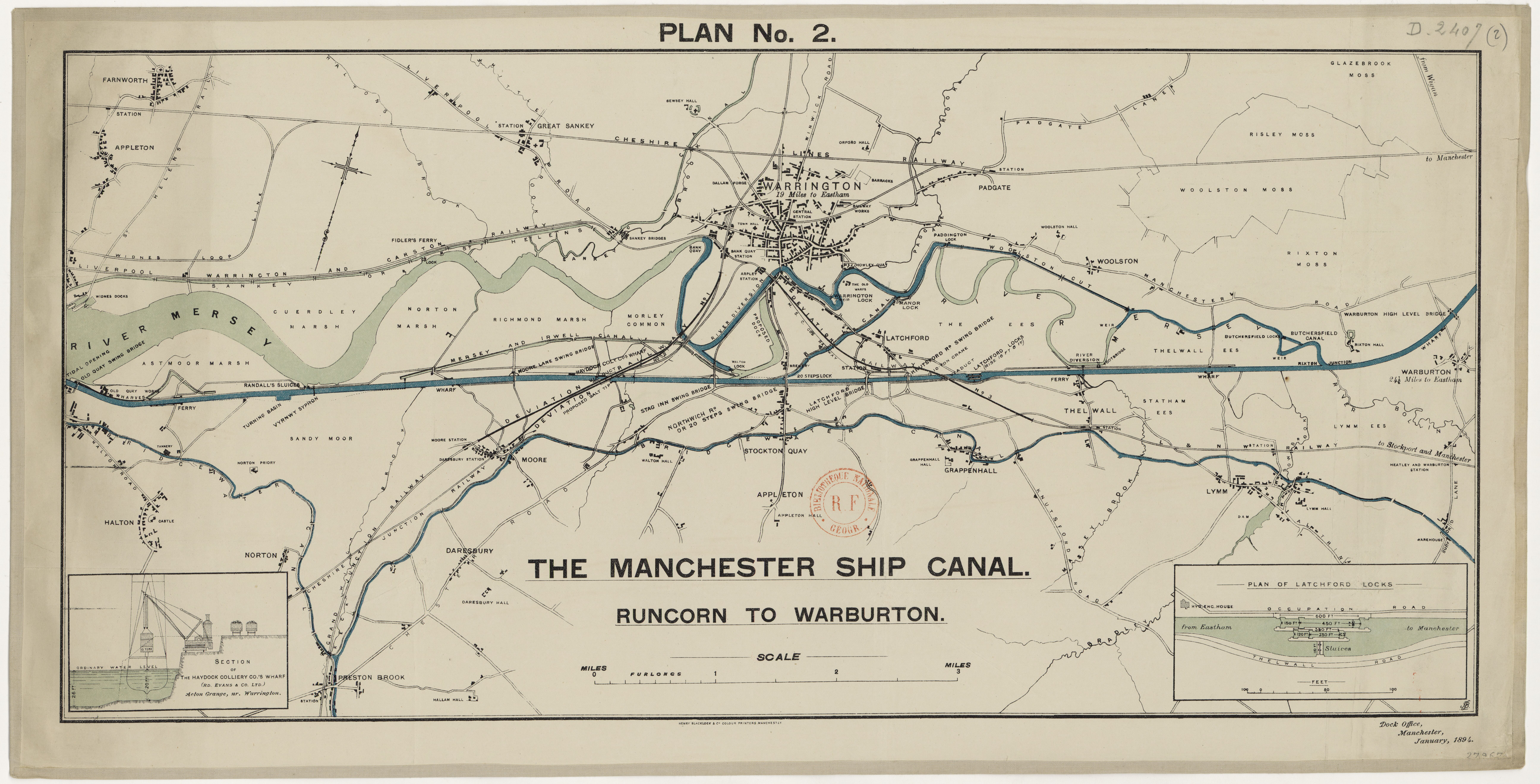
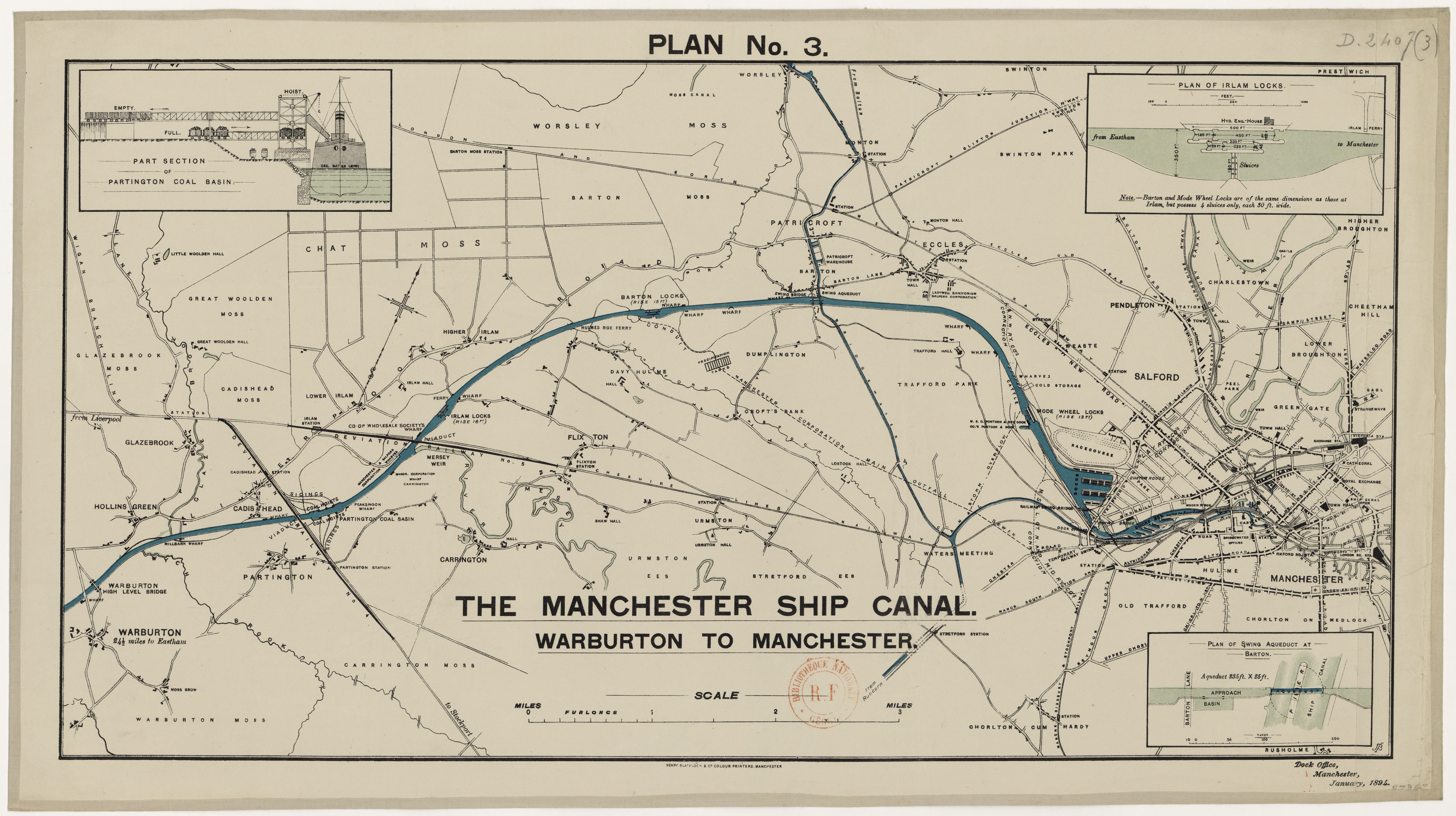
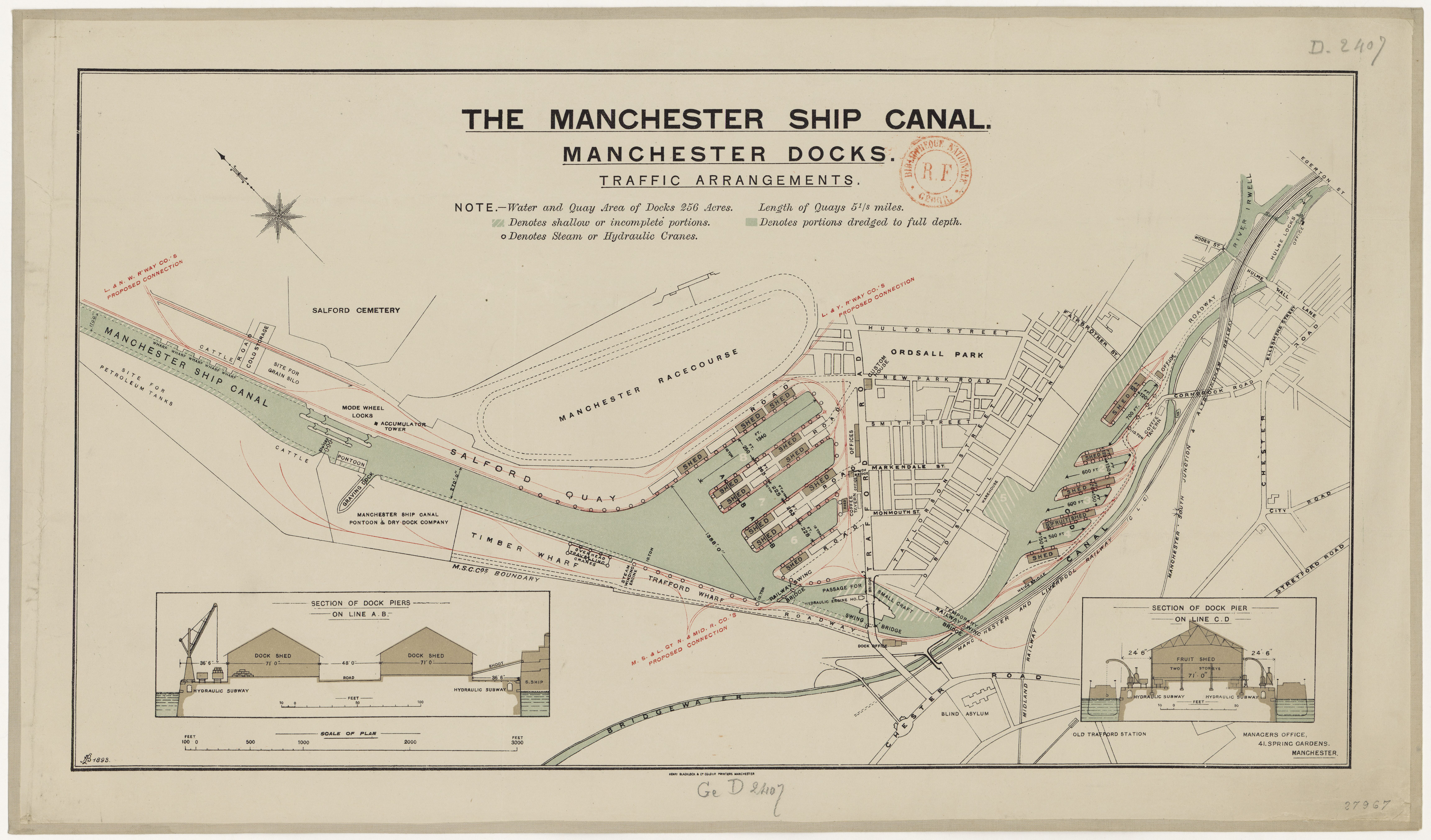
The complete route and docks of the canal in 1894

=== Construction ===
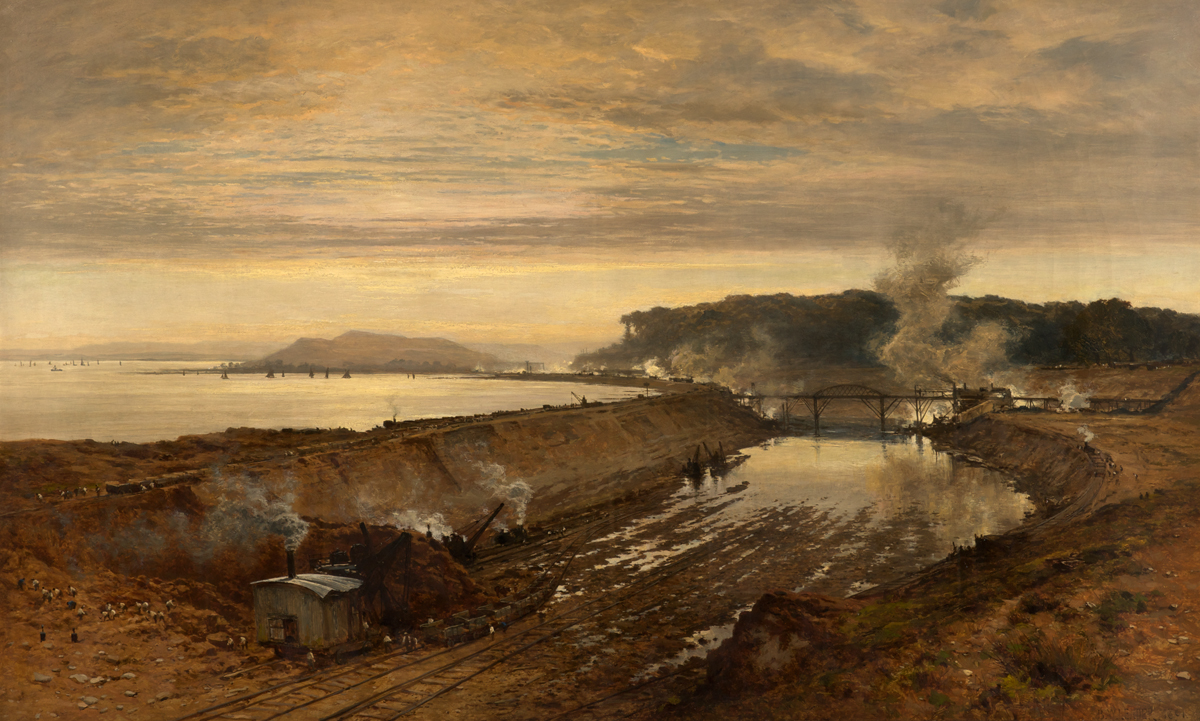
The Excavation of the Manchester Ship Canal: Eastham Cutting with Mount Manisty in the Distance (1891), by Benjamin Williams Leader, brother of the canal's engineer Edward Leader Williams

Thomas Walker was appointed as a contractor, with Edward Williams as chief engineer and designer and general manager. The 36-mile (58 km) route was divided into eight sections, with one engineer responsible for each. The first reached from Eastham to Ellesmere Port. Mount Manisty, a large mound of earth on a narrow stretch between the canal and the Mersey northwest of Ellesmere Port, was constructed from soil taken from the excavations. It and the adjacent Manisty Cutting were named after the engineer in charge. The last section built was the passage from Weston Point through the Runcorn Gap to Norton; the existing docks at Runcorn and Weston had to be kept operational until they could be connected to the completed western sections of the ship canal.

For the first two years construction went according to plan, but Walker died on 25 November 1889. The work was continued by his executors, but the project suffered setbacks and was hampered by harsh weather and several serious floods. In January 1891, when the project had been expected to have been completed, a severe winter added to the difficulties; the Bridgewater Canal, the company's only source of income, was closed after a fall of ice. The company decided to take over the contracting work and bought all the on-site equipment for £400,000. Some railway companies, whose bridges had to be modified to cross the canal, demanded compensation. The London and North Western Railway and Great Western Railway refused to cooperate, and between them, they demanded about £533,000 for the inconvenience. The Ship Canal Company was unable to demolish the older, low railway bridges until August 1893, when the matter went to arbitration. The railway companies were awarded just over £100,000, a fraction of their combined claims.

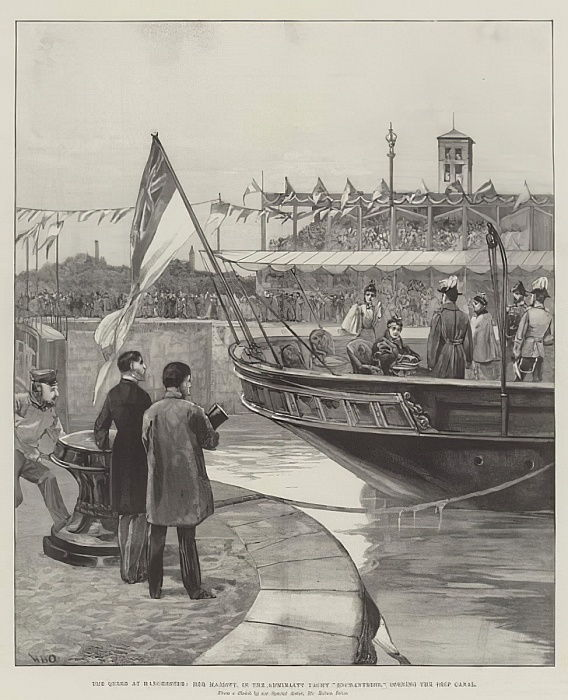
The Queen at Manchester, Her Majesty, in the Admiralty Yacht Enchantress, opening the Ship Canal, by William Heysham Overend

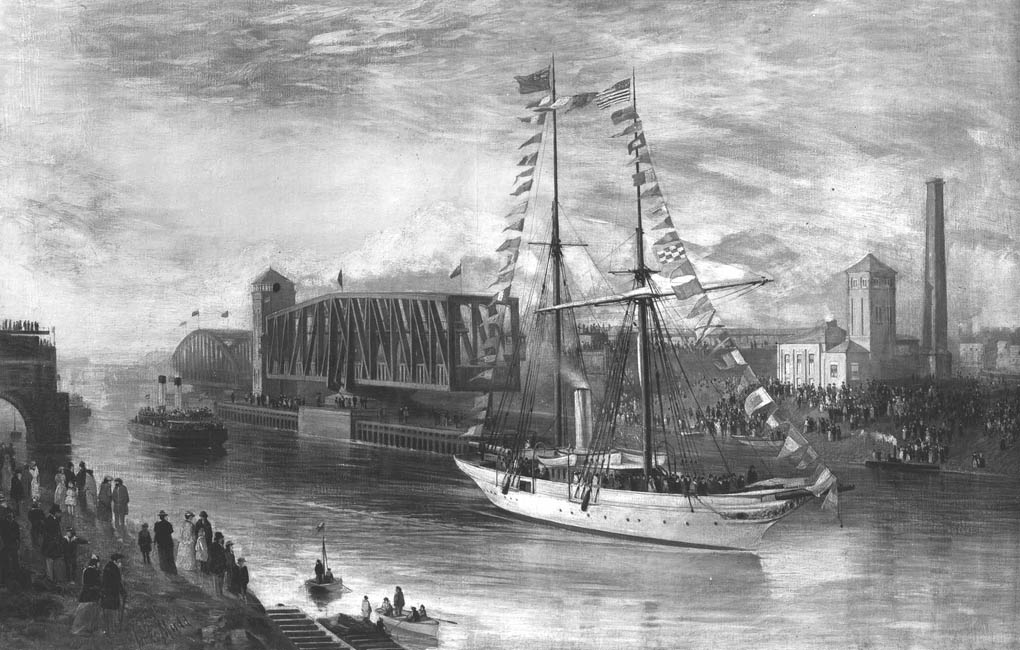
The yacht Norseman (later USS Mohican), carrying the company's directors, headed a convoy of vessels at the canal's opening in January 1894. This picture shows it passing the Barton Swing Aqueduct.

By the end of 1891, the ship canal was open to shipping as far as Saltport – the name given to wharves built at the entrance to the Weaver Navigation. The success of the new port was a source of consternation to merchants in Liverpool, who suddenly found themselves cut out of the trade-in goods such as timber, and a source of encouragement to shipping companies, who began to realise the advantages an inland port would offer. Saltport was rendered useless when the ship canal was completely filled with water in November 1893. The Manchester Ship Canal Police was formed in the following month, and the canal opened to its first traffic on 1 January 1894. On 21 May, Queen Victoria performed the official opening, the last of three royal visits she made to Manchester. During the ceremony she knighted the Mayor of Salford, William Henry Bailey, and the Lord Mayor of Manchester, Anthony Marshall; Edward Leader Williams was knighted on 2 July by letters patent.

The ship canal took six years to complete at a cost of just over £15 million, (equivalent to £1,705,000,000 in 2025). (Note: The method of calculation used is the GDP deflator, the ratio of nominal to real gross domestic product multiplied by 100.) It is still the longest river navigation canal and remains the world's eighth-longest ship canal, only slightly shorter than the Panama Canal in Central America. More than 54 million cubic yards (41,000,000 m³) of material was excavated – about half as much as was removed during the building of the Suez Canal. An average of 12,000 workers were employed during construction, peaking at 17,000. Regular navvies were paid 4 1/2d per hour for a 10-hour working day, equivalent to about £16 per day in 2010. (Note: Comparing relative purchasing power of 3 shillings and 9 pence in 1894 with 2010) In terms of machinery, the project made use of more than 200 miles (320 km) of temporary rail track, 180 locomotives, more than 6000 trucks and wagons, 124 steam-powered cranes, 192 other steam engines, and 97 steam excavators. Major engineering landmarks of the scheme included the Barton Swing Aqueduct, the first swing aqueduct in the world, and a neighbouring swing bridge for road traffic at Barton, both of which are now Grade II* listed structures. In 1909 the canal's depth was increased by 2 feet (0.61 m) to 28 feet (8.5 m), equalling that of the Suez Canal.

=== Operational history ===
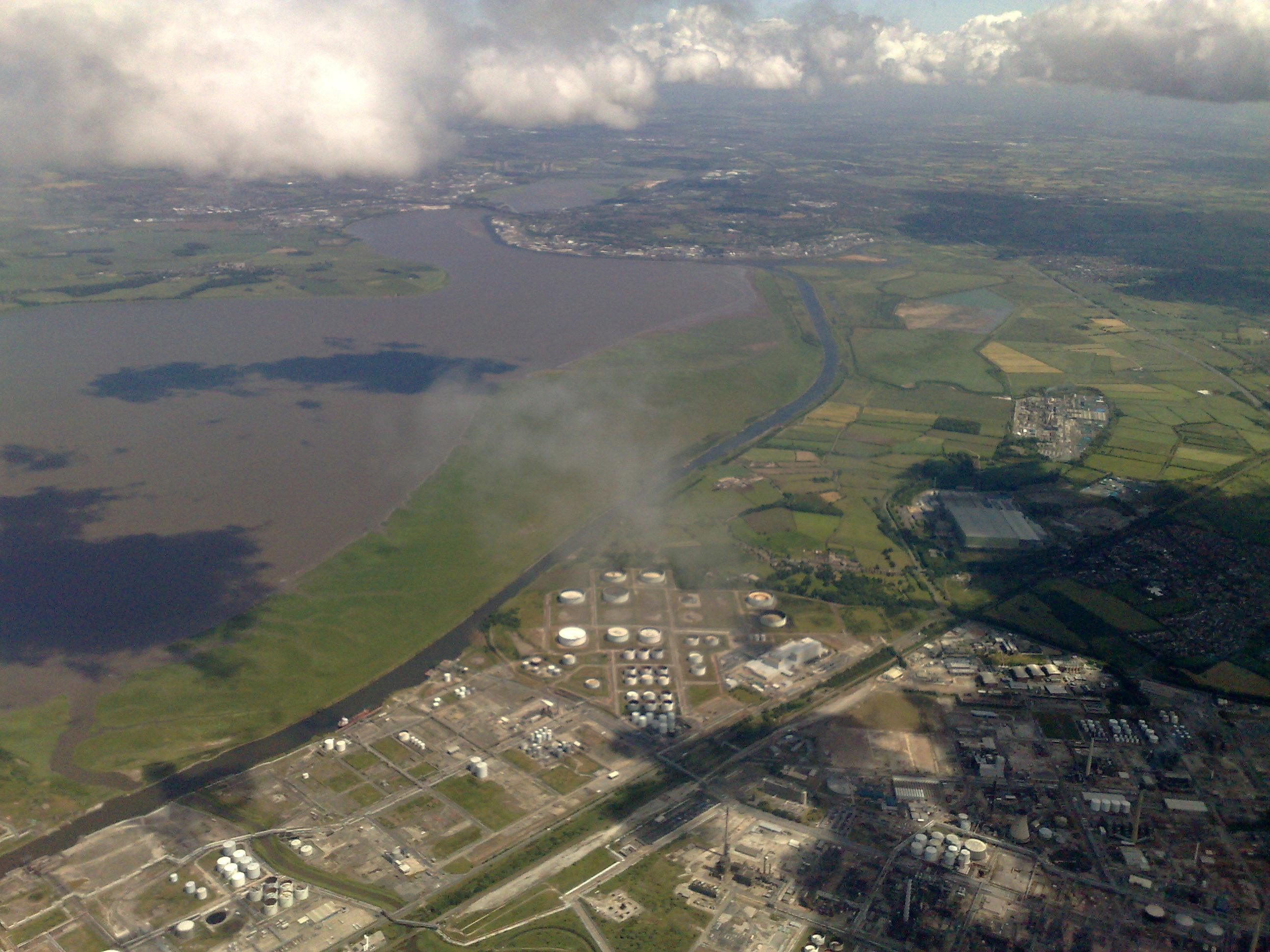
The ship canal alongside the Mersey between Stanlow and Runcorn, looking east

The Manchester Ship Canal enabled the newly created Port of Manchester to become Britain's third-busiest port, despite the city being about 40 miles (64 km) inland. Since its opening in 1894, the canal has handled a wide range of ships and cargos, from coastal vessels to intra-European shipping and intercontinental cargo liners. The first vessel to unload its cargo on the opening day was the Pioneer, belonging to the Co-operative Wholesale Society (CWS), which was also the first vessel registered at Manchester; the CWS operated a weekly service to Rouen.

Manchester Liners established regular sailings by large ocean-going vessels. In late 1898 the Manchester City, at 7,698 gross register tons, became the largest vessel to reach the terminal docks. Carrying cattle and general cargo, it was met by the Lord Mayor of Manchester and a large welcoming crowd. In 1968 Manchester Liners converted its fleet to container vessels only. To service them it built two dedicated container terminals next to No. 9 Dock. The four container vessels commissioned that year, each of 11,898 gross tons, were the largest ever to make regular use of the terminal docks at Salford. In 1974 the canal handled 2.9 million long tons (3.25 million short tons) of dry cargo, 27 per cent of which was carried by Manchester Liners. The dry tonnage was, and is still, greatly supplemented by crude and refined oil products transported in large tanker ships to and from the Queen Elizabeth II Dock at Eastham and the Stanlow Refinery just east of Ellesmere Port, and also in smaller tankers to Runcorn. The limitations imposed by the canal on the maximum size of container vessels meant that by the mid-1970s Manchester Liners was becoming uncompetitive; the company sold its last ship in 1985. Mersey Ferry operates the river cruise along the Manchester Ship Canal.

Tonnage handled by the Manchester Ship Canal ports (Note: All quantities are given in metric tonnes.)
1895	1905	1915	1925	1935	1945
1,358,875	3,060,516	5,434,046	5,881,691	6,135,003	6,531,963
1955	1965	1975	1985	1995	2005
18,563,376	15,715,409	14,816,121	9,767,380	8,751,938	7,261,919

The amount of freight carried by the canal peaked in 1958 at 18 million long tons (20 million short tons), but the increasing size of ocean-going ships and the port's failure to introduce modern freight-handling methods resulted in that headline figure dropping steadily, and the closure of the docks in Salford in 1984. Total freight movements on the ship canal were down to 7.56 million long tons (8.47 million short tons) by 2000, and further reduced to 6.60 million long tons (7.39 million short tons) for the year ending September 2009.

The maximum length of vessel currently accepted is 530 feet (161.5 m) with a beam of 63.5 feet (19.35 m) and a maximum draft of 24 feet (7.3 m). By contrast, the similarly sized Panama Canal, completed a few years after the Manchester Ship Canal, was able to accept ships of up to 950 feet (289.6 m) in length with a beam of 106 feet (32.31 m). Since June 2016, the Panama Canal has been able to handle vessels of 1,201 feet (366 m) in length with a beam of 161 feet (49 m) and a draft of 50 feet (15.2 m), and cargo capacity up to 14,000 twenty-foot equivalent units (TEU). Ships passing under the Runcorn Bridge have a height restriction of 70 feet (21 m) above normal water levels.

== Present day ==
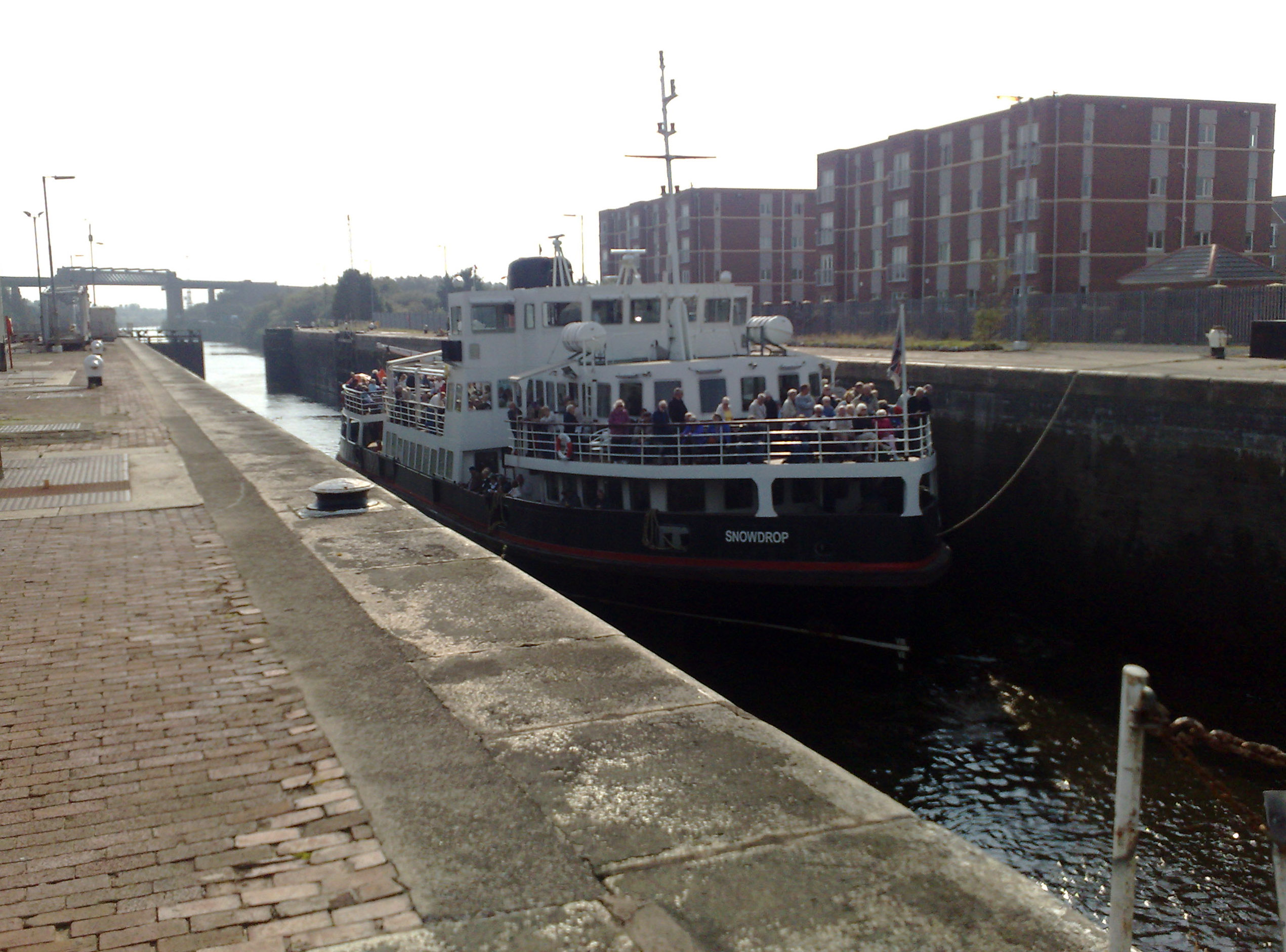
The passenger ferry Snowdrop at Irlam Locks

In 1984 Salford City Council used a derelict land grant to purchase the docks at Salford from the Ship Canal Company, rebranding the area as Salford Quays. Principal developers Urban Waterside began redevelopment work the following year, by which time traffic on the canal's upper reaches had declined to such an extent that its owners considered closing it above Runcorn. In 1993 the Ship Canal Company was acquired by Peel Holdings; as of 2014 it was owned and operated by Peel Ports, which also owns the Port of Liverpool. The company announced a £50 billion Atlantic Gateway plan in 2011 to develop the Port of Liverpool and the Manchester Ship Canal as a way of combating increasing road congestion. Its scheme involves the construction of a large distribution centre to be named Port Salford and an additional six sites along the canal for the loading and unloading of freight. Peel Ports predict that the number of containers transported along the canal could increase from the 8,000 carried in 2010 to 100,000 by 2030.

== Route ==
Route of the Manchester Ship Canal

=== Geography ===
From Eastham, the canal runs parallel to, and along the south side of the Mersey estuary, past Ellesmere Port. Between Rixton (east of the M6 motorway's Thelwall Viaduct) and Irlam, the canal joins the Mersey; thereafter it roughly follows the route the river used to take. At the confluence of the Mersey and Irwell near Irlam, the canal follows the old course of the River Irwell into Manchester.

=== Locks, sluices and weirs ===
Vessels travelling to and from the terminal docks, which are 60 feet (18 m) above sea level, must pass through several locks. Each set has a large lock for ocean-going ships and a smaller, narrower lock for vessels such as tugs and coasters. The entrance locks at Eastham on the Wirral side of the Mersey, which seal off the tidal estuary, are the largest on the canal. The larger lock is 600 feet (180 m) long by 80 feet (24 m) wide; the smaller lock is 350 feet (110 m) by 50 feet (15 m). Four additional sets of locks lie further inland, 600 feet (180 m) long and 65 feet (20 m) wide and 350 feet (110 m) by 45 feet (14 m) for the smaller lock; each has a rise of approximately 15 feet (4.6 m). The locks are at Eastham; Latchford, near Warrington; Irlam; Barton near Eccles and Mode Wheel, Salford.

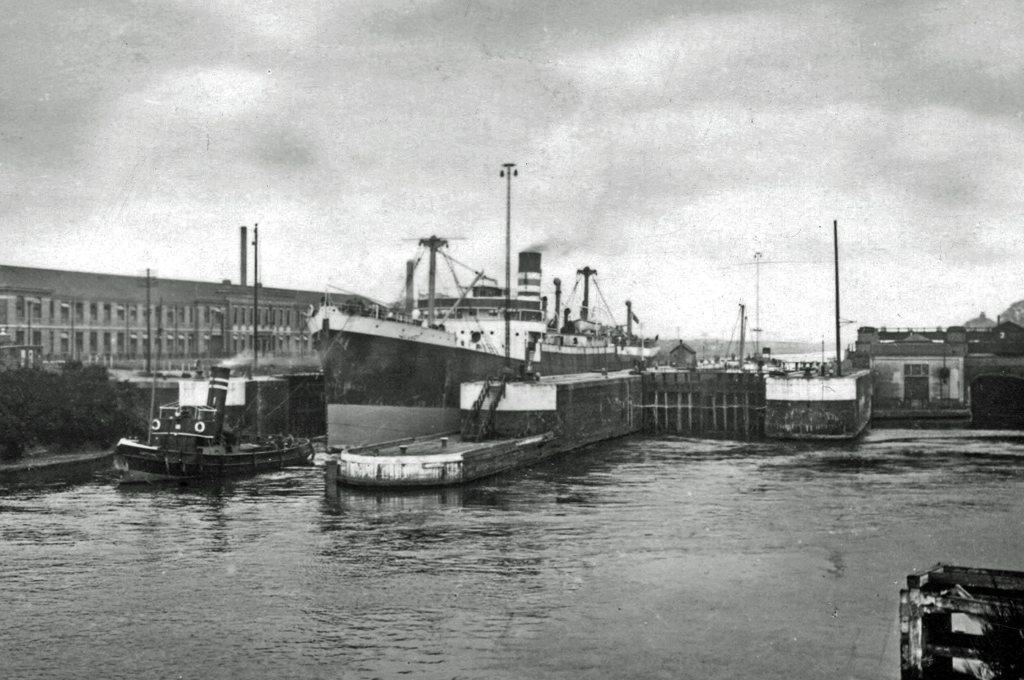
An ocean-going liner passing through Latchford Locks near Warrington, bound for Eastham

Five sets of sluices and two weirs are used to control the canal's depth. The sluices, located at Mode Wheel Locks, Barton Locks, Irlam Locks, Latchford Locks and Weaver Sluices, are designed to allow water entering the canal to flow along its length in a controlled manner. Each consists of a set of mechanically driven vertical steel roller gates, supported by masonry piers. Originally, manually operated Stoney Sluices were used; (Note: A Stoney Sluice gate runs on bearings, reducing the friction caused by the weight of water on the gate.) these were replaced in the 1950s by electrically driven units, with automation technology introduced from the late 1980s. The sluices are protected against damage from drifting vessels by large concrete barriers. Stop logs can be inserted by roving cranes, installed upstream of each sluice; at Weaver Sluices, accessed by boat, this task is performed by a floating crane.

Woolston Siphon Weir, built in 1994 to replace an earlier structure and located on an extant section of the Mersey near Latchford, controls the amount of water in the Latchford Pond by emptying canal water into the Mersey. Howley Weir controls water levels downstream of Woolston Weir. Further upstream, Woolston Guard Weir enables maintenance to be carried out on both.

=== Docks and wharfs ===
Seven terminal docks were constructed for the opening of the canal. Four small docks were located on the south side of the canal near Cornbrook, within the Borough of Stretford: Pomona Docks No. 1, No. 2, No. 3, and No. 4. The three main docks, built primarily for large ocean-going vessels, were in Salford, to the west of Trafford Road on the north bank of the canal, docks No. 6, No. 7, and No. 8. In 1905, No. 9 Dock was completed on the same site. Dock No. 5, known as Ordsall Dock, was part of Pomona Docks, but was dug on the Salford side of the river; it was never completed and was filled in around 1905.

Pomona Docks have also been filled in except for the still intact No. 3 Dock, and are largely derelict. A lock at No. 3 Dock connects it to the nearby Bridgewater Canal at the point where the two canals run in parallel. The western four docks have been converted into the Salford Quays development; ships using the Manchester Ship Canal now dock at various places along the canal side such as Mode Wheel (Salford), Trafford Park, and Ellesmere Port. Most ships have to terminate at Salford Quays, although vessels capable of passing under Trafford Road swing bridge (permanently closed in 1992) can continue up the River Irwell to Hunts Bank, near Manchester Cathedral.

In 1893, the Ship Canal Company sold a parcel of land just east of the Mode Wheel Locks to the newly established Manchester Dry Docks Company. The graving docks were constructed adjacent to the south bank of the canal, and a floating pontoon dock was built nearby. Each of the three graving docks could accommodate ocean-going ships of up to 535 feet (163.1 m) in length and 64 feet (19.5 m) in beam, equivalent to vessels of 8,000 gross register tons. Manchester Liners acquired control of the company in 1974, to ensure the availability of facilities for the repair of its fleet of ships.

=== Trafford Park ===
Two years after the opening of the ship canal, financier Ernest Terah Hooley bought the 1,183-acre (4,790,000 m^{2}) country estate belonging to Sir Humphrey Francis de Trafford for £360,000 (£41.4 million in 2009). Hooley intended to develop the site, which was close to Manchester and at the end of the canal, as an exclusive housing estate, screened by woods from industrial units constructed along the 1.5-mile (2.4 km) frontage onto the canal.

With the predicted traffic for the canal slow to materialise, Hooley and Marshall Stevens (the general manager of the Ship Canal Company) came to see the benefits that the industrial development of Trafford Park could offer to both the ship canal and the estate. In January 1897 Stevens became the managing director of Trafford Park Estates, where he remained until 1930, latterly as its joint chairman and managing director.

Within five years Trafford Park, Europe's largest industrial estate, was home to forty firms. The earliest structures on the canal side were grain silos; the grain was used for flour and as ballast for ships carrying raw cotton. The wooden silo built opposite No.9 Dock in 1898 (destroyed in the Manchester Blitz in 1940) was Europe's largest grain elevator. It had a capacity of 40,000 tons and its automatic conveying and spouting system could distribute grain into 226 bins. The CWS bought land on Trafford Wharf in 1903, where it opened a bacon factory and a flour mill. In 1906 it bought the Sun Mill, which it extended in 1913 to create the UK's largest flour mill, with its own wharf, elevators and silos.

Inland from the canal, the British Westinghouse Electric Company bought 11 per cent of the estate. Westinghouse's British architect Charles Henry Heathcote was responsible for much of the planning and design of the company's factory, which built steam turbines and turbo generators. By 1899 Heathcote had also designed fifteen warehouses for the Manchester Ship Canal Company.

=== Manchester Ship Canal Railway ===
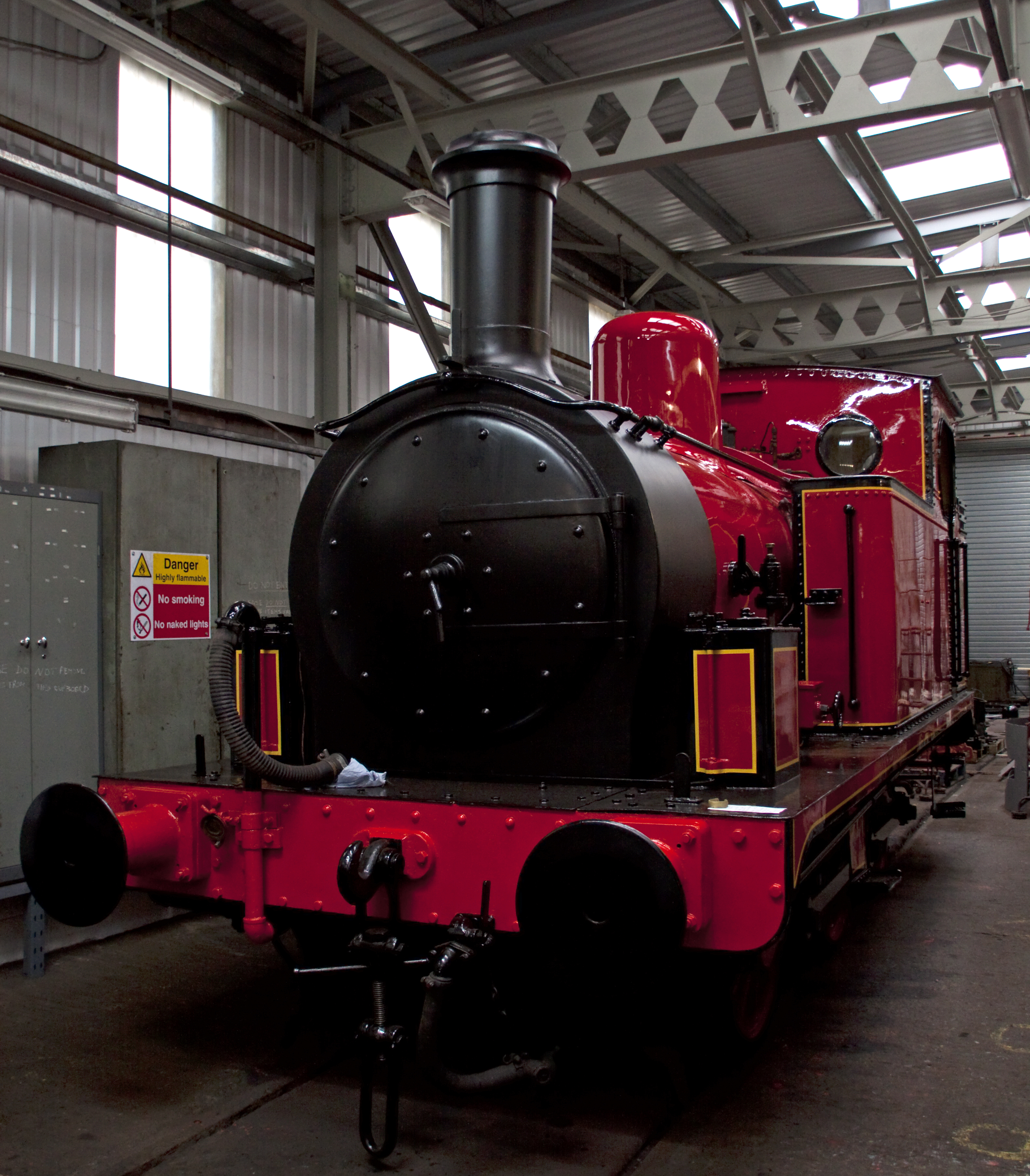
A preserved Manchester Ship Canal Railway 0-6-0T locomotive, now on display at The Engine House in Highley

During construction, a year after the death of Walker, the directors of the canal company and Walker's trustees came to an agreement for the canal company to take ownership of the construction assets. These included the more than 200 miles (320 km) of temporary rail track, 180 locomotives and more than 6,000 trucks and wagons. These formed the basis of the Manchester Ship Canal Railway, which became the largest private railway in the United Kingdom.

The construction railway followed the route of the former River Irwell. To bring in construction materials, the construction railway had a connection to the Cheshire Lines Committee (CLC) east of Irlam railway station. Every month this allowed more than 10,000 tons of coal and 8,000 tons of cement to be delivered to sites along the canal excavation. All existing railway companies with lines along the route had been given notice that their lines had to either be abandoned by a given date or raised to give a minimum of 75 feet (23 m) clearance with all deviation construction costs to be paid by the MSC. The CLC Glazebrook to Woodley mainline passed over the River Mersey at Cadishead and so they decided to build a deviation. Construction of the Cadishead Viaduct began in 1892, approached via earth banks, with two brick arches accessing a multi-lattice iron girder centre span of 120 feet (37 m) in length. It opened to freight on 27 February 1893 and to passenger traffic on 29 May 1893. Following the withdrawal of passenger services in 1964, the line became freight only. When expensive repairs to the viaduct were needed in the early 1980s British Rail opted to close it, together with the line to Glazebrook.

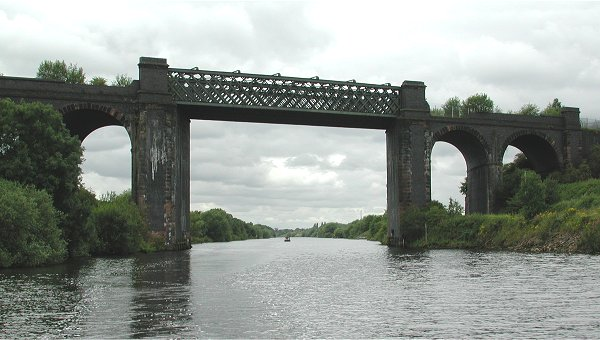
The disused Cadishead Viaduct, built in 1892 to take the Cheshire Lines Committee's existing Glazebrook to Woodley mainline over the MSC at the required 75 feet (23 m) clearance

At the end of construction, the canal company left in place the original construction railway route, and eventually developed track along 33 miles (53 km) of the canal's length, mainly to its north bank. Built and operated mainly as a single-track line, the busiest section from Weaste Junction through Barton and Irlam, to Partington was all double-tracked. The railway's access to Trafford Park was over the double-tracked Detroit Swing Bridge, which after closure of the MSC Railway in 1988 was floated down the canal to be placed in Salford Quays. The only major deviation was to allow construction of the CWS Irlam soap works and the adjacent Partington Steel & Iron Co. works at Partington (both of which had their own private railways and locomotives), with the MSC Railway's deviation route pushed south to run alongside the canal's north bank and under the Irlam viaduct. The canal company also developed large complexes of sidings along the route, built to service freight to and from the canal's docks and nearby industrial estates, especially at: Salford Docks; Trafford Park; Partington North Coaling Basin (both sides of the canal); Glazebrook sidings; and a small but busy marshalling yard east of Irlam locks. Unlike most other railway companies in the UK, it was not nationalised in 1948. At its peak it had 790 employees, 75 locomotives, 2,700 wagons and more than 230 miles (370 km) of track.

The MSC Railway was able to receive and despatch goods trains to and from all the UK's mainline railway systems, using connecting junctions at three points in the terminal docks. Two were to the north of the canal, operated by the Lancashire and Yorkshire Railway and the London and North Western Railway. The third was to the south, operated by the Cheshire Lines Committee (CLC), whereby the MSC Railway had taken over the old and abandoned route of the CLC, giving them a monopoly on traffic to the new soap works and steel mill.

The MSC Railway's steam locomotives were designed to negotiate the tight curves of the sidings and industrial tracks on which they ran. Originally, 0-4-0 wheel arrangements were specified; later 0-6-0 locomotives – purchased to cope with increasing traffic and loads – had flangeless centre axles, while the coupling rods had a hinged central section that permitted several inches of lateral play. The MSC Railway was a long-time customer of Hudswell Clarke, purchasing a range of their steam and diesel locomotives. Later, like many industrial railways, the company purchased refurbished locomotives operated by the former 'Big Four' railway companies, with the advantage that crew were readily available to operate them. Post–Second World War purchases included several war-surplus Hunslet 'Austerity' 0-6-0 saddle tanks; the last steam locomotive types purchased for the MSC Railway. A fleet of diesel locomotives was bought between 1959 and 1966, including 18 0-4-0 diesels from the Rolls-Royce-owned Sentinel Waggon Works from 1964 to 1966. These enabled the MSC Railway to complete its conversion from steam on 6 July 1966, more than two years before British Railways did so.

However, as transshipment costs increased, and unprocessed bulk cargoes decreased in volume, the economics of road transport resulted in a gradual dwindling of traffic on the MSC Railway system, and hence contraction in the MSC Railway itself. Traffic was further reduced by the 1969 closure of the CWS Irlam soap works, the post-nationalisation British Steel Corporation building its own line to Glazebrook to a junction with BR; and severe reductions in traffic of ICI's soda ash trains, British Tar Products and reduced domestic coal consumption. With the remaining engines stationed at Ellesmere Port and Stanlow, maintenance on the line from Irlam through to Partington was halted in late 1977, and all through traffic except engineering trains stopped on 21 December. The through line was officially closed to all traffic in 1978, but many of the sidings complexes remained; the last operational section of the MSC Railway, at Trafford Park, closed on 30 April 2009.

=== Other features on the banks ===
At Ellesmere Port the canal is joined by the Shropshire Union Canal, at a site now occupied by the National Waterways Museum. The area formerly consisted of a 7-acre (2.8 ha) canal port linking the Shropshire Union Canal to the River Mersey. Designed by Thomas Telford, it remained operational until the 1950s. It was a "marvellously self-contained world" with locks, docks, warehouses, a blacksmith's forge, stables, and cottages for the workers. Its Island Warehouse was built in 1871 to store grain. A few miles from Ellesmere Port, at Weston Point, near Runcorn, the ship canal also connects with the Weaver Navigation.

== Crossings ==
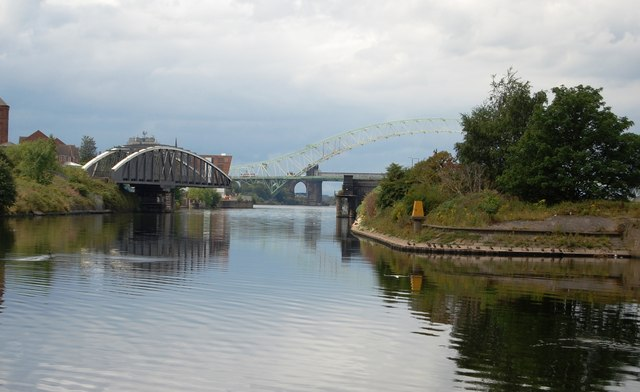
Approaching the Silver Jubilee Bridge in Runcorn

Significant crossings of the Canal include:

- Runcorn Railway Bridge
- Silver Jubilee Bridge
- Mersey Gateway Bridge
- M6 motorway
- Warburton Toll Bridge
- Hulme Bridge Ferry between Irlam and Flixton
- M60 motorway
- Barton Swing Aqueduct and Barton Road Swing Bridge
- Latchford Viaduct which carried the Warrington and Stockport Railway over the canal until 1985. Since that time it has been closed, but the viaduct (including the lines) remains in situ.

== Ecology ==
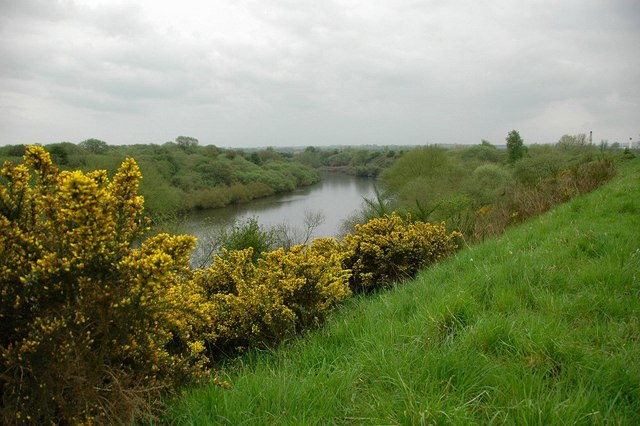
Woolston Eyes nature reserve, near Thelwall

The quality of water in the ship canal is adversely affected by several factors. The high population density of the Mersey Basin has historically placed heavy demands on sewage treatment and disposal. Industrial and agricultural discharges into the Irwell, Medlock, and Irk rivers are responsible for industrial contaminants found in the canal. Matters have improved since 1990, when the National Rivers Authority found the area between Trafford Road Bridge and Mode Wheel Locks to be "grossly polluted". The water was depleted of dissolved oxygen, which in the latter half of the 20th century often resulted in toxic sediments normally present at the bottom of the turning basin in what is now Salford Quays rising to the surface during the summer months, giving the impression of solid ground. Previously, only roach and sticklebacks could be found in the canal's upper levels, and then only during the colder parts of the year, but an oxygenation project implemented at Salford Quays from 2001, together with the gradual reduction of industrial pollutants from the Mersey's tributaries, has encouraged the migration into the canal of fish populations from further upstream. The canal's water quality remains low, with mercury and cadmium in particular present at "extremely high levels". Episodic pollution and a lack of habitat remain problems for wildlife, although in 2005, for the first time in living memory, salmon were observed breeding in the River Goyt (a part of the Mersey's catchment). In 2010 the Environment Agency issued a report concluding that the canal "does not pose a significant barrier to salmon movement or impact on migratory behaviours".

Despite the canal's poor water quality, there are several nature reserves along its banks. Wigg Island, a former brownfield site east of Runcorn, contains a network of public footpaths through newly planted woodlands and meadows. The wildlife includes multiple butterfly and dragonfly species, kestrels, swallows and house martins. Further upstream, the 200-acre (81 ha) Moore Nature Reserve, which is bisected by the de-watered Runcorn to Latchford Canal, comprises lakes, woodland and meadows. The reserve is open to the public and contains a number of bird hides, from which native owls and woodpeckers may be viewed. Near Thelwall, Woolston Eyes (a corruption of the Saxon Ees), is a Site of Special Scientific Interest. It is used as a deposit for canal dredgings and is a habitat for many species of bird, including black-necked grebes, grasshopper warblers, blackcaps and common whitethroats. Great crested newts and adders are present, and local flora includes orchids and broad-leaved helleborines. Diving ducks are regular visitors to Salford Quays, where species such as pochard and tufted ducks feed on winter nights.

== See also ==
- Canals of the United Kingdom
- History of the British canal system
- Waterways in the United Kingdom
- Liverpool–Manchester rivalry, generally considered to result from the construction of the canal
