= Runcorn to Latchford Canal =

Canal in North West England

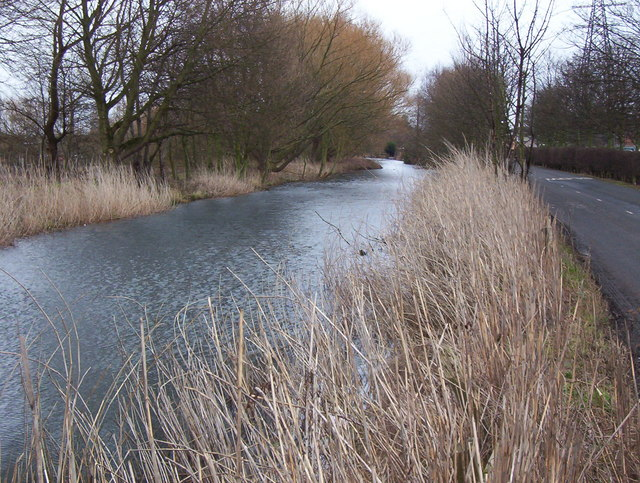
- A small section between Walton Railway Bridges and the A5060 road still holds water.
- Interactive map of Runcorn to Latchford Canal

Specifications
- Maximum boat length: 70 ft 0 in (21.34 m)
- Maximum boat beam: 14 ft 9 in (4.50 m)
- Status: Closed

History
- Original owner: Mersey and Irwell Navigation Company
- Date of act: 1720
- Date of first use: 1804
- Date closed: 1890s

The Runcorn to Latchford Canal (or Old Quay Canal or Old Quay Cut or Black Bear Canal) was a man-made canal that ran from Runcorn, to the Latchford area of Warrington. It connected the Mersey and Irwell Navigation to the River Mersey at Runcorn.

== History ==
The canal was built to bypass the shallow stretches of the Mersey at Fiddlers Ferry. It extended for 7 miles (11 km), ending to the east of Runcorn Gap close to the centre of the township of Runcorn, and cost £48,000. At Latchford, it joined the Mersey at a lock which was located above Howley Weir. At its terminus a dock was built which became part of the Port of Runcorn. The canal was built under powers embodied in the Rivers Mercy and Irwell Navigation Act 1720 (7 Geo. 1. St. 1. c. 15) which permitted new cuts to be made without the necessity of further recourse to Parliament. It opened in July 1804.

Manchester Ship Canal (Black Bear Canal) (Local Enactments) Order 1976
- Statutory Instrument
- Parliament of the United Kingdom
- Citation: SI 1976/1084

Dates
- Made: 7 July 1976
- Laid before Parliament: 16 July 1976
- Commencement: 6 August 1976
Other legislation
Made under	Transport Act 1968

Text of statute as originally enacted

The canal and the Mersey and Irwell Navigation were bought out by the Bridgewater Canal Company in 1844. The new owners invested little in the canal and its condition gradually grew worse. They in turn were bought out by the Manchester Ship Canal Company in the 1890s, who particularly wanted ownership of the Runcorn to Latchford Canal, as the ship canal would use the same course for part of its route. Much of the western end of the canal, including the docks at Runcorn, disappeared when the much larger ship canal was built. The eastern end fared rather better, as the section between Twenty Steps Bridge and Latchford Lock was retained. A new lock, called Twenty Steps Lock, was built where the old canal left the course of the ship canal, and it was used to supply tanneries at Howley with hides which were imported from Argentina, and this trade continued until the 1960s. This section was called the Black Bear Canal, and it ceased to be used after the tanneries closed. It had its navigation rights removed by the Manchester Ship Canal (Black Bear Canal) (Local Enactments) Order 1976 (SI 1976/1084).

The canal as built had a locks at both ends, both of which dropped into the river. As it had no natural water supply, and water was lost every time a boat passed through a lock, a feeder was built from just above Paddington Lock on the Mersey and Irwell Navigation. The water was then carried across the Mersey in an aqueduct, which also acted as a footbridge, and followed the banks of the Mersey to arrive at Latchford Lock. It emptied into the canal just to the south of the lock. When the Black Bear Canal section was created, Twenty Steps Lock also rose from the ship canal, and so the feature was retained. Latchford Lock was usually known as Manor Lock after the construction of the ship canal, as the locks immediately above its junction with the Black Bear Canal were called Latchford Locks.

== Route ==
The route diagram shows the canal as it was in the 1880s, with some later additions, including the points at which the route of the Manchester Ship Canal destroyed the canal, and features such as Twenty Steps Lock, which was built to connect a section of the original canal to the ship canal.

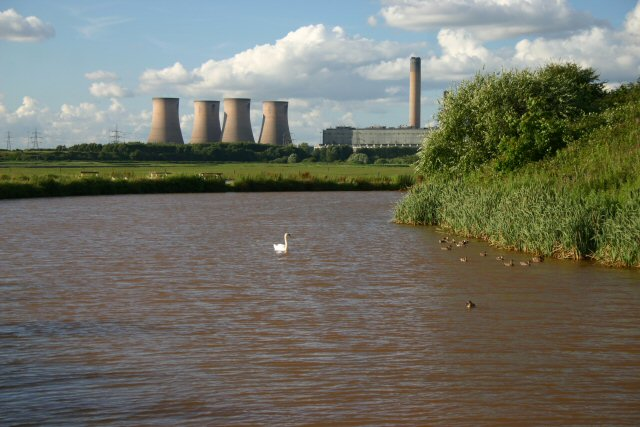
A section of the canal in Wigg Island Park is still in water.

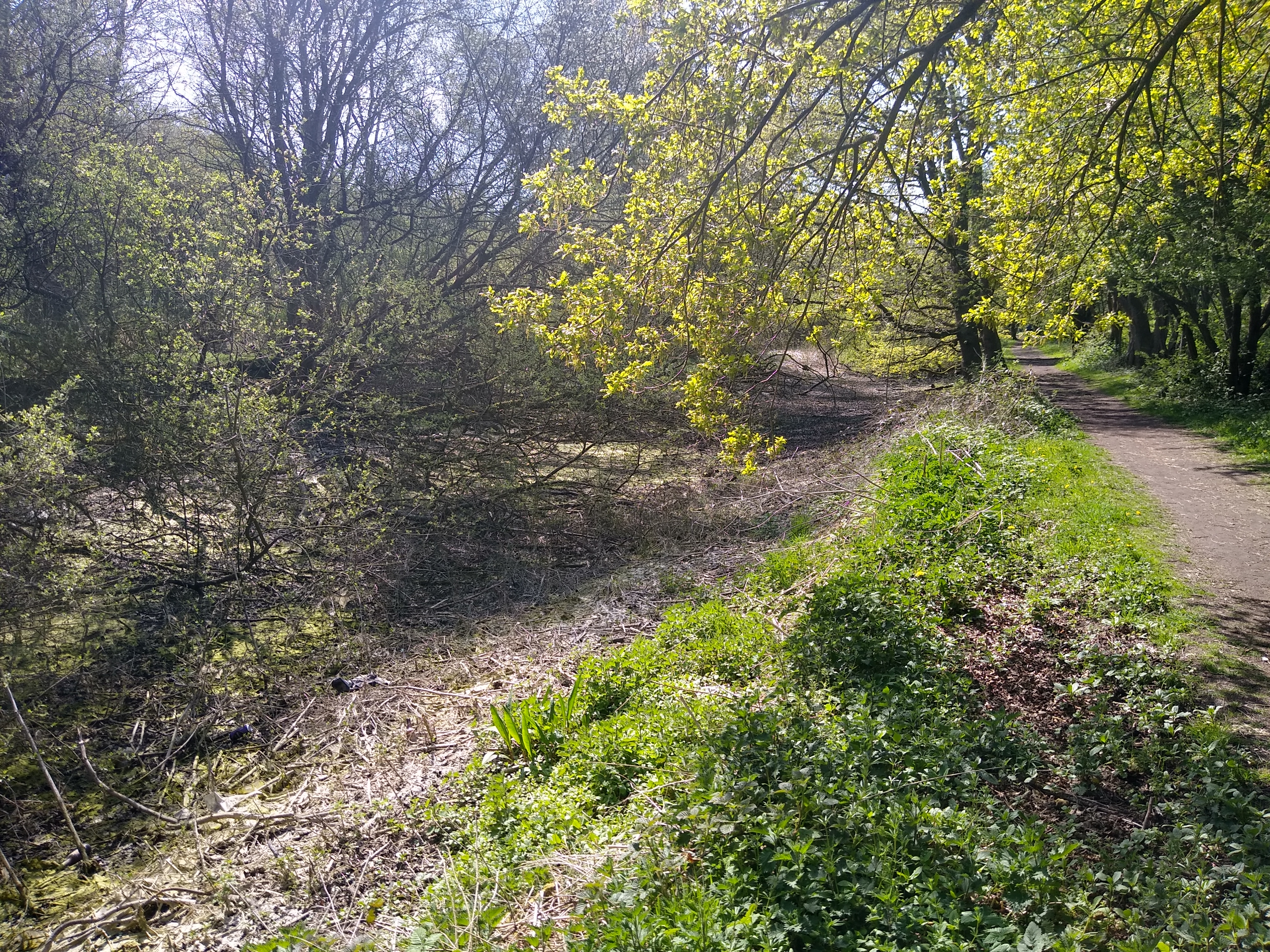
The canal at Moore Nature Reserve

Traces of the canal still exist in Wigg Island and in Moore Nature Reserve. The route of the canal forms the basis of the designated "Linear Park" that runs parallel to the river Mersey at Lower Walton and is clearly visible looking west from Chester Road (A5060) whilst standing on the road bridge over the River Mersey. In the distance is the "Twelve Arches Bridge" where arch number 3 (counted south to north) passes over where the canal would have passed. The largely dried out canal basin can be traced westwards after the bridge towards Moore Nature Reserve and then Runcorn. The canal passes east under the A5060 where it joins the Manchester Ship Canal at Latchford Locks (site of the proposed Port of Warrington). Thereafter it re-emerges in Stockton Heath just past the London Road Swing Bridge (A49) where it runs north-easterly passing under Loushers Lane Bridge until eventually passing under Knutsford Road at the site of the former Black Bear Public House. The course of the canal runs a short distance then to terminate and re-join the River Mersey close to Kingsway North Bridge.

The Wigg Island nature reserve covers 57 acres (23 ha) and was opened in April 2002. It is named after the Wigg Chemical Works, set up in the 1860s to extract copper from ore. The works were used to produce mustard gas in the Second World War, and closed in the 1960s. While the canal was operational, a regular problem was the leaching of highly acidic effluent into the canal. Remediation work to reclaim the brownfield site has included the construction of a filter system which passes the water through a limestone-filled channel. This ensures that the water in the 600-yard (550 m) length of canal which crosses the site is safe and suitable for wildlife.

== See also ==
- Canals of the United Kingdom
- History of the British canal system
