= Barton Bridge =

Barton Bridge or Barton Swing Bridge may refer to two bridges that cross the Manchester Ship Canal, in North West England:

- Barton Swing Aqueduct
- Barton Road Swing Bridge

Barton Bridge may also refer to the high level bridge that spans the Manchester Ship Canal as part of the M60 motorway (formerly the M63 motorway).
