= Barton Road Swing Bridge =

Bridge in Greater Manchester, England

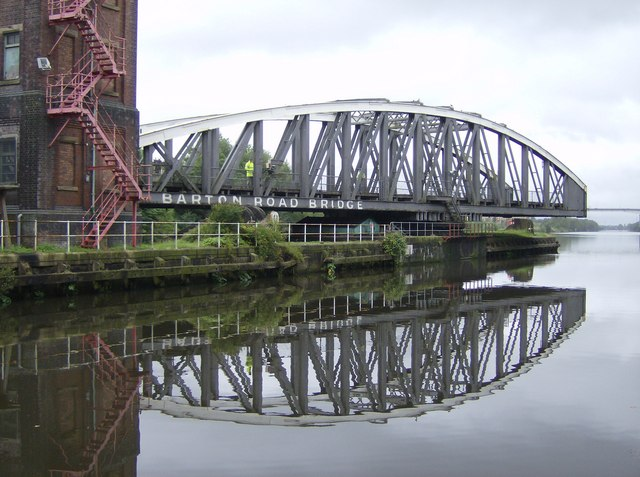
- The bridge in an open position, allowing traffic to pass through the Manchester Ship Canal
- Coordinates: 53.4744°N 2.3533°W
- Carries: Road traffic
- Crosses: Manchester Ship Canal
- Locale: Greater Manchester, England

Characteristics
- Design: Swing truss bridge
- Material: Steel
- Total length: 59.3 metres (195 ft)
- Width: 5.6 metres (18 ft)

History
- Constructed by: Edward Leader Williams (design); Andrew Handyside and Company (construction)
- Opened: 1 January 1894

Listed Building – Grade II*
- Official name: Barton Bridge, Barton Aqueduct and Control Tower
- Designated: 29 June 1987
- Reference no.: 1356522

Barton Road Swing Bridge (or Barton Road Bridge) is a swing bridge for road traffic in Greater Manchester that crosses the Manchester Ship Canal between Trafford Park in the Metropolitan Borough of Trafford to Barton-upon-Irwell in the City of Salford. The bridge is a Grade II* listed building, and is part of a surrounding conservation area. It runs parallel to the Barton Swing Aqueduct which carries the Bridgewater Canal. The bridge opens regularly for traffic along the Manchester Ship Canal, which can cause delays for road traffic.

The bridge and aqueduct were inaugurated along with the Manchester Ship Canal in 1894, though a bridge had previously existed at this location for over 200 years. During the 20th century, it became increasingly important as an access route to Trafford Park and to allow traffic to bypass Manchester and Salford city centres, and consequently became a significant traffic bottleneck. A replacement high level bridge was built further downstream, and today the swing bridge carries mostly local traffic.

== Operation ==
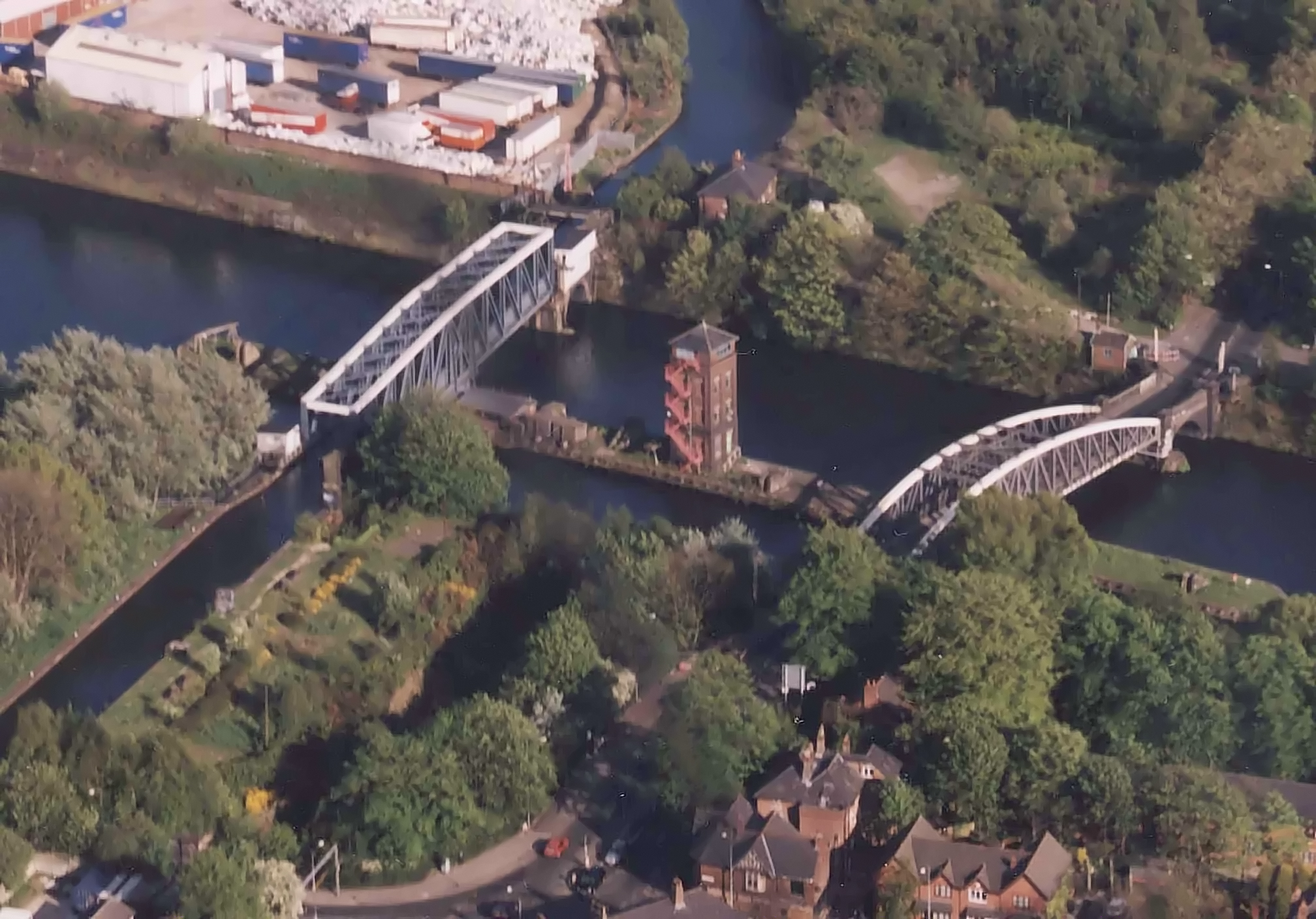
Aerial photo of the bridge (right) and aqueduct (left)

The structure is located adjacent to, and downstream of, the Barton Swing Aqueduct. The two crossings are controlled from a brick-built valve house, on a 122-metre (400 ft) x 9-metre (30 ft) man-made island in the centre of the canal. The tower is four storeys tall, each with a 2x2 bay and accessed via an external staircase.

The bridge opens to let shipping traffic through the Manchester Ship Canal, which occurs up to 14 times a day. The island supports the pivot points for the bridges' rotating structures, which are fixed in concrete. When in their open positions, the aqueduct and road bridge line up along the length of the island, allowing ships to traverse along each side of the ship canal. The bridge is a steel arch of girders, and connects to the pivot point via a rack and pinion system. It is the only swing road bridge on the canal that rotates from the centre, instead of from one end.

== History ==
=== Early crossings ===
There has been a crossing since at least the 17th century at this location, where the road meets the River Irwell. A bridge was constructed over the river around 1677–79, replacing an earlier ford. It was the first river crossing east of Warrington. This bridge was demolished in 1745 in order to stop the progress of the Jacobite army and was replaced by a wooden footbridge, and subsequently a three-arch road bridge. These bridges pre-dated the Barton Aqueduct, and a condition of the aqueduct's design was that it did not impede progress on the Irwell any more than the existing bridge.

=== Current bridge ===
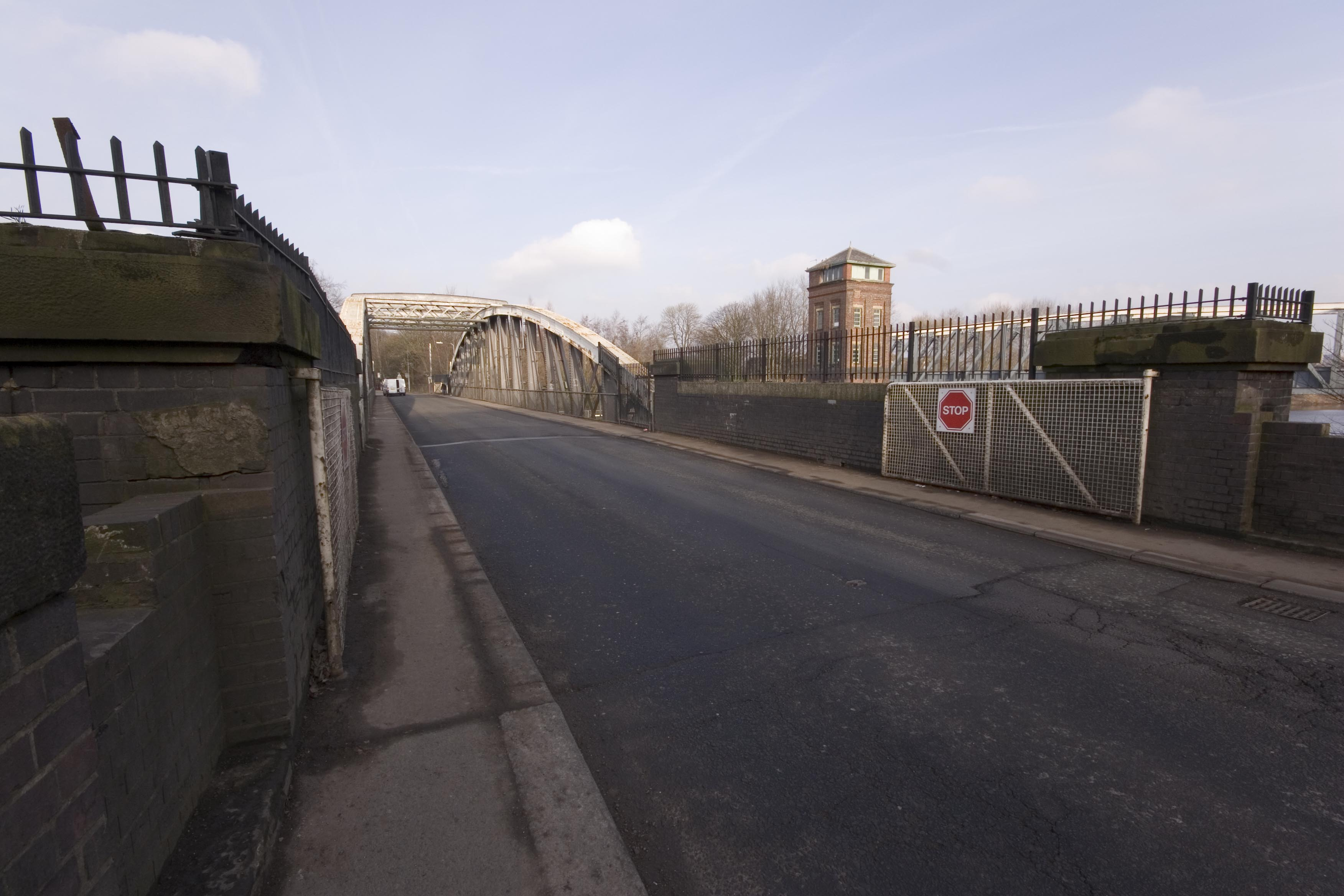
The road crossing

The current bridge was built during the construction of the Manchester Ship Canal. It was designed by the project's engineer, Edward Leader Williams, and constructed by Andrew Handyside and Company. Williams' design was chosen as the best of three possible plans by James Abernethy, who subsequently became the scheme's consulting engineer. The bridge opened to traffic on 1 January 1894. The total span is 59.3 metres (195 ft) and it carries a 5.6-metre (18 ft) roadway.

By the 1930s, the bridge had become a significant bottleneck for workers in Trafford Park, who commuted over the bridge on foot or cycle, particularly during peak hours. It also became an important route for goods vehicles, both heading to Trafford Park and crossing Lancashire, and for parishioners in Eccles travelling to Mass at the All Saints Church on the canal's south side.

In 1946, concern was expressed in Parliament over the closing of the bridge to road traffic at peak times. The following year, the Manchester Ship Canal Company agreed that the bridge would generally stay open for road traffic during rush hour, though this could not be guaranteed. A cargo vessel struck the bridge on 28 December 1948, restricting the bridge to single-line working and a two-ton weight limit until repairs had been completed. In 1953, traffic was banned from turning right off the bridge into Barton Road.

By the 1950s, the bridge had become part of a de facto outer ring road as it formed part of a main road, the A575, from Stretford to Bolton, avoiding both Manchester and Salford. A traffic survey in 1954 revealed 9,600 vehicles were using the bridge daily and it closed 7,000 times a year. A replacement bridge was considered vitally important to the local economy, particularly that of Trafford Park. William Proctor, MP for Eccles, said "I cannot think of any other project in the North of England which should have higher priority than the Barton Bridge scheme." Construction of the replacement Barton High Level Bridge started in 1957; the bridge opened to traffic in October 1960 and has been referred to informally as the "Barton Bridge". Traffic on the swing bridge has also been reduced by the construction of Centenary Bridge located upstream towards Salford.

== Conservation area ==
In 1976, the area around the bridge was designated a conservation area, with responsibility shared between Salford City and Trafford. The bridge and the aqueduct both became Grade II* listed structures. Salford City Council have been concerned about the poor quality of pedestrian access across the bridge, which, as well as being potentially unsafe, detracts from the development of tourism in the area. The council aims to refurbish the area around the bridge and aqueduct so it meets the status of a World Heritage Site.

The council are also concerned about wear and tear on the bridge as, although no longer on a major road, it still carries significant traffic. In August 2008, the bridge was temporarily closed to enable the replacement of electrical supply cabling, while in April, 2013, Salford City Council announced the bridge could be closed for up to six weeks to install pipes to prevent sewer flooding.
