= David Radcliffe (mayor) =

Mayor of Liverpool (1834–1907)

Sir David Radcliffe
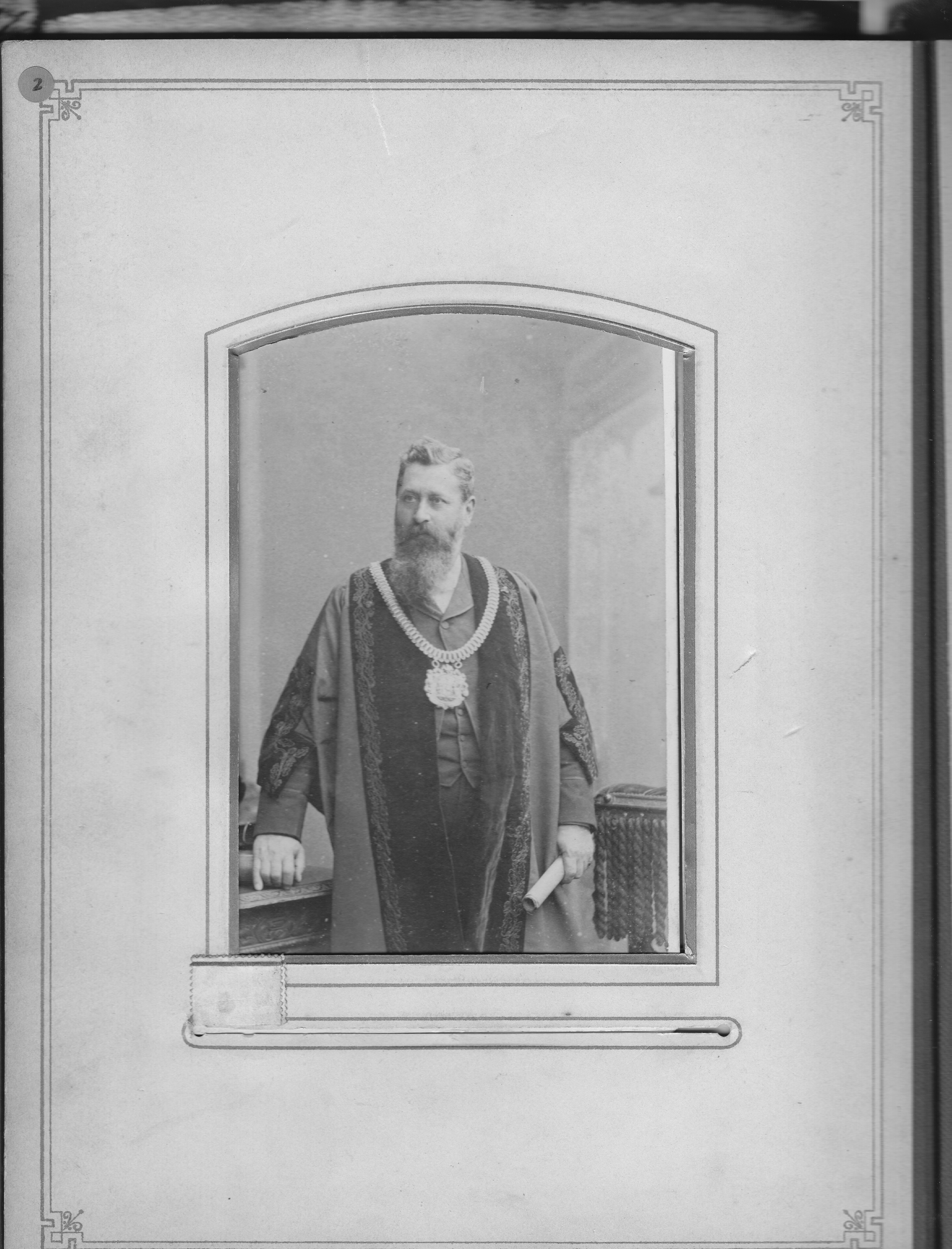
- Born: 8 January 1834; Almondbury
- Died: 10 April 1907 (aged 73); Knowsley
- Burial place: Knowsley Churchyard
- Occupations: Engineer, businessman, magistrate and mayor

Sir David Radcliffe (1834–1907) was mayor of Liverpool from 1884 to 1886. He was a British businessman, magistrate and alderman in the city of Liverpool.

== Early life ==
Radcliffe was born in Almondbury, Yorkshire on 8 January 1834. He was the tenth child of eleven born to his father Amos and his mother Olive Jephson.

== Career ==
Radcliffe trained as a plumber. Initially, he lived at home with his parents and was employed in an engineering business, which he later took over. By 1861 he ran a plumbing business employing ten men and four boys, and by 1871 he was running a plumbing and brass foundry which employed 39 men and 13 boys. From the early 1870s, he became involved in several railway companies, including the Lancashire and Yorkshire Railway, and was chairman of Liverpool United Tramways.

Radcliffe was involved in the Conservative Party, and was elected to the City Council in 1877. He was a director of several companies, including the Ocean Accident and Guarantee Corporation and Andrew Handyside and Co.

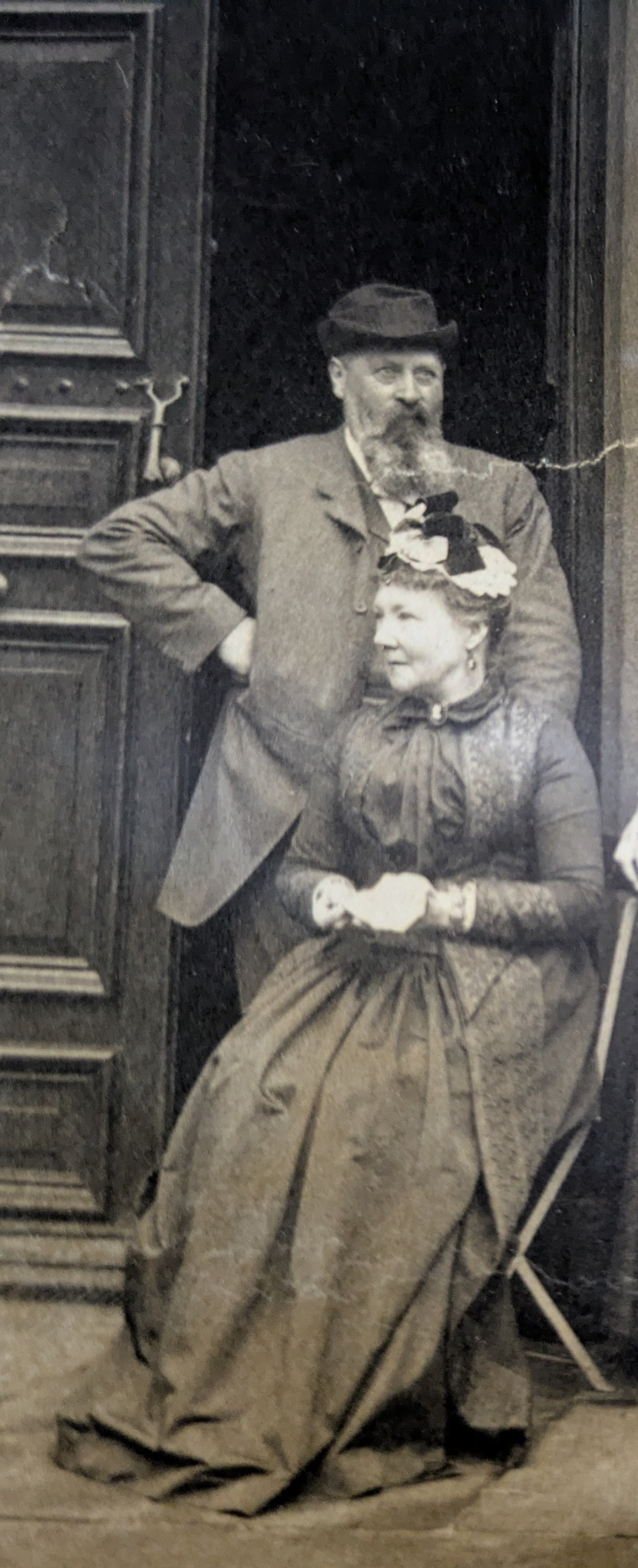
Sir David Radcliffe, mayor of Liverpool, and his wife Lady Mary

== Retirement ==
Radcliffe was a successful entrepreneur. He retired in 1882 and focused on public service. He became a justice of the peace. In 1884, he was elected as an alderman of the City of Liverpool. Later that year, he was elected as mayor of Liverpool, and again in 1885.

In 1885, he led a deputation to Osborne House, Isle of Wight, and presented Princess Beatrice with a speech congratulating her on her forthcoming marriage. He presented her on behalf of the Corporation of Liverpool with a wedding cake on a silver tray which had four liver birds as part of the decoration.

Radcliffe instigated the 1886 Liverpool Exhibition, and was chairman of the organising committee. He lived at Formby Hall, Formby when he was knighted by Queen Victoria when she opened the Liverpool Exhibition. He was reputed not to have heard Queen Victoria's first request that he should kneel at Lime Street Station in order that she could knight him.

Radcliffe also started a scheme to give 1000 hot pots to 1000 poor families at Christmas. Each meal contained 7 lbs of potatoes and 3 lbs of meat.

== Family life ==
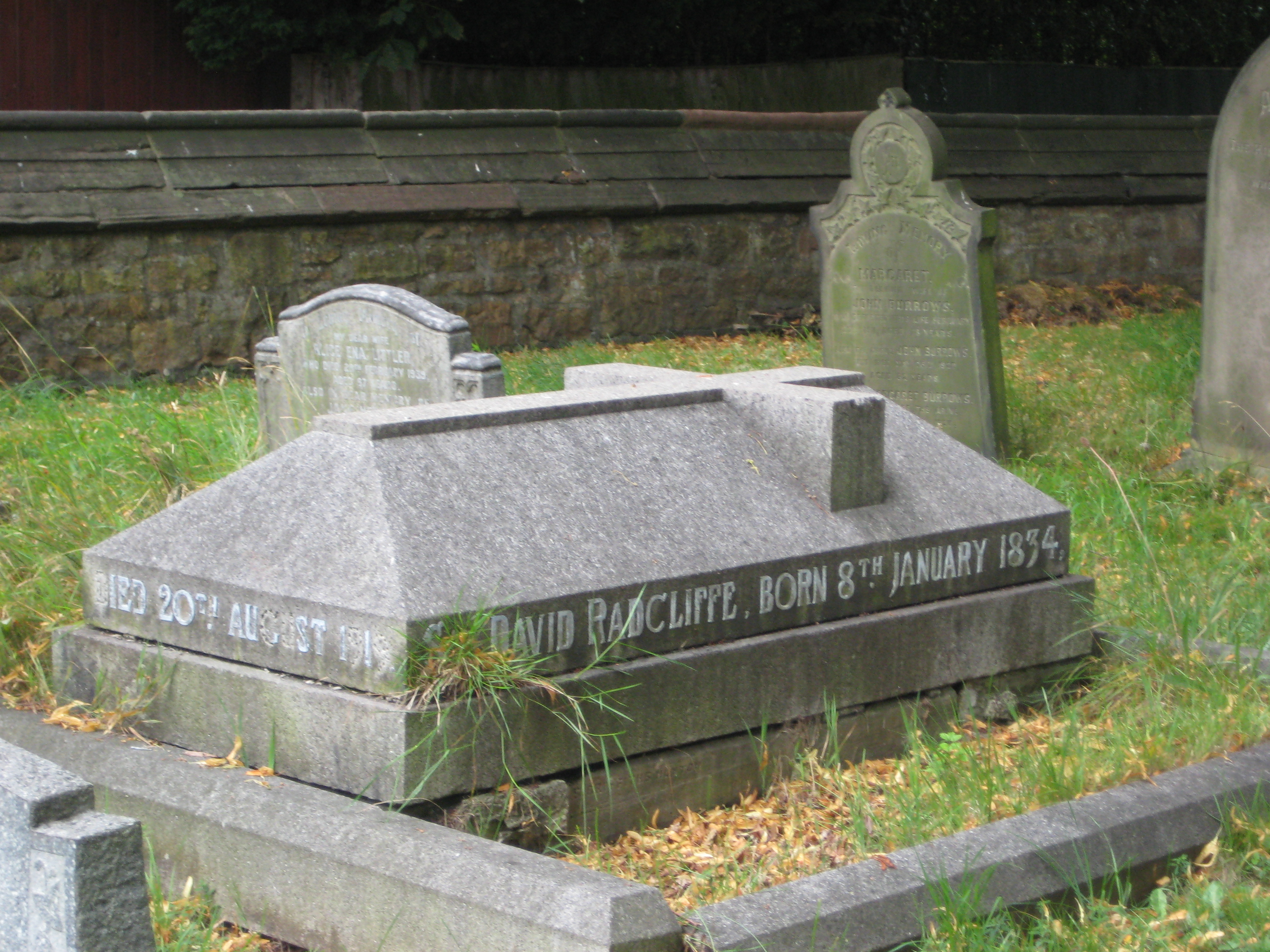
Radcliffe's grave

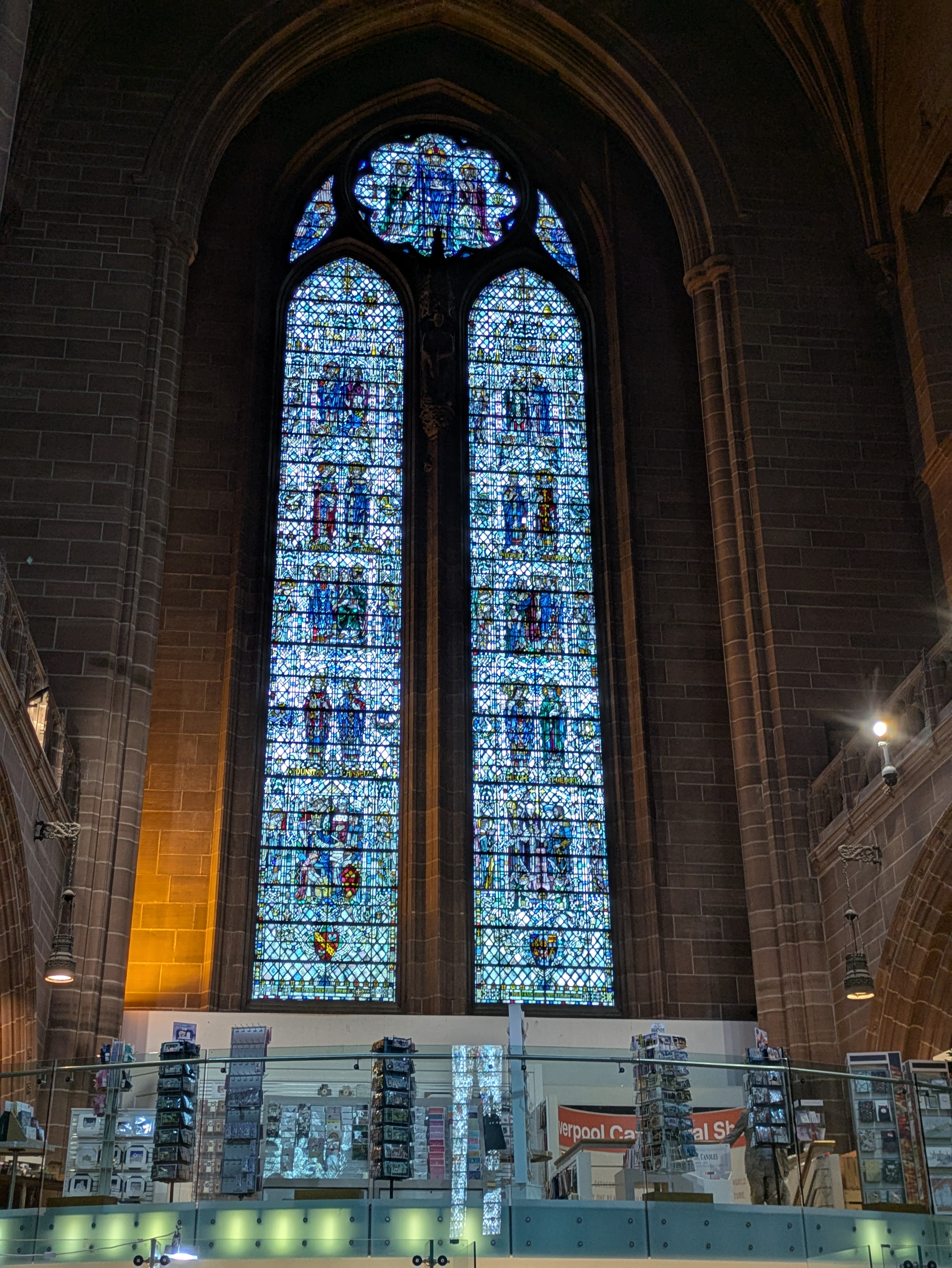
Memorial window to David Radcliffe and his grandfather Sir David Radcliffe

Radcliffe married Mary Elizabeth Clark, daughter of George Clark, a builder of Wootton Wawen, Warwickshire, on 24 April 1860 at the Parish Church in Wooten Wawen, near Stratford upon Avon. They had eight children: six sons and two daughters. Five sons survived to adulthood, including Sir Frederick Morton Radcliffe, a lawyer who was chair of the building works for the new Anglican Liverpool Cathedral, and Harry Sydney Radcliffe, who became archdeacon of Lynn.

== Death ==
Radcliffe died aged 73 at the family home, Rose Bank in Knowsley, Liverpool. He was buried at St Mary's Church, Knowlsey a few days later. He left his estate worth £65,000 to his three sons, Harry, Frederick and David.

One of his grandsons, David Radcliffe, was killed at Arras in the First World War, and grandson and grandfather are memorialised in a window in Liverpool Cathedral.

== Honours ==
- 1886 - Knight Bachelor
