= Koshiji Bridge =

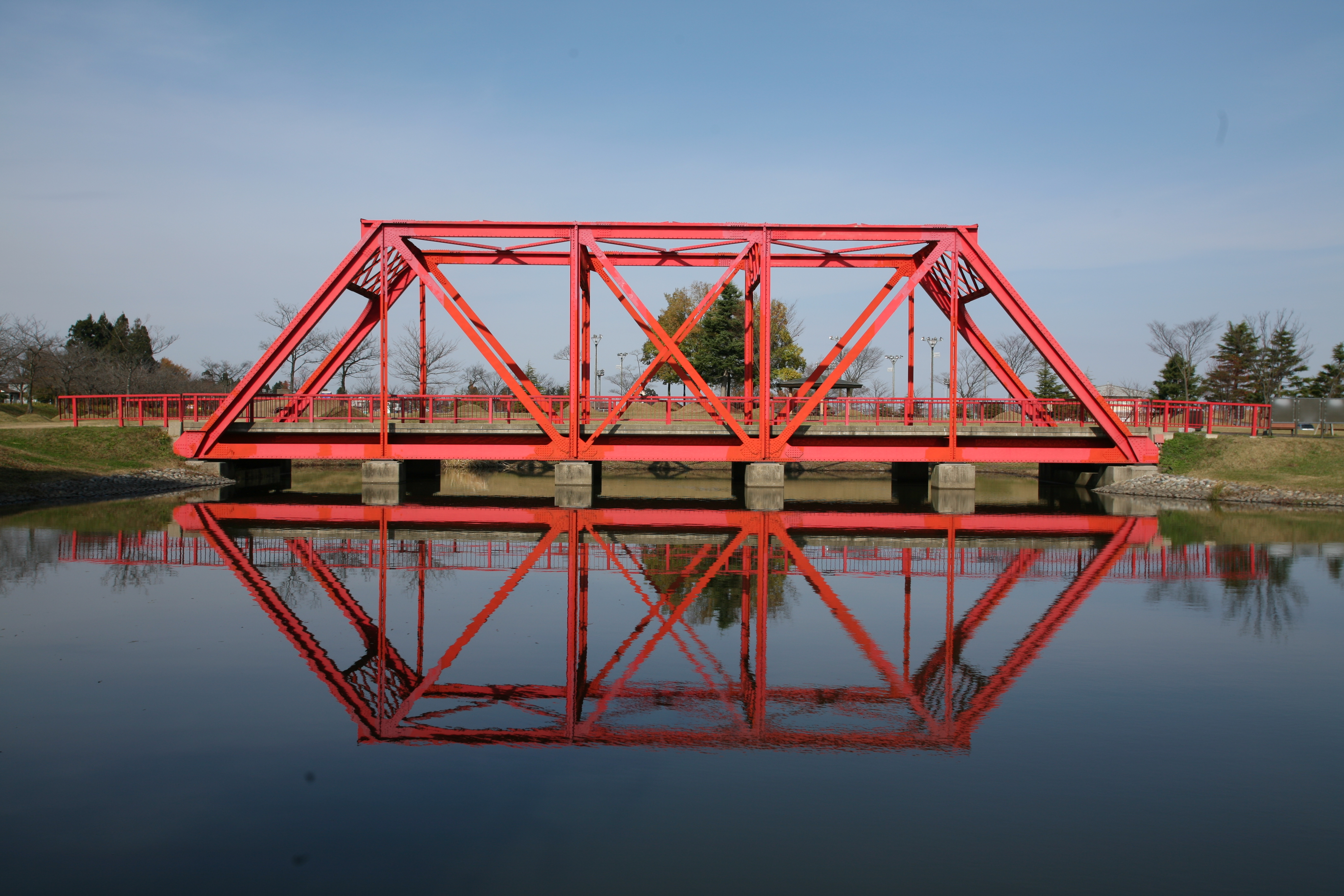
- The old bridge (partly preserved)
- Coordinates: 37°23′36″N 138°48′43″E
- Carries: Kashiwazaki Takahama Horinouchi Road No. 23
- Crosses: Shinano River
- Other name: Koshuji Bashi Bridge
- Heritage status: previous bridge preserved

Characteristics
- Longest span: 596m

History
- Opened: 1998

Statistics
- Daily traffic: road
- Toll: yes

Location
- Interactive map of Koshiji Bridge

The Koshiji Bridge (越路橋, Koshiji-bashi) carries Japanese Kashiwazaki Takahama Horinouchi Line Road No. 23 in Niigata Prefecture. The bridge replaced others on this site. Possibly the most notable was a bridge originally constructed by Andrew Handyside & Co of Derby. This bridge had been designed as a bridge for the Japanese National Railway in 1896 named Shinanogawa Bridge (信濃川橋梁) and saw good service until 1952. In 1959 it was remodeled to be the Koshiji Bridge as a road bridge. This was eventually made redundant when a bypass was constructed in 1998 and in 2002 the old Handyside bridge was shortened and moved to a park to preserve it.

== History ==
The current bridge was constructed in 1998 and is 596m in length.

The former Koshiji Bridge of Nagaoka City, Niigata Preferature in Japan. The bridge was manufactured by cast iron engineers Andrew Handyside & Co. of Derby as the Japanese National Railway's Shinanogawa Bridge on their Shin-etsu Line. It was remodeled in 1959 and was used as a road bridge (Koshiji-Bashi Bridge). In 1998, it closed and in 2002 it was shortened from eight to three panels and preserved in the Koshiji-bashi park.
