= Frederick Morton Radcliffe =

Founding member of Liverpool Cathedral, England

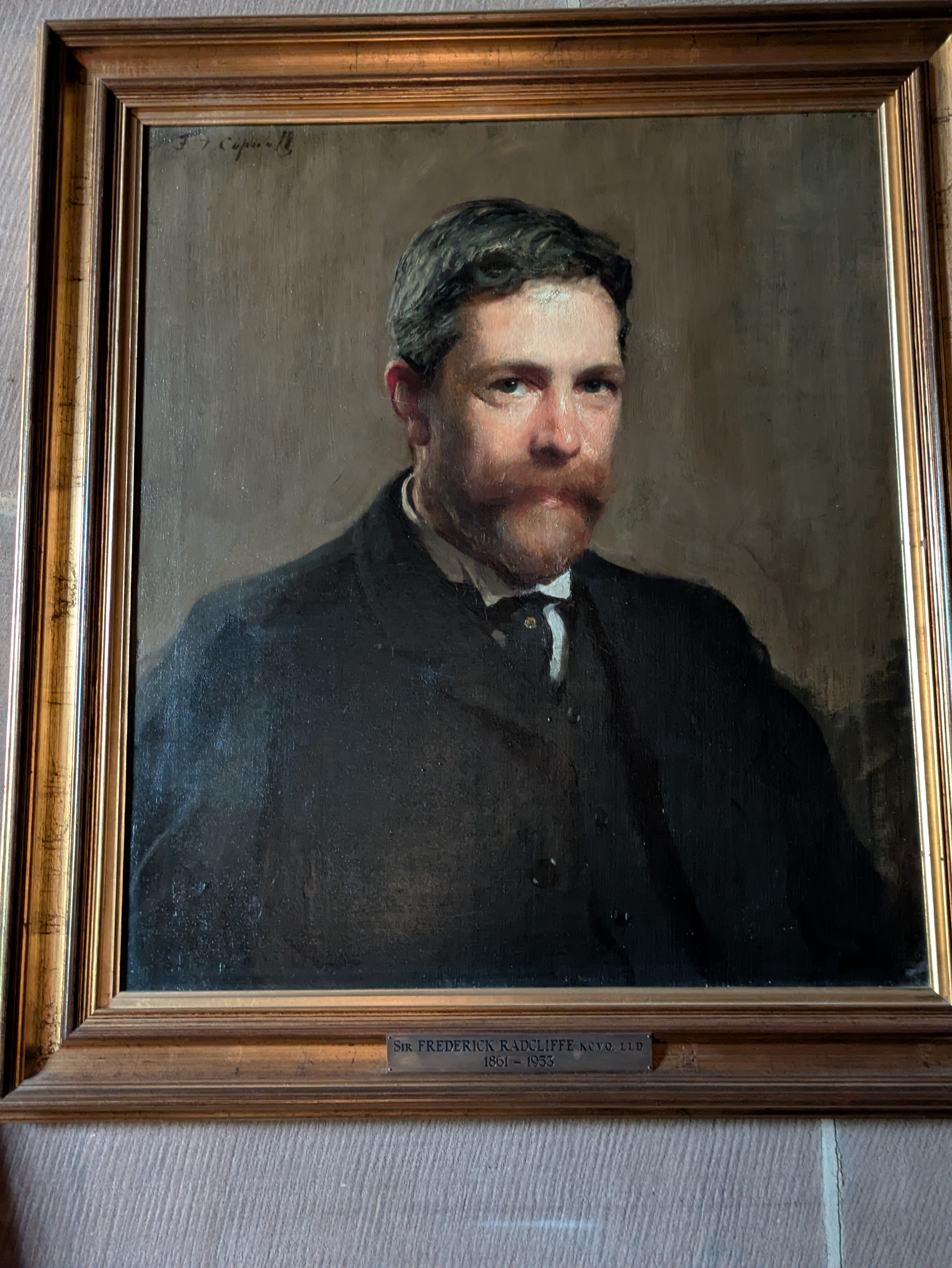
- Born: 16 February 1861; Liverpool, England
- Died: 23 September 1953 (aged 92); Surrey, England
- Burial place: Liverpool Cathedral
- Occupations: Solicitor and chairman of Liverpool Cathedral building works
- Honours: KCB, RVO

Frederick Morton Radcliffe (16 February 1861–23 September 1953) KCB, KCRVO, was a solicitor and founding member of Liverpool Cathedral and also joint honorary treasurer and executive committee chairman between 1913 and 1934. He was a leading figure in Liverpool Cathedral for over 50 years, and was known as the 'Father figure' of the cathedral.

== Early life ==
Radcliffe was born on 16 February 1861 in Liverpool. He was the eldest child of six born to his parents, Sir David Radcliffe, a plumber, who was later Mayor of Liverpool between 1884 and 1886, and his wife Mary Clark. Radcliffe was educated firstly at Beard's Academy, Warwickshire, and then later at the Liverpool Institute and afterwards in Long Eaton, Derbyshire at Trent College.

== Career ==
Initially Radcliffe was a solicitor's clerk and later became partner in a firm of solicitors called Ayrton, Radcliffe and Wright. He retired in 1919. He was made president of Liverpool Institute in 1895, and in 1925 the Sir Frederick Radcliffe Prize for Elocution was established in his name. In 1937 the University of Liverpool conferred on him an honorary Doctor of Laws degree. He was a former chairman of the Church of England's legal board, and between 1919 and 1922 Radcliffe was a member of the Council of Liverpool University.

== Family life ==
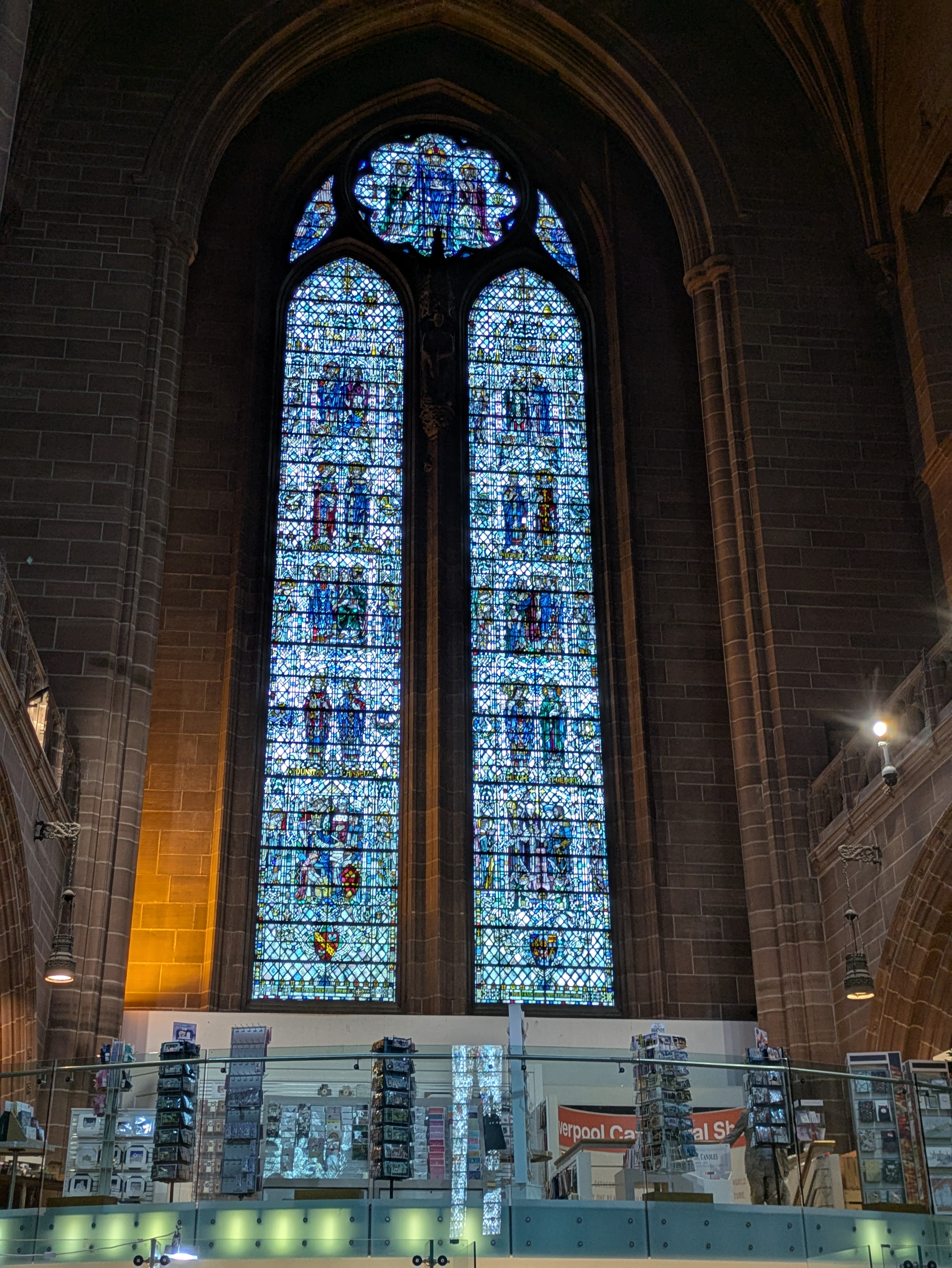
Window above the cathedral shop in memory of David Radcliffe (1895–1916) and Sir David Radcliffe (1834–1907)

He married Margaret (Maggie), daughter of Alfred Horsfall, and Rebecca Miles Horsfall (née Postlethwaite) on 23 April 1885 at St Peter's Parish Church, Formby. They had five children, four daughters, Olive, Margery, Phyllis and Mary, and one son David who was killed whilst serving in World War I at Arras, in France in March 1916. There is a memorial window in Liverpool Anglican Cathedral in memory of David Radcliffe and his grandfather and namesake, Sir David Radcliffe, and former mayor of Liverpool.

== Liverpool Cathedral ==
Radcliffe was involved with the cathedral from its inception. In 1901 he was a founding member of the executive committee and was joint honorary treasurer with Sir Arthur Stanley. Radcliffe succeeded Sir William Bower Forwood as chairman of the committee in 1913, and held the post until he resigned because of ill health in 1934. But he continued to be involved with the building works after he had moved south. Radcliffe supported the selection of Giles Gilbert Scott as architect of the new cathedral. They had family holidays together. In 1924 King George and Queen Mary attended the consecration ceremony of the cathedral and Radcliffe was present in his capacity as chair of the executive committee. Radcliffe was also chair of the stained glass committee, and in 1925 he formed The Builders, the forerunner of the Friends of the cathedral. He donated over 900 liturgical books and manuscripts which were held in the cathedral in the Radcliffe Library, and which are now archived at Liverpool Hope University.

== Retirement ==
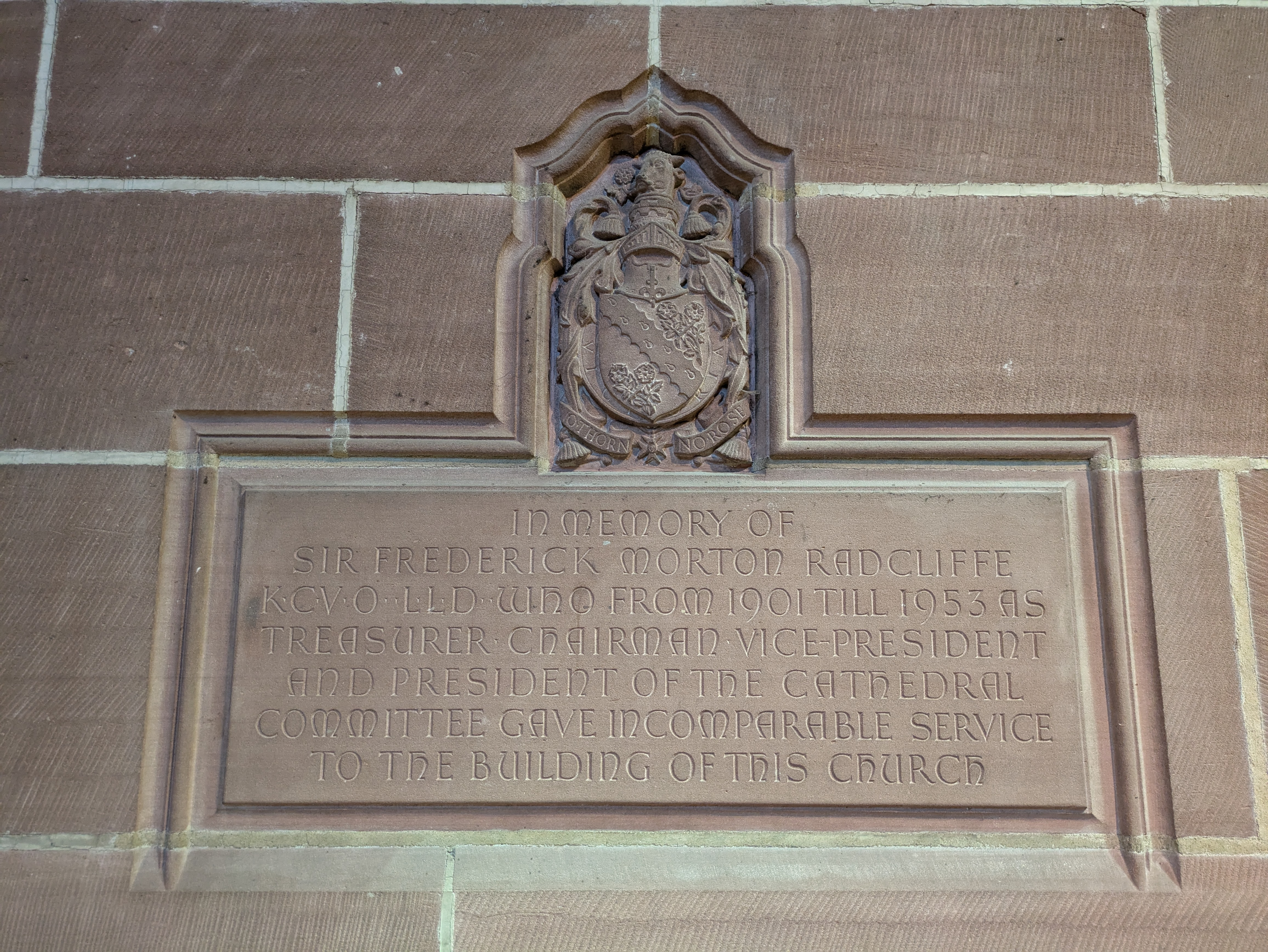
Memorial stone for Frederick Morton Radcliffe in Liverpool Cathedral

After a period of ill health he moved in 1934 he moved with his wife to Tuesley Court (later a convent named Ladywell Court) near Godalming in Surrey, and nearer to one of his daughters and a greatgrandchild. The Arts and Crafts house was designed by Sir Guy Dawber. Radcliffe died on 23 September 1953. A memorial service was held for him in Liverpool Cathedral, and his ashes are interred in the cathederal, along with thoise of his wife Lady Maggie Radcliffe, who died two years later.

== Honours ==
He was knighted by King George V in 1922, and in 1925 was invested as a Knight Commander of the Royal Victorian Order.
