= Andrew Handyside and Company =

Former iron founder company

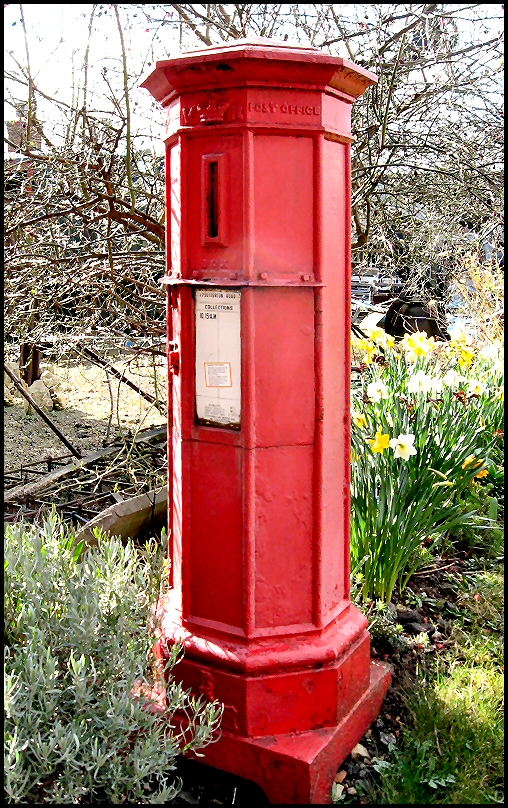
- Company type: Ltd
- Industry: Foundry
- Founded: 1848
- Defunct: 1920s
- Headquarters: Derby
- Key people: Andrew Handyside
- Products: Ornamental cast iron, bridges, structural components

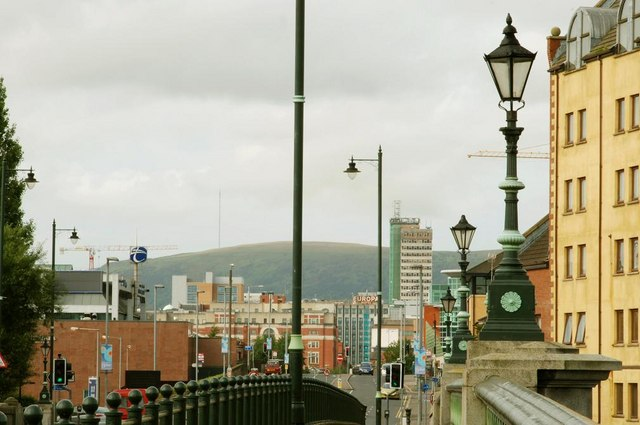
Handyside streetlamps in Belfast.

Andrew Handyside and Company was an iron founder in Derby, England, in the nineteenth century.

== Biography ==
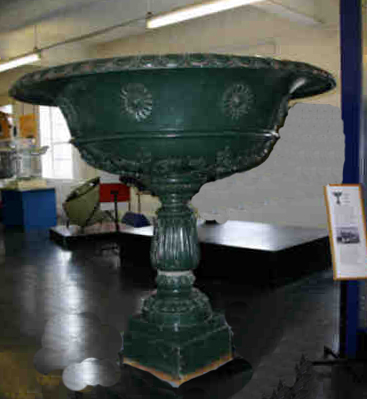
One of a pair of vases made by Handyside for Derby Arboretum c.1846. This one is on exhibition at the Derby Industrial Museum.

Born in Edinburgh, Scotland, in 1805, Handyside worked in his uncle Charles Baird's engineering business in St. Petersburg before taking over the Brittania Foundry in 1848. It had first been opened around 1820 by Weatherhead and Glover to cast ornamental ironwork, and had achieved a high reputation, partly from the skill of the workers, but also because of the quality of the local moulding sand. By the 1840s it was diversifying into railway components. Among the early customers was the Midland Railway's Derby Works for which it supplied cylinder blocks and other castings.

Although cast iron ornaments were going out of fashion, until the advent of steel there was an increasing demand for engineering and for iron framed construction. He concentrated in improving the strength of the material, which, when tested at Woolwich in 1854 proved to have a tensile strength of between 20 and 23 tons per square inch, against a norm of about seventeen. He also retained the artistry that had gone before and improved upon it.

His output ranged from garden ornaments to railway bridges. He produced lamp posts for the new gas street lighting (one of which still exists on Silk Mill Lane in Derby) and was one of the first to produce the new standard Post Office letterboxes. Nearly two thousand different window frames designs were produced. The company even supplied a dome to the steel maker Henry Bessemer for the roof of his conservatory.

When one considers the small area occupied by the works, on the bank of the River Derwent, hemmed in by the slope behind, its output seems remarkable. Between 1840 and 1846, for instance, it produced four hundred bridges for the London, Brighton and South Coast Railway.

In time, the works also produced rolling mills, hammers, forges and presses, at first for its own use, then for others, including the new steel mills.

It began manufacturing arched structures, such as the train sheds for railway stations, including, in 1854, Bradford Adolphus Street, Middlesbrough, and St. Enoch in Glasgow. In the 1870s the company's prefabricated market halls, built from standardised components were exported all over the world. In 1870 it built Wilford Toll Bridge, 1871 Trent Bridge, both at Nottingham and, in 1872, the Albert Suspension Bridge in London. Other bridges and structures were built in Russia, Japan, Africa, South America, Tasmania (Australia), Canada and India. Structural components, such as support columns, were also used by architects in many countries - an example being found in the main square of the city of Tampico, Mexico.

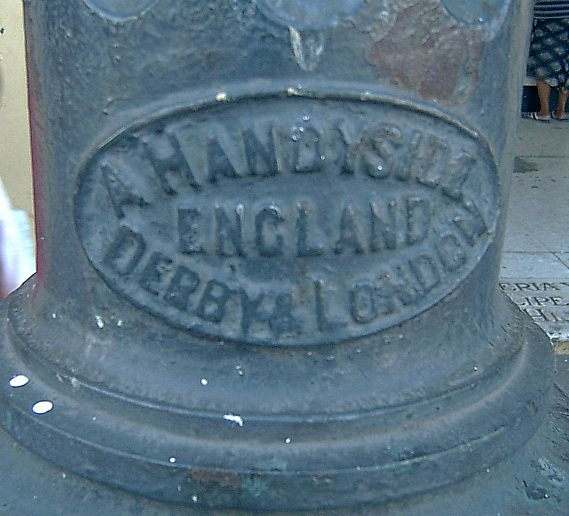
Foundry plate on a support column

In 1874, Andrew Handyside achieved another first, realising that the depreciation of buildings, plant and machinery should be set against their net profits. Unfortunately, their local inspector of taxes disagreed. The company won its initial appeal but then lost in the Court of Exchequer Chamber.

In 1877, the Great Northern Railway came to Derby, with a long viaduct from the east across the Derwent Valley, slicing through the northern part of the city, including Friar Gate – a very well-to-do area. To placate the residents, a graceful bridge was built across the road. This, though initially reviled, is now much prized by the citizens of the city, who have successfully resisted several attempts by the modernisers to replace it with a bypass. Handyside also provided a bridge across the River Derwent which was tested by running six locomotives across it.

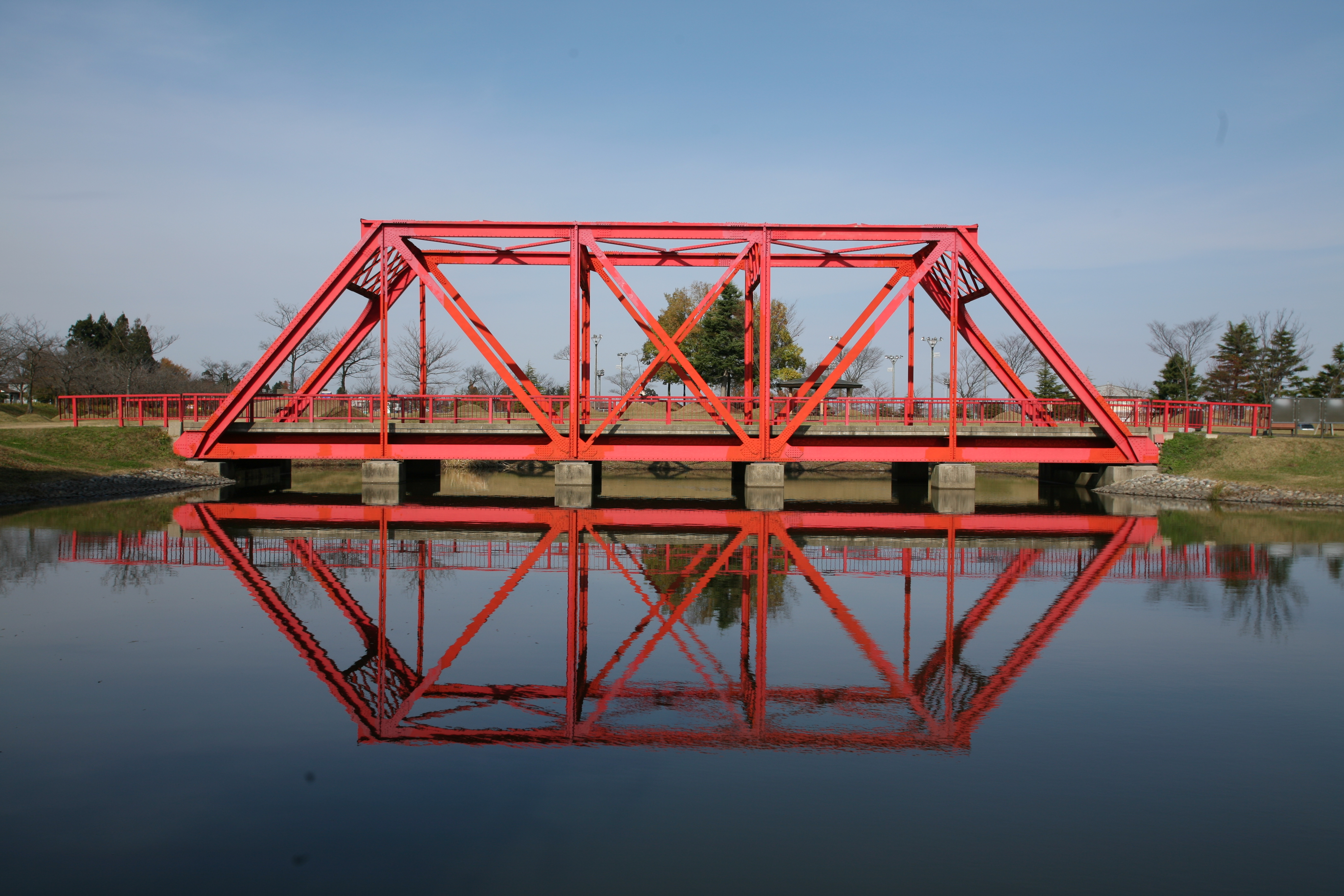
Koshiji Bridge in Japan. (partly preserved)

In 1877, the Cheshire Lines Committee opened its new line and Handysides provided the structures of the Manchester Central and of Liverpool Central stations. Another Handyside structure that still exists is the Outwood Viaduct on the Bury to Clifton Junction line, converted from a timber superstructure in 1881. Although the line closed in 1966 it has since been restored as part of a nature trail. One of his bridges, Koshiji Bridge, in Japan has been shortened and moved to a park so that it can be preserved.

The largest structure built by Handysides, said to be the largest hall in the kingdom covered by one span of iron and glass, was the 1886 National Agricultural Hall in London, now known as Olympia.

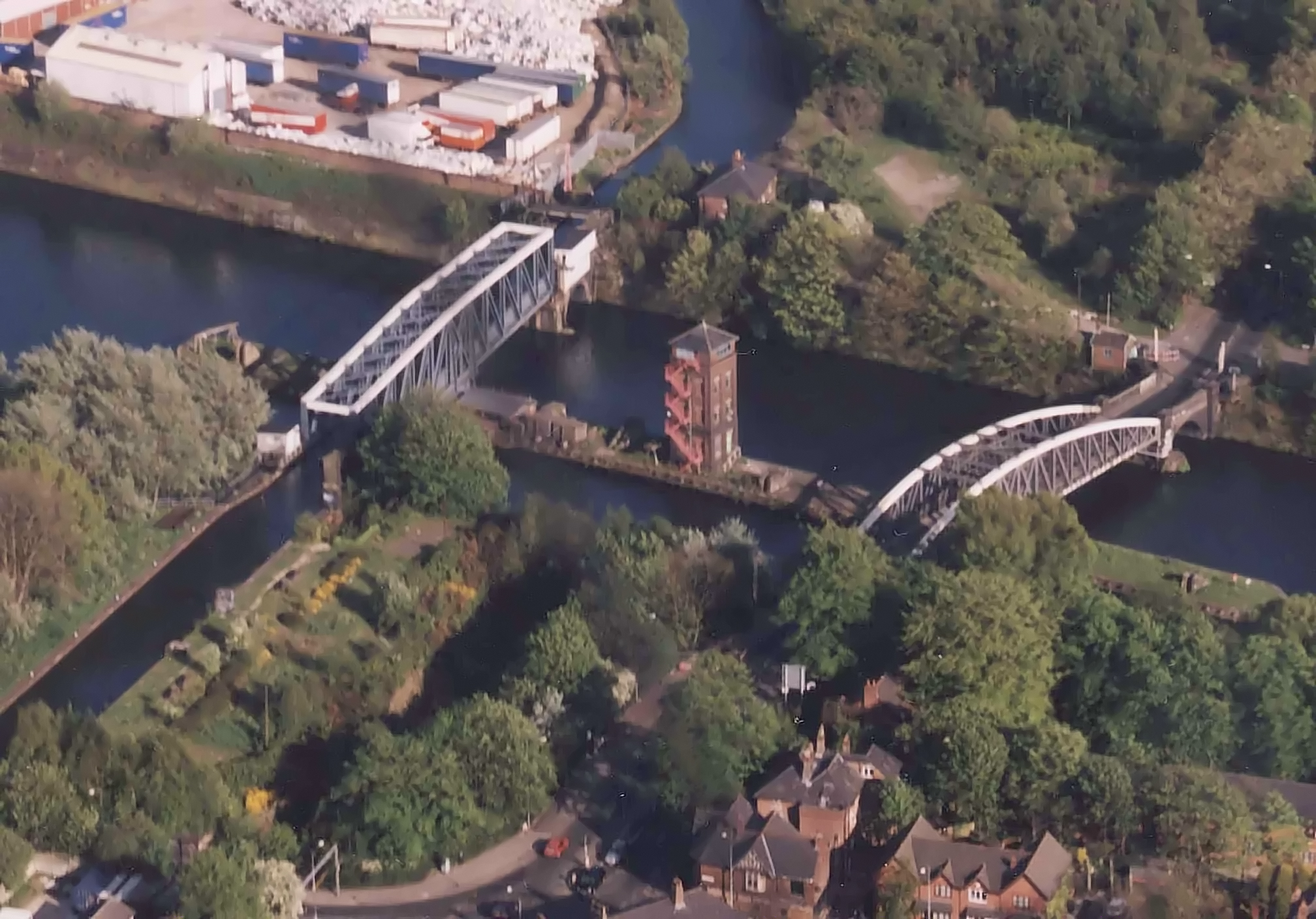
Barton Swing Aqueduct (left) and Barton Road Swing Bridge (right) over Manchester Ship Canal.

In 1893 Handysides provided the structures for the Manchester Ship Canal, including the Barton Swing Aqueduct and the Barton Road Swing Bridge. Such was his thoroughness, that he assembled and tested it in the yard before shipping it to site.

Handyside died in 1887 and the firm gradually declined until it closed early in the twentieth century. The foundry was demolished to be replaced by a housing estate, the only remaining traces being the Furnace public house and the name of a road: Handyside Street.

== Directors of the company ==
- Sir David Radcliffe, Mayor of Liverpool 1885, 1886

== See also ==
William Handyside - Engineer
