= Barton Aqueduct =

Former aqueduct over the River Irwell in England

Coordinates: 53.4747°N 2.3522°W

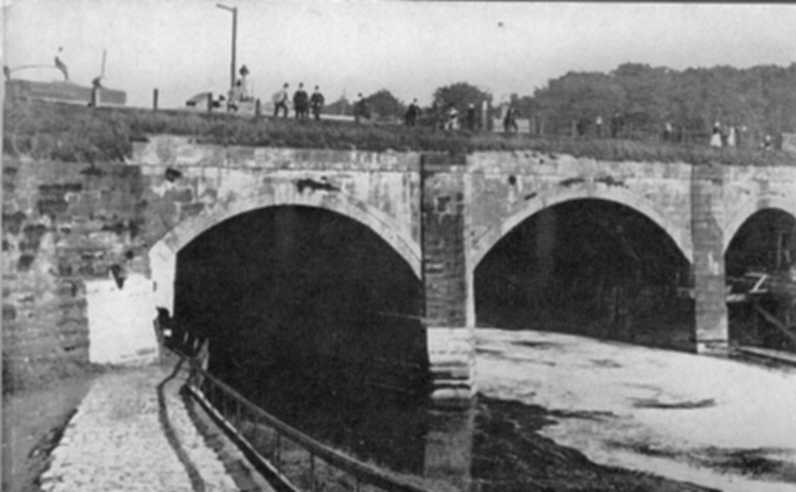
The Barton Aqueduct shortly before its demolition in 1893

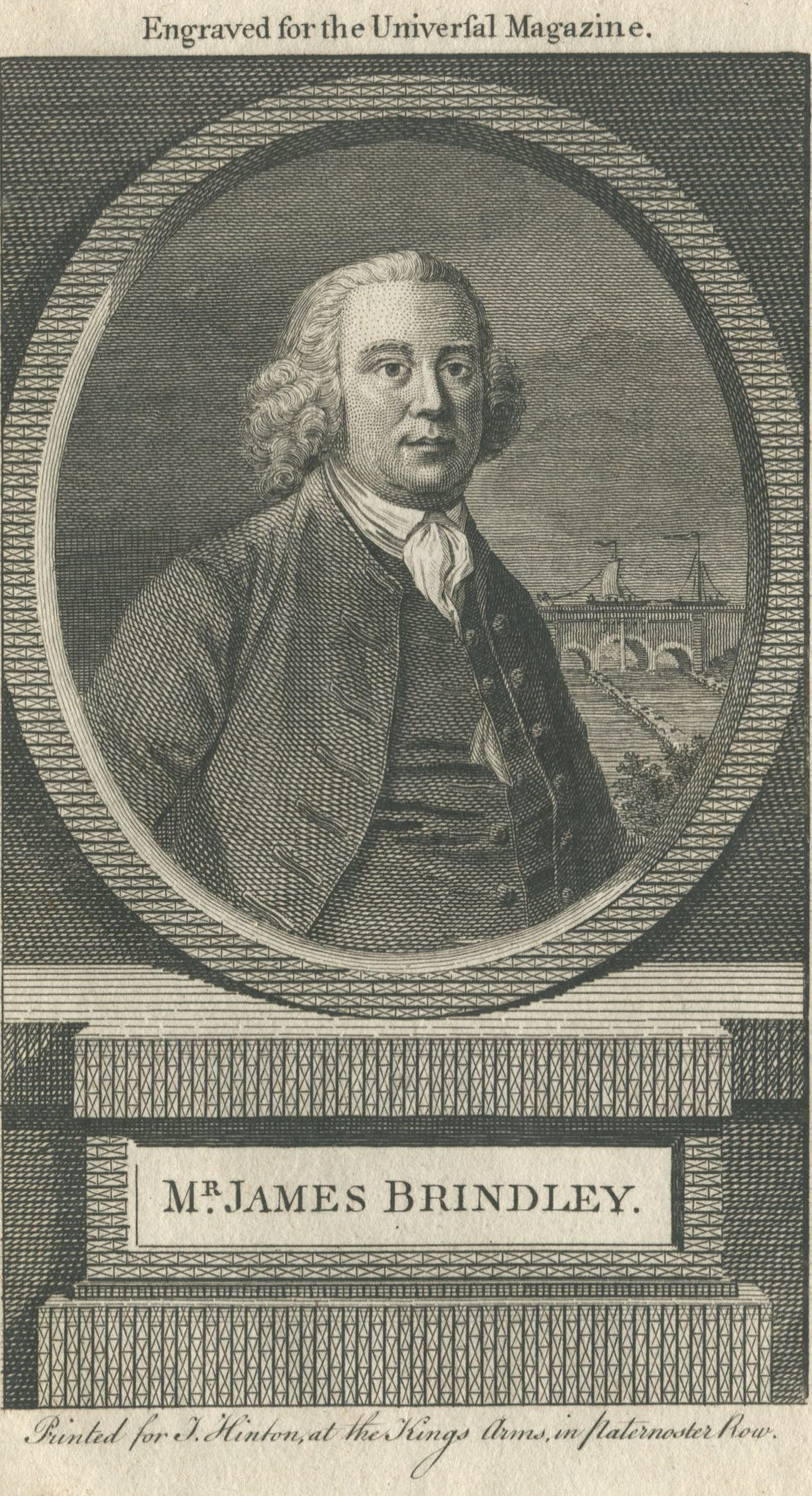

The Barton Aqueduct, opened on 17 July 1761, carried the Bridgewater Canal over the River Irwell at Barton-upon-Irwell, in the historic county of Lancashire, England. Designed largely by James Brindley under the direction of John Gilbert, it was the first navigable aqueduct to be built in England, "one of the seven wonders of the canal age" according to industrial archaeologist Mike Nevell.

Construction proceeded quickly, but disaster almost struck when the aqueduct was first filled with water and one of its three arches began to buckle under the weight. Remedial work took several months, but the aqueduct was still opened to traffic only 15 months after the enabling Act of Parliament had been passed, on 17 July 1761. It remained in use for more than 100 years, until the construction of the Manchester Ship Canal necessitated its demolition in 1893, replaced by the Barton Swing Aqueduct.

== Background ==
The original intention was for the Bridgewater Canal to reach Salford from the Duke of Bridgewater's coal mines in Worsley, by remaining on the north bank of the Irwell. Work began in 1759, but it was quickly decided to alter the route by building a masonry aqueduct to carry the waterway over the Irwell at Barton, and terminate instead in Manchester, to the south of the river. A Bill to authorise the new route was presented to parliament on 13 November 1759, and in January the following year Brindley travelled to London to give evidence before a parliamentary committee in support of the proposal.

Although a gifted engineer Brindley had no formal education and rarely, if ever, committed his designs to paper. When questioned by the parliamentary committee about the composition of the puddle he frequently referred to in his evidence, he had a mass of clay brought into the committee room. He then formed the clay into a trough and showed how it would only form a watertight seal if it had been worked with water to form puddle. "Thus it is" said Brindley "that I form a watertight-trunk to carry water over rivers and valleys wherever they cross the path of the canal." Later, when asked to produce a drawing of the bridge or aqueduct he proposed to build, he replied that he had no representation of it on paper but would demonstrate his intention by use of a model. He then went out and bought a large round of Cheshire cheese, which he divided into two equal halves saying "Here is my model". Then, to the amusement of the committee, he used the two halves of cheese to represent the semi-circular arches and laid a long, rectangular object over the top to demonstrate the position of the river flowing under the aqueduct and the canal flowing over it.

Although the duke had seen navigable aqueducts in use on canals when travelling abroad on his Grand Tour, the idea of such a structure carrying a canal over a river was new to England and was ridiculed by contemporary engineers. One brought in to review the plans, at Brindley's request, commented in a report to the Duke of Bridgewater that "I have often heard of castles in the air, but never before saw where one was to be erected." The necessary Act of Parliament was passed in March 1760, and was quite specific about the form the aqueduct had to take, to protect the viability of the Mersey & Irwell Navigation below. There was already a three-arch road bridge, Barton Bridge, passing over the Irwell, and the aqueduct was required not to restrict traffic on the river any more than the road bridge already did. It had to have the same number of arches, the foundations for which had to be fixed in the river bed, and the arches had to be at least as wide and high as those of the road bridge.

== Construction ==
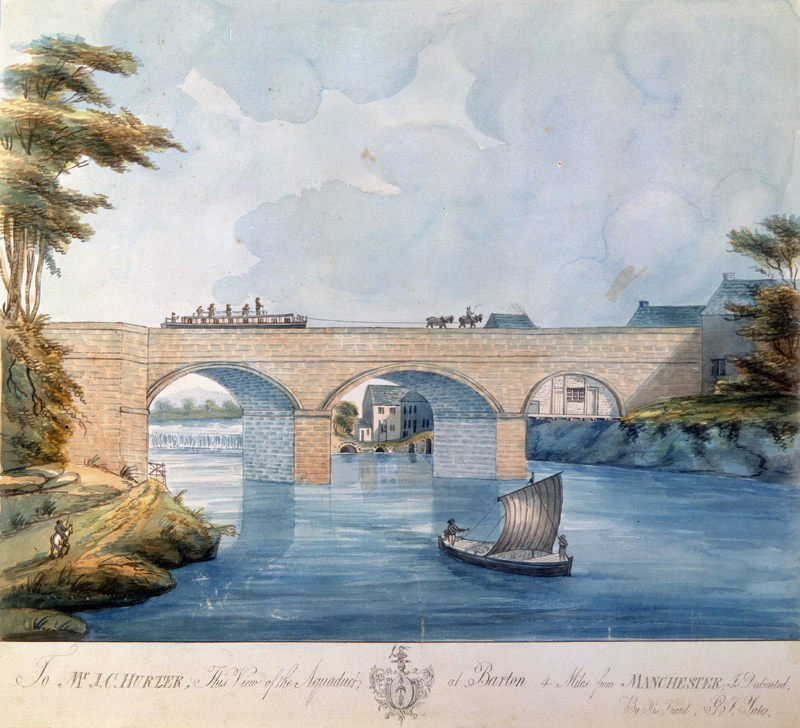
Watercolour, pen and ink drawing of Barton Aqueduct in 1793 by G. F. Yates

At about 200 yards (180 m) long, 12 yards (11 m) wide and 39 feet (12 m) above the river at its highest point, the aqueduct was, for its time, an enormous construction. Early illustrations show the aqueduct's piers to have been flat-faced, but an engraving of 1864 shows them to have pointed cutwaters extending beyond the spring of the arch; it is likely that the piers were refaced in the early 1820s. The arches were composed of several rings of brickwork, with masonry used for decorative keystones. All the masonry used in the structure was coursed ashlar.

On the day it was first tested the water was allowed to flow in, but one of the arches began to buckle under the weight. Brindley, overcome with anxiety, retired to his bed at the Bishop Blaize tavern in nearby Stretford. Gilbert, realising that Brindley had placed too much weight on the sides of the arch, removed the clay and laid layers of straw and freshly puddled clay; when the water was allowed to flow in again the masonry held firm. According to a statement by Francis Egerton, 8th Earl of Bridgewater printed in 1820, his uncle, the duke, had told him that there was a distortion of one of the arches, and that Gilbert had addressed the problem by placing more weight on the crown of the arch and less on the haunches. The arch was then covered with straw and allowed to stand until the following spring, when the mortar was set and the arch had become stable, but its curve remained irregular.

== Operation and legacy ==
The aqueduct was opened to traffic on 17 July 1761, only 15 months after the enabling Act had been passed, and it was soon being used by the duke's barges to carry coal to Manchester from his mines at Worsley. The construction of the aqueduct excited great admiration, and writers of the day often remarked on the strange and novel sight afforded by the canal where it crossed the Irwell. The structure became one of the wonders of the age and crowds came from all over the country to view it, along with the drilling of the sough for the duke's Worsley navigable levels. Those who saw it were often struck by the advantages of still-water navigation when they saw ten or twelve men slowly hauling a single barge against the flow of the Irwell, while 40 feet (12 m) above a horse, mule, or perhaps two men, could be seen hauling several linked barges across the still waters of the aqueduct.

Although the aqueduct was 12 yards (11 m) wide overall, the waterway it carried was only half that width. The Bridgewater Canal had been built to accommodate the Mersey flat boats then in common use, which had a beam of about 14 feet (4.3 m), making two-way traffic impossible. A signalling system was therefore installed to control access to the aqueduct. A pole 15 feet (4.6 m) high in the centre of the arch at the Stretford bank supported a semaphore system with two arms on each side, operated by levers at ground level.

Although Gilbert later had to resurface the aqueduct, the structure remained in use for more than 100 years. In the first volume of his Lives of the Engineers (1862) Scottish author Samuel Smiles said of the construction that "Humble though it now appears, it was parent of the magnificent aqueducts of Rennie and Telford, and the viaducts of Stephenson and Brunel".

== Replacement ==
Barton Aqueduct's fate was sealed with the passage of the Manchester Ship Canal Act 1885 (48 & 49 Vict. c. clxxxviii), which allowed for the construction of a navigable waterway large enough to accommodate ocean-going vessels from the estuary of the River Mersey the 36 miles (58 km) into Manchester, partly along the Irwell. As the arches of the aqueduct were too small to allow large ships to pass through it was demolished in 1893, and replaced by the Barton Swing Aqueduct still in use today. So solidly built was the old aqueduct that dynamite had to be used to expedite its demolition.

Some of the stonework of Brindley's aqueduct has been preserved in the nearby Barton Memorial Arch, a monument to his "castle in the air".
