= Edward Leader Williams =

English civil engineer (1828–1910)

Sir Edward Leader Williams
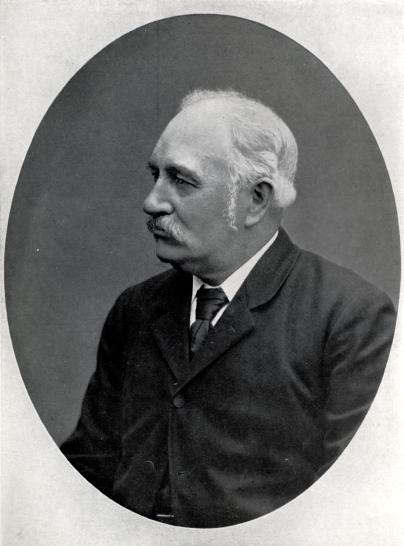
- Photograph taken in the 1880s, during construction of the Manchester Ship Canal
- Born: 28 April 1828; Worcester, England
- Died: 1 January 1910 (aged 81); Bowdon, Cheshire, England
- Occupation: Civil engineer
- Spouses: Ellen Maria Popplewell (m. 1852–1860) Catherine Louisa Clinch (m. 1862)
- Parent(s): Edward Leader Williams and Sarah Whiting

Sir Edward Leader Williams (28 April 1828 – 1 January 1910) was an English civil engineer, chiefly remembered as the designer of the Manchester Ship Canal, but also heavily involved in other canal projects in north Cheshire.

== Early life ==
Williams was born in Worcester on 28 April 1828, the son of a civil engineer also named Edward (responsible for works to make the River Severn navigable; also a keen amateur artist and friend of John Constable) and his Quaker wife Sarah Whiting. His brother Benjamin Williams Leader became a notable landscape artist. The family lived at Diglis House in Worcester (today the Diglis Hotel).

== Career ==
After attending the Royal Grammar School Worcester Williams became an apprentice to his father. In 1856 he was chosen out of 110 applicants to be chief engineer for the development of the navigable northern section of the River Weaver in Cheshire. He began to specialise in canal construction and in 1865 produced plans for enlarging the Weston Canal, a short stretch of canal linking the river near Frodsham to docks at Weston Point, Runcorn.

On 1 September 1872, he joined the Bridgewater Navigation Company and worked on the Bridgewater Canal.

=== Manchester Ship Canal ===
After submitting proposals in competition with another engineer (Hamilton Fulton), Williams was then appointed by Daniel Adamson in 1882 to design a new ship canal linking Manchester with the Irish Sea. Williams became chief designer and chief engineer, helping the Manchester Ship Canal Company formulate its proposals for the necessary Act of Parliament. From its initial reading in 1883, it took two years for the Bill to receive Royal Assent, and a further two years before the first construction work started, in November 1887. During the construction he was elected to membership of the Manchester Literary and Philosophical Society on 17 April 1888

The canal opened in 1894, and has been described as "a feat without precedent in modern history". As well as the canal itself, major engineering landmarks of the scheme included the Barton Swing Aqueduct (carrying the Bridgewater Canal over the Ship Canal) and a neighbouring swing bridge for road traffic at Barton.

After the official opening of the Manchester Ship Canal on 21 May 1894, Edward Leader Williams of the Oaks, in the Parish of Dunham Massey, in the County Palatine of Chester was knighted by Queen Victoria on 2 July by Letters Patent.

Williams' other works include the Anderton Boat Lift (1875) near Northwich in Cheshire, which links the navigable stretch of the River Weaver with the Trent and Mersey Canal.

== See also ==
- Delamere Dock
