= Dunham railway station (Greater Manchester) =

Former railway station in England

Coordinates: 53.3945°N 2.3943°W

Dunham W&SR railway station

General information
- Location: off School Lane, Dunham Town; England
- Lines: Warrington and Altrincham Junction Railway

Other information
- Status: Closed

History
- Opened: June 1854
- Closed: May 1855
- Previous names: Warrington and Altrincham Junction Railway
Location

Dunham W&SR railway station served Dunham Town between 1854 and closure in 1855.

== Construction and opening ==
The Warrington and Altrincham Junction Railway (W&AJR) built its railway line from Warrington Arpley via Latchford, Cheshire and Lymm to Skelton Junction near Altrincham during 1852–53 and passenger train services commenced on 1 November 1853. The station served Dunham Massey in Cheshire, now Greater Manchester which was opened in June 1854. The station was located off School Lane, Dunham Town. The station only operated briefly due to its proximity, westwards, to Dunham Massey railway station and closed in May 1855.
