= Heatley & Warburton railway station =

Former railway station in England

Coordinates: 53.39025°N 2.44750°W

Heatley & Warburton
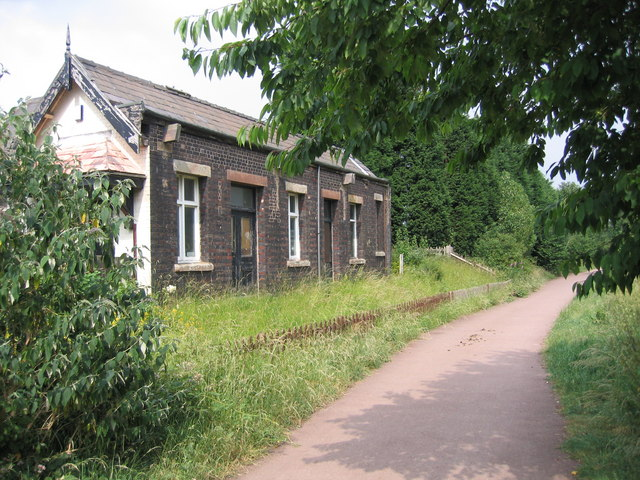

General information
- Location: near Lymm, Warrington; England
- Grid reference: SJ704882
- Platforms: 2

Other information
- Status: Disused

History
- Original company: Warrington and Stockport Railway
- Pre-grouping: London and North Western Railway
- Post-grouping: London Midland and Scottish Railway; London Midland Region of British Railways

Key dates
- 1 November 1853: Opened as Heatley
- 1857: Renamed Heatley & Warburton
- 10 September 1962: Closed to passengers
- 9 August 1965: Goods facilities withdrawn
Location

Heatley & Warburton railway station was located in Heatley near Warburton, Greater Manchester. It opened in 1853 and closed in 1962.

== Construction and opening ==
The Warrington and Altrincham Junction Railway (W&AJR) built its railway line from Warrington Arpley via Latchford, Cheshire and Lymm to Skelton Junction near Altrincham during 1852–53 and passenger train services commenced on 1 November 1853. There were six intermediate stations provided along the line's length including that at Heatley, in Cheshire, which was opened on 1 November 1853. The station was located on Mill Lane in Heatley.

== Names used by the railway station ==
The station was named Heatley from its opening until 1857 when it became Heatley & Warburton which name was retained until closure.

== Train services ==
The W&AJR changed its name to the Warrington and Stockport Railway on 4 August 1853, before the line was completed and that company was absorbed into the London and North Western Railway (LNWR) on 15 July 1867. The main LNWR train service through Dunham Massey railway station was from Liverpool Lime Street via Warrington Arpley to Broadheath, where trains joined the Manchester South Junction and Altrincham Railway and continued via Sale to Manchester London Road. In July 1922 the LNWR operated fifteen passenger trains in each direction on weekdays, eleven serving the full length of the line from Liverpool to Manchester and return.

== Amalgamation, nationalisation and closure ==
The LNWR was amalgamated into the London Midland and Scottish Railway (LMSR) on 1 January 1923. The LMSR continued to operate the passenger train service through Dunham Massey, but by July 1946 only eight trains per day in each direction stopped at the station. The LMSR was nationalised on 1 January 1948 and operations on the line were vested in British Railways London Midland Region (LMR).

Passenger services along the line were withdrawn and the station was closed by British Railways on 10 September 1962. Goods trains continued to use the line until 7 July 1985, when the need for extensive repairs to the Latchford Viaduct caused the line to be closed. The station building survives in use as a domestic dwelling.

| Preceding station | Disused railways | Following station |
|---|---|---|
| Lymm | LNWR; Warrington & Stockport Railway | Dunham Massey |
