= Listed buildings in Lymm =

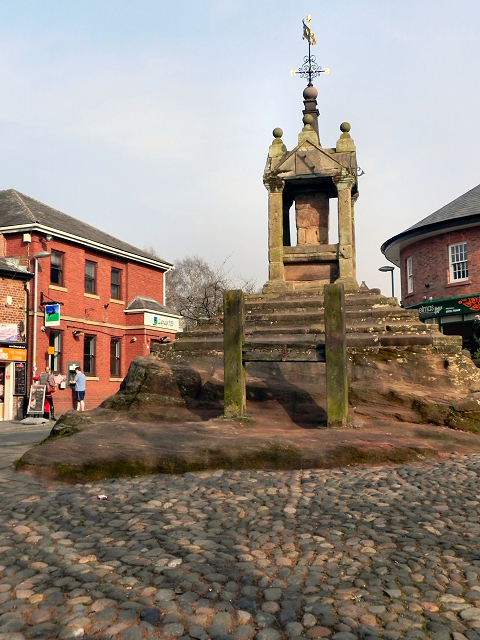
Lymm Cross, with stocks in foreground

In the English civil parish of Lymm, there are 55 buildings that are recorded in the National Heritage List for England as designated listed buildings. Of these, one is classified as Grade I and one as Grade II*; the remainder are at Grade II. Lymm is in the borough of Warrington and the ceremonial county of Cheshire. In the early 16th century, the civil parish was a prosperous agricultural area, divided into two manors, Lymm and Oughtrington. The Grade-II*-listed Lymm Hall, the oldest listed building in the civil parish, dates from the late 16th century and occupies the site of a medieval building which was the manorial seat. The largest settlement in the civil parish is Lymm, which has expanded into a small town whilst retaining its village centre. Several other small settlements within the parish remain separate, including Oughtrington; Oughtrington Hall dates from around 1810.

From the 16th century, industries developed in the parish, including quarrying, tanning, iron working, powder making and fustian cutting. Workers' cottages from the fustian-cutting industry have survived. The extension of the Bridgewater Canal, completed in 1776, facilitated industrial development. The canal runs through the northern part of the town of Lymm's centre, and many of the listed structures are associated with it, including three aqueducts, two bridges and a dock. Rapid industrial expansion occurred in the early 19th century, generating a need for an increased water supply. The damming of Bradley Brook in 1821–24 created a lake to the south of the town. Two bridges associated with Lymm Dam are listed. One carries the former toll road from Warrington to Stockport, now the A56. The other was constructed for William Lever (later Viscount Leverhulme) in 1918–19 to serve housing for his workers, which was never built. The arrival of the railway in 1853 further accelerated growth in Lymm, with substantial mid-Victorian houses being built for business owners on the edges of the town in Gothic and Italianate styles.

Many of the listed buildings lie within the three conservation areas of the town of Lymm, which encompass the old village centre, the dam and the lake, as well as the Victorian suburbs to the north and west of the centre. Lymm stands on the Mid Cheshire Ridge, with sandstone bedrock, and many of the listed buildings are constructed from this material. Crags and outcrops are present on the surface, for example, under Lymm Cross, which is listed at Grade I. There are also a few listed timber-framed buildings, which are relatively rare in the borough of Warrington. Unusual listed structures include an octagonal water tower with battlements, icehouse, pigeon house, mounting block, milepost, stone-lined well, war memorial, water-point case and the village stocks.

== Key ==
Grade	Criteria
Grade I	Buildings of exceptional interest, sometimes considered to be internationally important.
Grade II*	Particularly important buildings of more than special interest.
Grade II	Buildings of national importance and special interest.

Name and location	Photograph	Date	Notes	Grade
Lymm Hall; 53.3792°N 2.4759°W	—	Late 16th century	Constructed in sandstone and brick, it was originally an E-shaped Elizabethan moated house. Since then, the hall has been altered and restored, particularly in the 19th century.	II*
Moat House, Lymm Hall; 53.3796°N 2.4760°W	—	Early 17th century (probable)	Originally part of the stables of Lymm Hall, this is a two-storey house constructed in sandstone with slate roofs in a rectangular plan.	II
Lymm Cross; 53.3811°N 2.4776°W	Lymm Cross on sandstone outcrop	Early to mid-17th century	This is a sandstone structure standing on an artificially stepped sandstone outcrop. The shaft of the cross is contained in a square pavilion with square corner pillars, which has a roof with pedimented gables and a ball finial.	I
Rivington Cottage; 53.3774°N 2.4770°W		17th century	A cottage with a central section and two wings, in brick and stone; much altered since its original build.	II
Stocks; 53.38109°N 2.47753°W	Stocks, with Lymm Cross in background	17th century (probable)	These are located to the west of Lymm Cross. They were restored in 1897 and consist of oak stocks in square sandstone supports.	II
90 Warrington Road; 53.3828°N 2.5100°W		Mid-17th century	A timber-framed cottage with some wattle and daub, but mainly brick, infilling. Part of the front has been rebuilt in brick and is painted black-and-white. It is a single-storey building with a thatched roof.	II
Tanyard Farmhouse; 53.3875°N 2.4628°W	—	Mid-17th century	A sandstone farmhouse with brick extensions added in about 1800. It is in two storeys and has grey slate roofs.	II
Bridge over moat, Lymm Hall; 53.37946°N 2.47613°W	—	Mid-17th century (probable)	A stone bridge over what is now a dry moat.	II
Wildersmoor Hall Farm; 53.3709°N 2.4595°W	—	Mid-17th century (probable)	Originally this was a timber-framed building, but this has been largely replaced with brickwork and some sandstone. It has a single storey with three rooms on the attic.	II
8 Booth's Lane; 53.3749°N 2.4912°W	—	1677	A rectangular two-storey house in sandstone, now painted, with a grey-green slate roof. At the front facing the road is a gable with a datestone, under which is a five-light in each storey. On the right side are two three-light windows in each storey. The house was extended in the 20th century.	II
Well, Wildersmoor House; 53.37236°N 2.45648°W	—	Before 1700 (probable)	A stone-lined circular well with a stone parapet around a smaller circular opening. Most wells in the area are brick-lined.	II
1A and 3 Lymm Bridge; 53.3820°N 2.4776°W		1733	Now two houses, this was originally a single house. It is in brick with stone dressings, and has a slate roof.	II
Barsbank Lane Aqueduct; 53.3816°N 2.4928°W	Barsbank Lane Aqueduct	c. 1770	An aqueduct designed by James Brindley to carry the Bridgewater Canal and its towpath over Barsbank Lane. It is constructed in brick and sandstone.	II
Bridgewater Street Aqueduct; 53.3816°N 2.4793°W	—	c. 1770	An aqueduct designed by James Brindley to carry the Bridgewater Canal and its towpath over the link between Bridgewater Street and Whitbarrow Road; it is constructed in brick and sandstone.	II
Burford Lane Aqueduct; 53.3821°N 2.4466°W	Burford Lane Aqueduct	c. 1770	An aqueduct designed by James Brindley to carry the Bridgewater Canal and its towpath over Burford Lane. It is constructed in brick and sandstone.	II
Covered canal dock 53.3815°N 2.4801°W	—	c. 1770	A dock designed by James Brindley with a barrel vaulted roof leading from the Bridgewater Canal that is entered by a brick arch.	II
Grantham's Bridge; 53.3828°N 2.4499°W	Grantham's Bridge	c. 1770	A brick accommodation bridge designed by James Brindley.	II
Lloyd Bridge; 53.3829°N 2.4572°W	Lloyd Bridge	c. 1770	A brick bridge designed by James Brindley to carry Oughtrington Lane over the Bridgewater Canal. It is named after a family who served the canal company for more than 200 years.	II
Dane Bank House; 53.3825°N 2.4787°W	—	Late 18th century	Formerly a house in red brick on a sandstone plinth with slate roofs, and a Doric portico. It has a T-shaped plan, and is in two storeys. The house has since been converted into flats.	II
Wall and archway, Dane Bank House; 53.3822°N 2.4776°W	—	Late 18th century	A red brick wall, and an archway of sandstone voissoirs with a projecting keystone carried on brick piers.	II
Pigeon house, Dane Bank House; 53.3825°N 2.4793°W	—	Late 18th century (probable)	A rectangular brick structure with slate roofs. The walls contain circular flight-holes.	II
1 Lymm Bridge; 53.3819°N 2.4777°W	1 Lymm Bridge, Lymm	Late 18th century (probable)	A two-storey house in painted brick with stone dressings facing the Bridgewater Canal. Its screen wall, steps and railings are included in the listing.	II
Barn, Wildersmoor Hall Farm; 53.3707°N 2.4597°W	—	1788	Originally built as a threshing barn, it has been converted into loose boxes. It is in brown brick with slate roofs, and contains earlier fabric.	II
The Nook; 53.3833°N 2.4529°W	—	Late 18th or early 19th century	A two-storey house in brown brick with stone dressings and a slate roof. In the grounds are a cast iron pump and a sandstone trough that are included in the listing.	II
Trenace House; 53.3810°N 2.4805°W	—	1800 or earlier	A symmetrical house in three storeys with a Doric pedimented doorcase, a bay window and sash windows.	II
Statham Lodge; 53.3845°N 2.5000°W	Statham Lodge, Lymm	c. 1800	A pebbledashed country house with a slate roof in two storeys. Later converted into a hotel.	II
Oughtrington Hall; 53.3787°N 2.4595°W	—	c. 1810	The hall was remodelled for Trafford Trafford possibly by Thomas Harrison. It is constructed in rendered brick with stone dressings and a slate roof in Neoclassical style. The hall is now part of Lymm High School.	II
Milepost, Booth's Hill Road; 53.37964°N 2.49479°W	—	c. 1821	A cast iron milepost on the former turnpike from Warrington to Altrincham.	II
1, 3, 5 and 7 Arley Grove; 53.3758°N 2.4662°W	—	Early 19th century	A terrace of four three-storey cottages built for fustian cutters. They are in brick, the brickwork of No 1 is rendered, the rest are painted; all have slate roofs and sash windows.	II
11, 13, 15, 17, and 19 Church Road; 53.3795°N 2.4854°W		Early 19th century	A terrace of three-storey cottages built for fustian cutters. They are in brick with slate roofs, and have sash windows.	II
127 Higher Lane; 53.3746°N 2.4643°W	—	Early 19th century	A symmetrical two-storey brick house with grey slate roofs, containing 12-pane recessed sash windows.	II
12 Millbank; 53.3829°N 2.4791°W	—	Early 19th century	Originally the coach house and coachman's house to Danebank House. A two-storey house in red brick with a grey slate roof.	II
1 New Road; 53.3823°N 2.4772°W	—	Early 19th century	The end house of a terrace in pebbledashed brick with a slate roof. It has an L-shaped plan, and was Gothicised in about 1830, the rest of the terrace retaining its Georgian style.	II
3, 5, 7, and 9 New Road; 53.3824°N 2.4771°W	—	Early 19th century	A terrace of five two-storey brick cottages, each with a single sash window.	II
5, 7, 9, 11 and 13 The Grove; 53.3803°N 2.4785°W	5-13 The Grove, Lymm	Early 19th century	A terrace of five cottages in brick painted white with slate roofs.	II
Burford Lane Warehouse; 53.3816°N 2.4450°W		Early 19th century	Built as a warehouse and attached agent's house in brown brick with slate roofs on the south side of the Bridgewater Canal. The warehouse is in three storeys, the house in two.	II
Manor House; 53.3921°N 2.4488°W	—	Early 19th century	A symmetrical two-storey house in pebbledashed brick with slate roofs. The entrance doorcase is in Tuscan style with a pediment.	II
Coach House, The Nook; 53.3835°N 2.4528°W	—	Early 19th century	Built as a coach house, this is a two-storey brown brick structure with a slate roof.	II
Icehouse, Wildersmoor House; 53.37258°N 2.45655°W	—	Early 19th century	An icehouse in brick in the grounds of Wildersmoor House.	II
16 Bridgewater Street; 53.3812°N 2.4789°W	16 Bridgewater Street, Lymm	c. 1830	A rendered shop and accommodation with a sandstone portion to the rear. In two storeys with a basement, it is in Jacobean style.	II
Lodge, Oughtrington Hall; 53.3766°N 2.4603°W		Mid-19th century	A stone building with a grey slate roof, it has a Tuscan portico carried on four columns. The windows are 6-pane sashes.	II
Lymm Water Tower; 53.3757°N 2.4715°W	Lymm Water Tower	Mid-19th century	An octagonal building in sandstone with an octagonal battlemented three-stage tower.	II
St Mary's Church; 53.3771°N 2.4784°W	St Mary's Church, Lymm	1850–52	The church was designed by John Dobson. Alterations and additions were made in 1870–72 by John Douglas, and the tower was replaced in 1888–90 by J. S. Crowther. It is constructed in sandstone, and has a clerestory, transepts, and a west tower	II
Brookfield and Fourways; 53.3800°N 2.4832°W	—	1864	A pair of houses in cream brick with yellow sandstone bands and slate roofs.	II
Brookfield House; 53.3795°N 2.4842°W	—	c. 1865	A brick house with stone dressings in two storeys plus attics. It has a three-storey tower porch surmounted by a truncated spire containing hipped dormers, and has a cast iron crest.	II
Burford Lane Farmhouse; 53.3767°N 2.4453°W	—	1866	The farmhouse was built for George C. Dewhurst and designed by John Douglas. The lower two storeys are in brick and the attics are timber-framed.	II
Stable and cartshed, Burford Lane Farmhouse; 53.3764°N 2.4451°W	—	1866	Designed by John Douglas, it is in brick with a timber-framed gable.	II
Barn, granary and shippon, Burford Lane Farmhouse; 53.3766°N 2.4450°W	—	1866	Designed by John Douglas, it is a symmetrical brick building with a timber-framed gable, surmounted by a dovecote and weathervane.	II
Mounting block, Higher Lane; 53.37684°N 2.47257°W	—	Mid-Victorian	A mounting block in monolithic sandstone, it has two steps at each end.	II
Case to water point, Agden Bridge; 53.37620°N 2.42858°W	—	Mid-Victorian (probable)	A square cast iron case with two doors and a pyramidal cap and battlemented edges, decorated with traditional canal rose motifs.	II
St Peter's Church, Oughtrington; 53.3803°N 2.4609°W	St Peter's Church, Oughtrington	1871–72	Designed by Slater and Carpenter, the church is in sandstone with grey slate roofs, and has a clerestory, an apsidal chancel, and a northeast steeple.	II
Bridge at outflow of Lymm Dam; 53.3785°N 2.4801°W		Late 19th century	A bridge carrying the A56 road over the outfall and spillway from the dam. It is constructed in sandstone, and was widened in the 20th century on the south side in concrete.	II
Bridge over head of Lymm Dam; 53.3720°N 2.4853°W	Crossfield Bridge over head of Lymm Dam	1918–19	A reinforced concrete bridge built by Fairclough Brothers for W. H. Lever and C. G. Dewhurst leading to an unexecuted development scheme.	II
War Memorial; 53.37748°N 2.47916°W	War memorial	1921	The war memorial is in the grounds of St Mary's Church, it is in Woolton sandstone, and its design is based on the Cross of Sacrifice. The memorial consists of a Latin cross with the sword of sacrifice carved in relief on the front and the back. The cross is octagonal and tapers to the top, and stands on an octagonal plinth on three octagonal steps. On the plinth are inscriptions relating to both World Wars.	II
The Polygons; 53.3840°N 2.4800°W	—	1978–79	A detached house designed by Granville Gough for his own use. It is constructed in brick with timber cladding on a concrete raft. The house is in a single storey, its plan consisting of a series of interlinked polygons, with a central top-lit octagonal lounge, a service wing to the south and a bedroom wing to the north. Included in the listing are a York stone path and terraces around the house, a reflecting pool, and the eastern boundary wall.	II

== See also ==
- Listed buildings in Appleton
- Listed buildings in Dunham Massey
- Listed buildings in Grappenhall and Thelwall
- Listed buildings in High Legh
- Listed buildings in Warburton
- Listed buildings in Woolston
