= Warrington railway station =

Warrington railway station may refer to one of the open stations in Warrington, Cheshire, England:

- Warrington Bank Quay railway station, on the West Coast Main Line
- Warrington Central railway station, on the Liverpool to Manchester line
- Warrington West railway station, also on the Liverpool to Manchester line

Closed stations in Warrington two closed stations in Warrington, Cheshire, England:

- Dallam Lane railway station, the original terminus of the Warrington and Newton Railway closed in 1965
- Warrington Arpley railway station, closed in 1965
- Warrington Wilderspool railway station, closed in 1871
