= St Mary's Church, Lymm =

Coordinates: 53.3771°N 2.4784°W

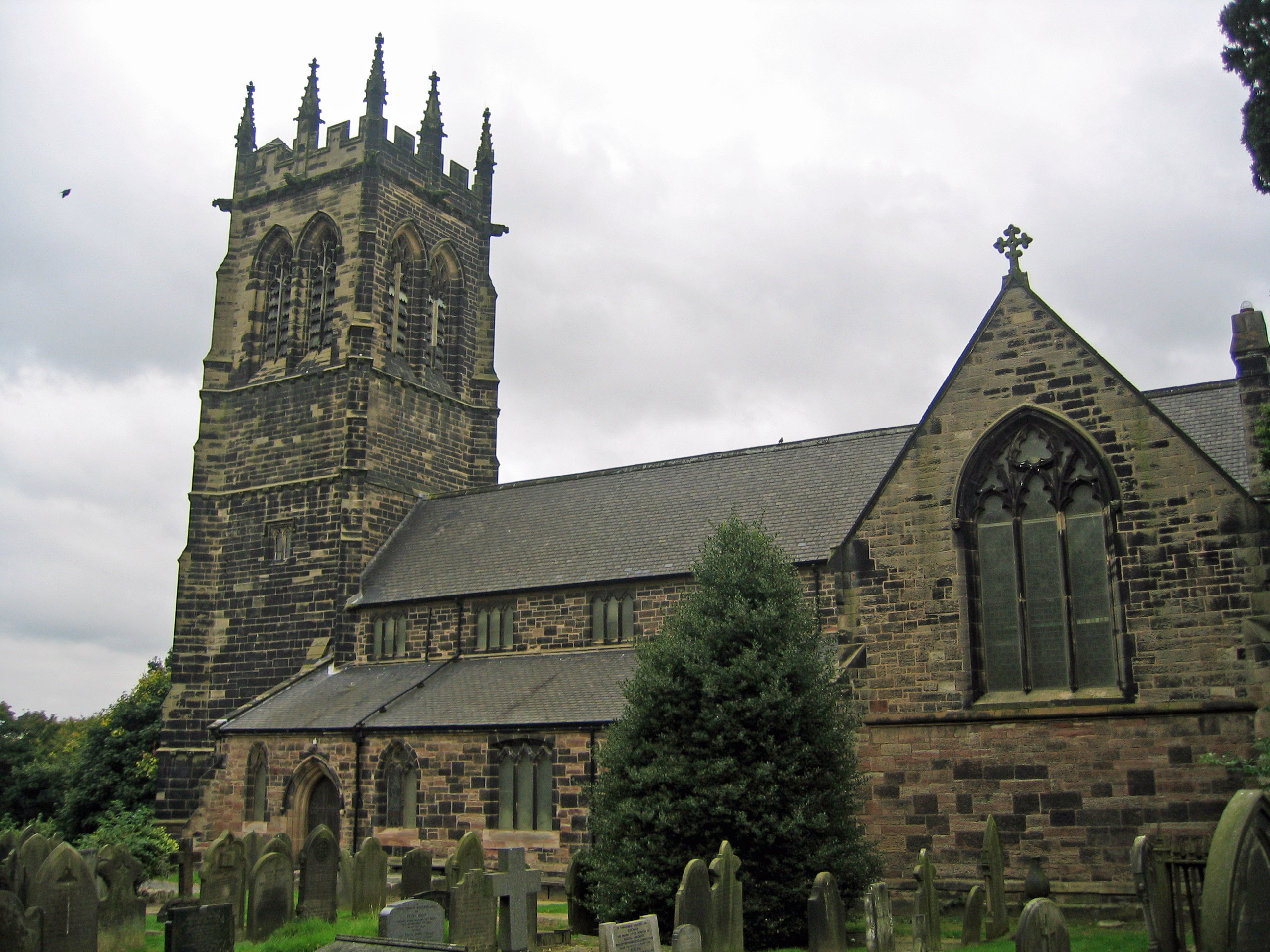
- St Mary's Church, Lymm, from the south

- Location in Cheshire
- OS grid reference: SJ 683 868
- Location: Lymm, Borough of Warrington, Cheshire
- Country: England
- Denomination: Anglican
- Website: St Mary's Lymm

History
- Status: Parish church

Architecture
- Functional status: Active
- Heritage designation: Grade II
- Designated: 24 January 1950
- Architect(s): John Dobson, John Douglas; J. S. Crowther
- Architectural type: Church
- Style: Gothic Revival
- Completed: 1890

Specifications
- Materials: Buff sandstone

Administration
- Province: York
- Diocese: Chester
- Archdeaconry: Chester
- Deanery: Great Budworth
- Parish: Lymm

Clergy
- Rector: Rev Beverley Jameson

St Mary's Church is the Anglican parish church of Lymm, Warrington, Cheshire, England, standing on a bank overlooking Lymm Dam. It is a grade II listed building. It is an active church in the diocese of Chester, the archdeaconry of Chester and the deanery of Great Budworth.

== History ==
The Domesday Book shows that a church was on the site in the 11th century. Since then it has been rebuilt a number of times. The present church was built in 1850–52 to a design by John Dobson of Newcastle. The nave and aisles from an older church dating from the 15th century were blown up with gunpowder prior to the rebuilding. Alterations and additions were made to the church in 1870–72 by the Chester architect John Douglas, including an organ chamber and the reredos. The tower was replaced in 1888–90 by J. S. Crowther.

== Architecture ==
=== Exterior ===
The church is built in buff sandstone. Its plan consists of a west tower, a five-bay nave with a clerestory, north and south aisles, a north porch, transepts, a chancel, and a vestry. The tower is in three stages with diagonal buttresses and an embattled top. Its west window is in Perpendicular style, and the bell-openings are paired with panel tracery.

=== Interior ===
The chancel has a panelled ceiling, and the transepts contain galleries. The plain pulpit is dated 1623. The stone sedilia and piscina are in Decorated style, date from 1871 to 1872, and were designed by John Douglas. The font is octagonal and dates probably from the 1660s. The church contains an ogee-headed tomb recess dating from about 1322 that has been moved from the older church. It contains a "supposed" Roman altar. On the walls are two sgraffiti, one in the south aisle dated 1883, and the other in the north aisle, dated 1906. The stained glass in the west window is dated 1853, and is possibly by David Evans; the glass in the east window is from 1865. Three windows in the south aisle, dated 1851, are by Wailes. One window in the north aisle, dating from 1897 is by Kempe, and another, dating from about 1899, is probably by Shrigley and Hunt.

Memorials in the church include one to John Leigh, of Oughtrington Hall, who died in 1806, and his wife who died in 1819, and two tablets by E. H. Baily in the south transept to members of the Fox family who died between 1830 and 1845. There is also a wooden memorial to William Domvylle (of Lymm Hall) who died in 1686. Lymm's parish registers, now housed at Cheshire Record Office, provide records of the inhabitants of Lymm since the Reformation, including notable local families such as the Booths. Also in the church are 18th-century hatchments, and two churchwardens' staves dating from the early 19th century. The previous pipe organ was built in 1858 by Forster and Andrews, and rebuilt in 1944 by Jardine. The present electronic organ, built by the local organ-builder Hugh Banton, was installed in 2005. There is a ring of eight bells which were cast in 1891 by John Taylor and Company.

== External features ==
The churchyard contains the war graves of twelve service personnel, nine of World War I and three of World War II.

== See also ==
- Listed buildings in Lymm
- List of works by J. S. Crowther
- List of church restorations, amendments and furniture by John Douglas
