= Lymm Baptist Church =

Church in Cheshire, England

- The church from the northwest in 2023

- Location in Cheshire
- 53°22′35″N 2°28′21″W
- OS grid reference: SJ 68663 86729
- Location: Higher Lane, Lymm, Cheshire WA13 0AZ
- Country: England
- Denomination: Baptist
- Website: lymmbaptistchurch.com

History
- Status: Church
- Founded: 1850

Architecture
- Functional status: Active
- Architect: Mr Walton of Manchester
- Style: Decorated Gothic Revival
- Completed: 22 September 1850

Lymm Baptist Church is a Baptist church situated in the village of Lymm near Warrington, Cheshire, England. It stands on the A56 road (Higher Lane). Opened in 1850, it superseded a chapel of 1759 in the nearby village of Millington, which was one of Cheshire's earliest Baptist causes and one of the few founded by the heterodox minister John Johnson, leader of the Johnsonian Baptist group which was active locally. The building was substantially extended and modernised in the 1990s and remains in active use as a place of worship.

== History ==
John Johnson, an 18th-century Baptist minister of unconventional views, led a sect known as Johnsonian Baptists from around 1750. It was active mostly in the Cheshire and Liverpool areas. In 1759 a group of his followers bought land at Millington, between Warrington and Altrincham, and built a brick meeting-house there. It was registered for worship in October of that year. It was one of the earliest Baptist foundations in Cheshire, and rare because of its Johnsonian origins: most Cheshire chapels were associated with the General Baptists. There was earlier Baptist activity in the Millington area though: a meeting between John Wesley and an itinerant Baptist preacher John Pickup was recorded in 1747.

A family called Ridgway were important members of the chapel throughout its existence, and after Thomas Ridgway bought land in Lymm in 1848 it was decided that the church should move there. The population of Lymm was about 4,000 by this time, whereas Millington had remained a small village. Ridgway also provided the materials for the new chapel to be built, along with some of the money; the remaining funds were raised by the congregation. The architect (a Mr Walton) and builder (a Mr Bramhall) were both Manchester-based. Construction took place during 1850 following the laying of the foundation stone that spring, and the first service at Lymm was held on 22 September 1850. The preacher at this service was from Upper Hill Street Baptist Church at Wisbech, Cambridgeshire, another Johnsonian Baptist stronghold. A Sunday school, attached to the chapel, was built in 1851 and extended in 1852.

By the 1980s the chapel was too small and its layout was inflexible. In 1987 a feasibility study was undertaken into making improvements. The architectural firm of Joseph Finney and Sons of nearby Winsford undertook the project, initially valued at around £400,000. Work was completed in December 1992. A larger worship hall, the Millington Hall, was built, and the original (1850) chapel was reconfigured and renamed the Ridgway Hall.

By the 19th century, Lymm Baptist Church's original mother church at Millington had been relegated to the status of a preaching-station served from Lymm. It closed in about 1924 and, after being used as a workshop, became a house in the 1980s. During the time it was a workshop, rental income accrued to Lymm Baptist Church; in 1986, the former chapel was sold for £40,000 and the funds were put towards the building project.

== Architecture ==
The original, 1850, chapel (now the Ridgway Hall) has sandstone walls and a roof of slate tiles. The four-bay side walls are buttressed and have two-light windows with "nice" Decorated Gothic tracery. The original part of the Sunday school has prominent twin gables; gabled dormer windows light the later part.

In its original form, the interior had many original fittings: two rows of box pews, a timberwork roof and a stone pulpit. A shuttered archway led to a baptistery at the east end.

== Administration ==
Lymm Baptist Church's buildings are held in trust by the Baptist Union of Great Britain. The church is part of the Union's North West England region, controlled by the North Western Baptist Association. It was registered for the solemnisation of marriages on 21 November 1851. There is one Sunday morning service per week and an evening service once per month. It is also used by both church and community groups throughout the week.

== Bibliography ==
- Hartwell, Clare; Hyde, Matthew; Pevsner, Nikolaus (2011). Cheshire. The Buildings of England. London: Yale University Press. ISBN 978-0-300170-43-6.
- s.n. (1994). "A Brief History of the Fellowships of God's People meeting at Millington and subsequently at Lymm Baptist Church" (PDF). Lymm Baptist Church. Archived (PDF) from the original on 18 January 2024.
- Stell, Christopher (1994). Nonconformist Chapels and Meeting-houses in the North of England. Swindon: English Heritage. ISBN 0-11-300041-3.
