= Dan Logan =

English musician, formerly bassist of Cat the Dog

- Born: 19 December 1985 (age 40); Grantham, Lincolnshire, England
- Education: Brighton Institute Of Modern Music
- Occupations: Musician, bassist
- Years active: 2004–present

Dan Logan (born 19 December 1985) is an English musician. Formerly the bassist of Cat the Dog, he recorded and toured with The Kooks and played double bass for Brighton alt/blues band Sweet Sweet Lies as well as singing and playing all instruments in rock-a-billy side band Logan And The Faithfuls collaborating with various musicians. After a brief spell with The Lyrebirds he was bassist for a reformed The Ordinary Boys, and tech for The Maccabees. Since 2014, Logan has played bass and sung backing vocals for Chrissie Hynde. During COVID-19, he retired from music to work in finance and UK politics.

== Biography ==
Daniel Logan was born in Grantham, Lincolnshire, but was raised in Lymm, a village near Warrington, Cheshire. He was educated at home. He attended Brighton Institute Of Modern Music, where he met Daryl Pruess, Andrew Newton and Christopher Melian and together formed Cat the Dog in 2004.

The band was signed to Virgin Records after only three shows. Cat the Dog split in December 2007 after their last tour with Zico Chain.

In January 2008, Logan joined The Kooks in place of Max Rafferty, who had parted ways with the band after the completion of their album Konk but before its release. Logan played bass during sessions for RAK (the bonus disc included with the special edition of Konk), on b-sides for the "Sway" single and also a cover of "Victoria" by The Kinks that was the band's contribution to the War Child Presents Heroes charity compilation. He toured with the band in North America, Europe, Asia and Australia, and appeared in the videos for all three of the album's singles, "Always Where I Need to Be," "Shine On" and "Sway." Despite the band's lead singer Luke Pritchard stating that he enjoyed playing with Logan, by October of the same year they had recruited Pete Denton to be their bassist and full member.
