= Lymm =

Village in Cheshire, England

Coordinates: 53.383399°N 2.475034°W

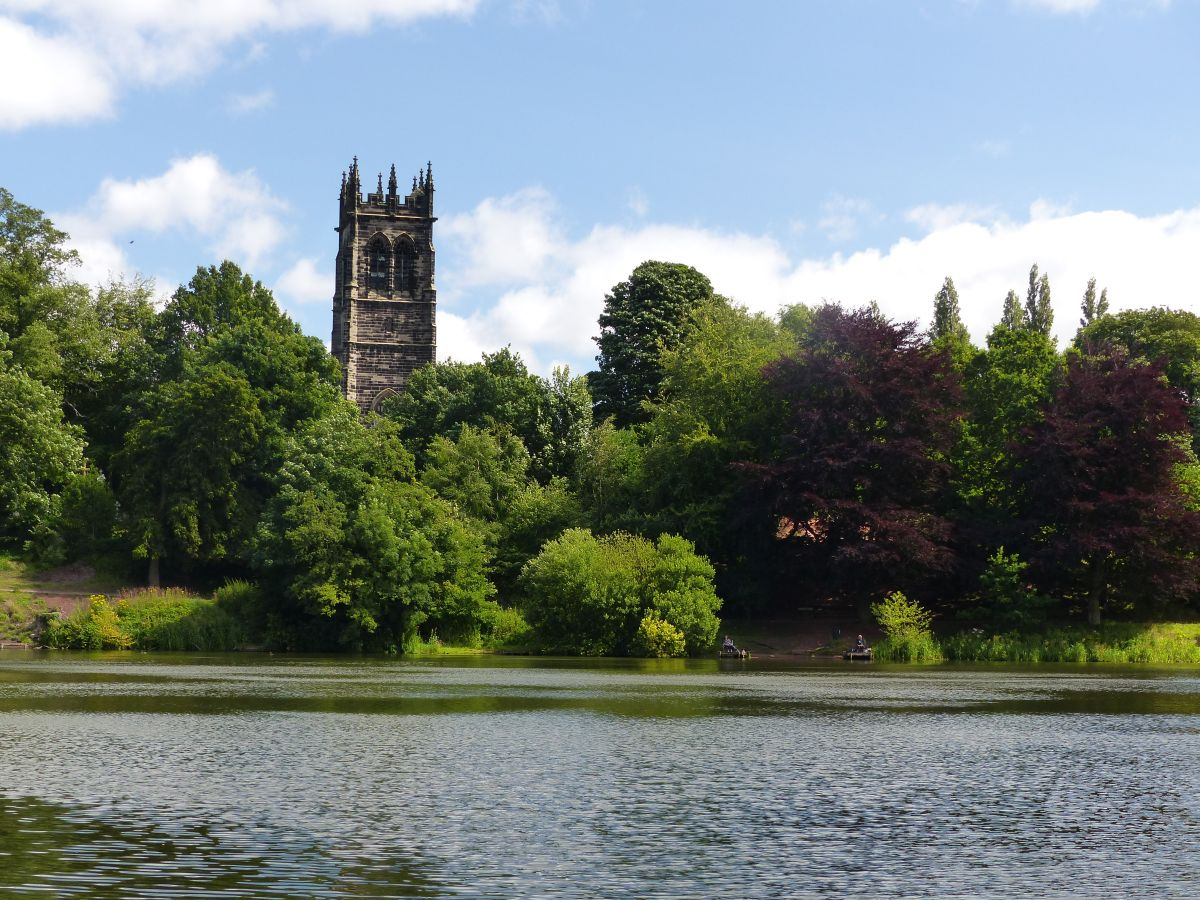
- St Mary's Church overlooking Lymm Dam

- Location within Cheshire
- Population: 12,660 (parish, 2021)
- OS grid reference: SJ685875
- Civil parish: Lymm
- Unitary authority: Warrington
- Ceremonial county: Cheshire
- Region: North West
- Country: England
- Sovereign state: United Kingdom
- Post town: Lymm
- Postcode district: WA13
- Dialling code: 01925
- Police: Cheshire
- Fire: Cheshire
- Ambulance: North West
- UK Parliament: Tatton

Lymm (/ˈlɪm/ LIM) is a village and civil parish in Cheshire, North West England, now in the Borough of Warrington. It incorporates the hamlets of Booths Hill, Broomedge, Church Green, Deansgreen, Heatley, Heatley Heath, Little Heatley, Oughtrington, Reddish, Rush Green and Statham. At the 2021 United Kingdom census, the parish comprised a population of 12,660, with the built-up area having a population of 11,545.

Situated just over a mile south of the Manchester Ship Canal and River Mersey, historically the county boundary between Lancashire and Cheshire, Lymm's neighbouring villages are Warburton, Thelwall and High Legh. Warrington is its nearest town 6 miles (9.7 km) to the west, with Altrincham being 7 miles (11 km) due east and Knutsford 9 miles (14 km) south east.

== History ==
The name Lymm is thought to have been derived from three possible meanings: the first of Celtic origin, meaning a "place of running water" and is possibly derived from an ancient brook that flows through the village centre. Another being from the Latin, limes meaning on the "limit" of the County of Chester. And finally a third is thought to come from the Old English hlimme meaning "the torrent", which possibly refers to the noise made by Slitten Brook on its course through a ravine in the middle of the village. The village appears as "Limme" in the Domesday Book of 1086.

Primarily agricultural until the Industrial Revolution, which brought the Bridgewater Canal and the Warrington and Altrincham Junction Railway, Lymm developed prominence through the salt mining, goldbeating and cotton industries (many of its inhabitants becoming fustian cutters).

Voted one of the best places to live by The Times and The Sunday Times list in 2017, Lymm was voted as one of Britain's most desirable towns by The Daily Telegraph, and third most desirable place to live in Northern England by The Telegraph in 2023.

== Governance ==
There are two tiers of local government covering Lymm, at civil parish and unitary authority level: Lymm Parish Council and Warrington Borough Council. The parish council is based at the Village Hall on Pepper Street. For national parliamentary elections, Lymm forms part of the Tatton constituency.

=== Administrative history ===
An ancient parish in the Bucklow Hundred of Cheshire, in the Late Middle Ages the Leighs seated at West Hall, High Legh became feudal lords.

Local governance in Lymm then devolved for over 500 years, divided by subinfeudation as lords of the manor or patrons of the advowson, upon their descendants the Leigh, Domville and Egerton-Warburton families until the 19th century.

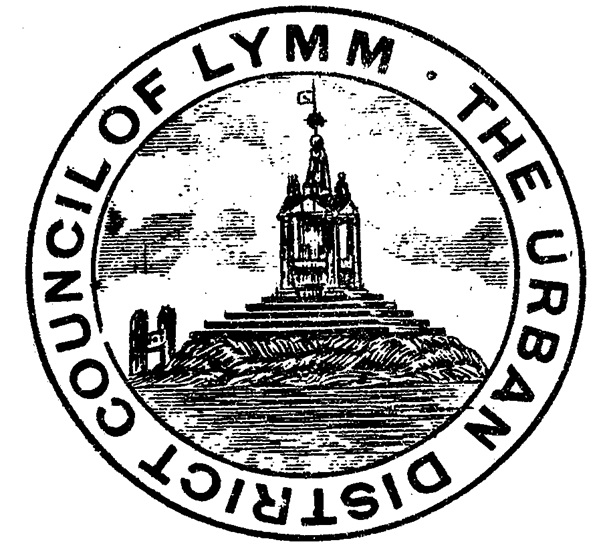
Seal of Lymm Urban District Council

The ecclesiastical parish was made a local government district in 1863, administered by an elected local board. Such districts were reconstituted as urban districts under the Local Government Act 1894. Lymm Urban District Council subsequently built itself offices at the corner of Whitbarrow Road and Brookfield Road, which were completed in 1902.

Lymm Urban District was abolished in 1974 under the Local Government Act 1972. The area became part of the Borough of Warrington. A successor parish called Lymm was created in 1974 covering the area of the former urban district. District-level functions passed to Warrington Borough Council, which became a unitary authority in 1998 when it also took over county-level services within the borough from Cheshire County Council.

== Education ==
Lymm High School accepts students from Lymm and the surrounding villages and hamlets. Judged as 'Good' by Ofsted in 2024, its sixth form was accorded 'Outstanding'. In December 2023 and 2024 The Sunday Times ranked the school as one of the top five secondary schools in North West England and one of the top secondary schools in the Warrington area. Lymm is also in the out of area catchment for Altrincham Grammar School for Boys and Altrincham Grammar School for Girls where entrance has become more competitive in recent years.

There are four primary schools within Lymm all of which received 'Good' and 'Outstanding' ratings in their recent Ofsted inspections. Three of the primary schools (Oughtrington, Ravenbank and Statham) combined as an Academy 'The Beam Education Trust' in May 2021.

Lymm is also home to Willow Tree Park School, a specialist independent school supporting vulnerable young people with complex learning, communication and sensory needs.

The Manchester Japanese School (マンチェスター日本人補習授業校 Manchesutā Nihonjin Hoshū Jugyō Kō), a weekend Japanese educational programme, is held at the Language Centre at Lymm High School.

== Culture and heritage ==
Lymm Heritage Centre opened in June 2017 at 1 Legh Street and hosts exhibitions related to local history as well as activities for schools and visitors.

Morris dancing has taken place since at least the Civil War at Lymm, first being recorded in 1817 then becoming organised to celebrate rushbearing during the Victorian era. Lymm Morris Dancers perform annually at the Feast of St Mary the Virgin, patron saint of Lymm Church, as well as other village fairs throughout the year, such as the Lymm Festival, Lymm May Queen Festival and Lymm Dickensian Festival.

Lymm is twinned with Meung-sur-Loire in France, an ancient village now a Commune near Orléans.

== Landmarks ==
Lymm village centre is a designated conservation area, notable for its historic buildings, both listed and unlisted including the French-style terracotta former town hall, St Peter's Church and Lymm Hall.

Nearby is Oughtrington Hall (seat of the Trafford Leigh family until 1862), now Lymm High School. Old Sir George Booth acquired land to build the original half-timbered Elizabethan Foxley Hall for John Booth, cousin of the celebrated Cheshire Genealogist John Booth of Twemlow Hall. Falling into disrepair by the mid 18th century, Foxley House was rebuilt in the early 19th century by Thomas Brigham (1798–1864), before ownership passed to the Carlisle family.

St Mary's Church, Lymm, overlooking Lymm Dam and dating back to 1521, was rebuilt in the 19th century after falling into disrepair. The parish church of St Peter, Oughtrington completed in 1872, is an example of Gothic Revival architecture. Lymm Baptist Church was built in 1850 with a Sunday school added in 1851.

Lymm Cross, known locally simply as The Cross, is a Grade I-listed structure dating from the 17th century, restored in 1897.

A "dinosaur" (reptile) footprint discovered during the Victorian era at one of Lymm's many sandstone quarries and thought to date from the Triassic period, is now on display in the centre of the village.

Spud Wood, a recreational area, is located next to the Bridgewater Canal and managed by the Woodland Trust. In 2014 Oughtrington Community Centre was granted a licence to run a wood allotment scheme where local residents can coppice and fell wood. There is also a community orchard located in grounds behind Oughtrington Community Centre.

== Transport ==
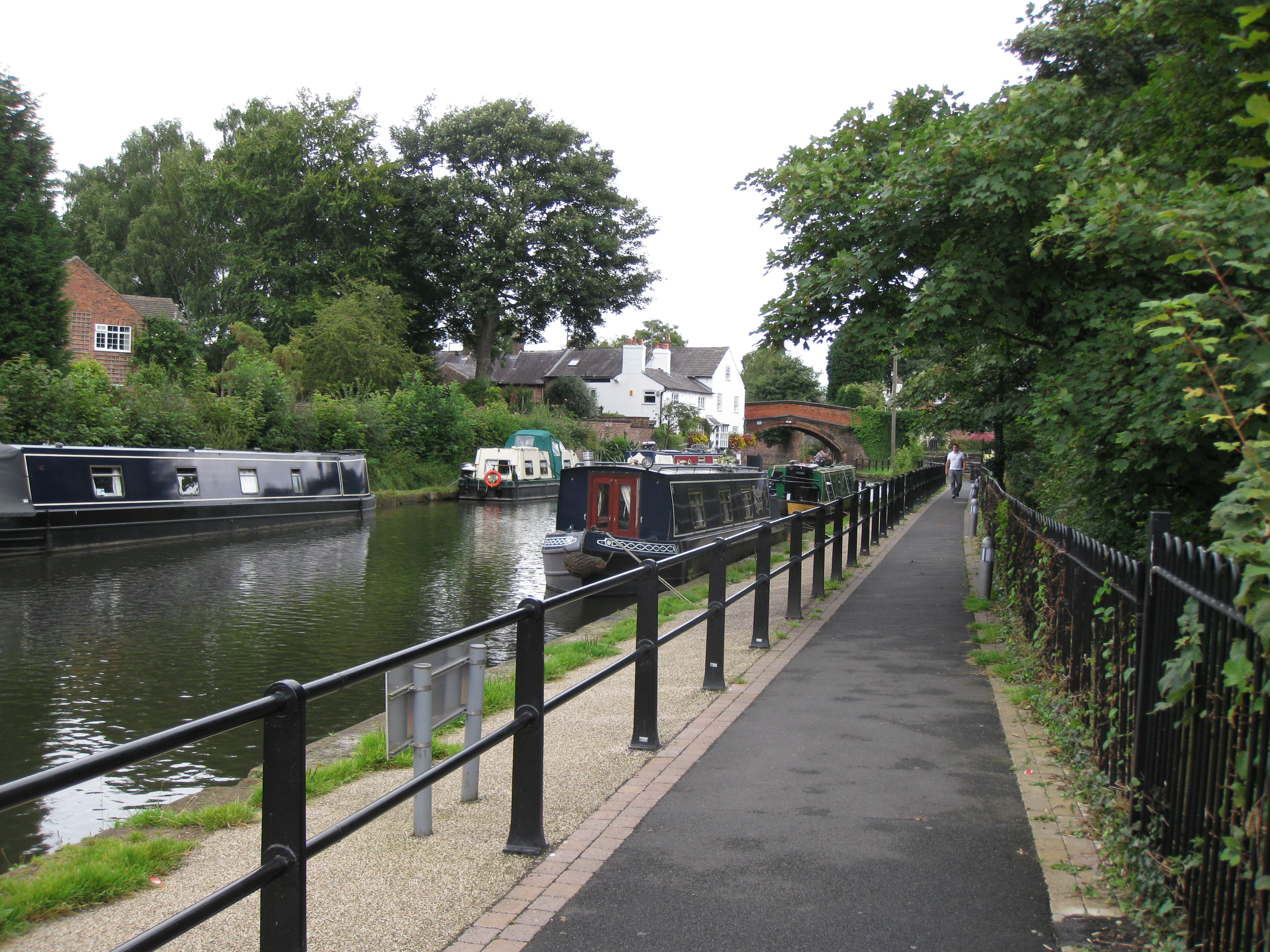
The Bridgewater Canal at Lymm

The M56 (junctions 7, 8 and 9) and M6 (junction 19 and 20) motorways are both within 3 miles (4.8 km) of Lymm. The conjunction of these motorways with the A50 is known as the Lymm Interchange, and hosts a service station known as the Poplar 2000 services, a well-used truck stop. The A56 also passes just south of the village, connecting the nearby towns of Warrington and Altrincham. The CAT5/5A buses to Lymm from Warrington and Altrincham are frequent on weekdays and Saturdays.

Lymm Historic Transport Day is an annual summer festival celebrating various modes of transport, from canal boats to vintage vehicles, which takes place in the village on the May Queen field.

=== Waterways ===
The Bridgewater Canal passes through the centre of Lymm. The Manchester Ship Canal passes to the north, and beyond its route lies the River Mersey. To the east of Lymm the River Bollin flows along the village's border with Warburton and the Borough of Trafford. A number of small brooks feed the popular tourist attraction of Lymm Dam, built in 1824 to enable the construction of the Stockport–Warrington Road (now known as the A56).

=== Railways ===
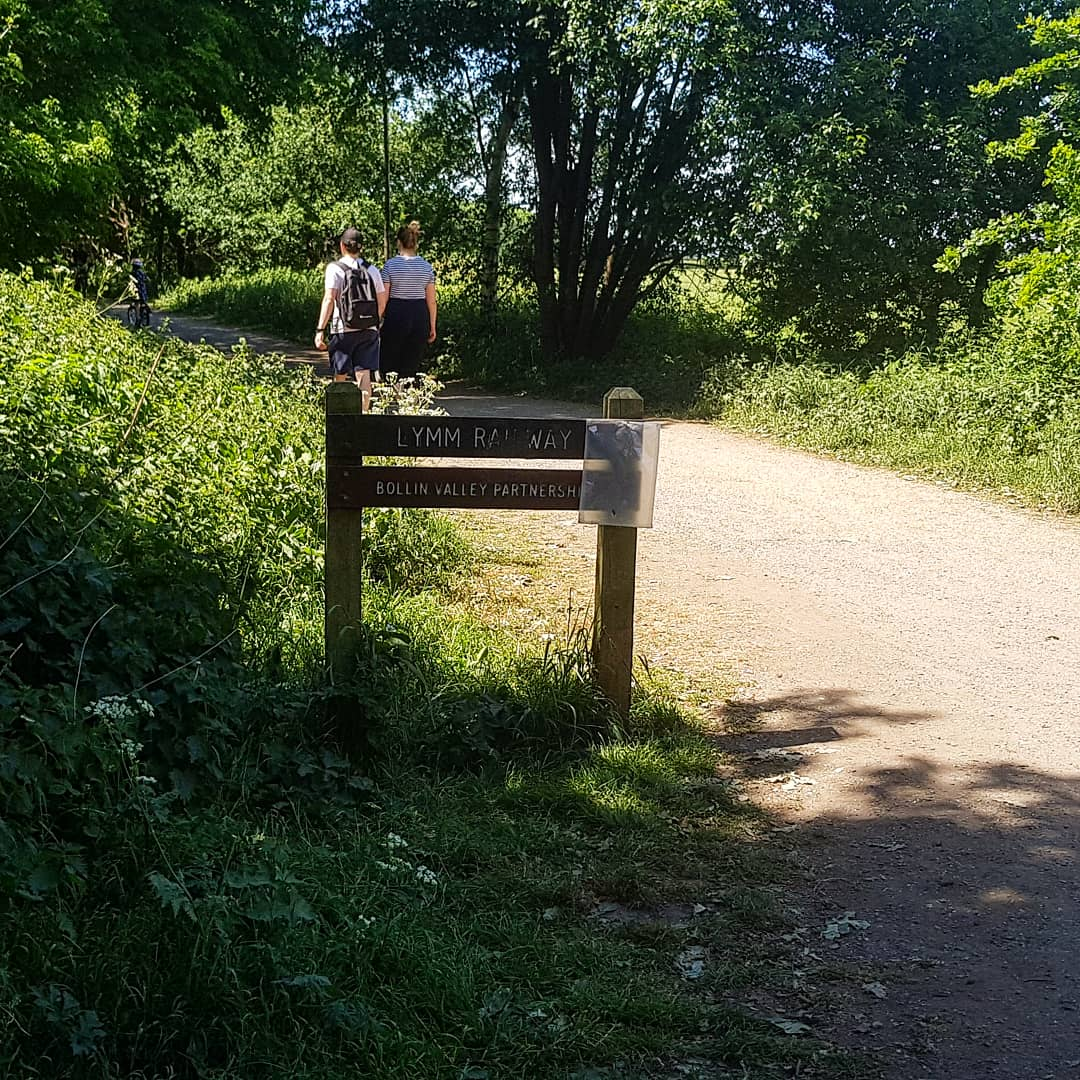
Former railway now the Trans Pennine Trail

Lymm railway station was on Whitbarrow Road. It opened on 1 November 1853 as part of the Warrington and Altrincham Junction Railway. There was a further station at Heatley, on Mill Lane, for salt and lead. To the east, the track ran via Dunham into Broadheath and the Manchester network. To the west, the track used to run into Warrington, via Latchford, and the tar processing on Loushers Lane, then into Bank Quay Low Level.

The line closed to passengers on 10 September 1962, part of the Beeching cuts, and officially closed to all types of traffic on 7 July 1985 but remained operational for a few months afterwards. After it became financially unviable, and the tracks and sleepers were rapidly lifted. Lymm today has no railway station; the closest stations are at Glazebrook, Birchwood, Warrington Central, Knutsford and Altrincham Interchange.

=== Buses ===
Buses are run by Warrington's Own Buses and Diamond North West under the Bee Network franchise.

=== Cycleways ===
Today the old railway through Lymm forms a good stretch of the Trans Pennine Trail, with a ranger station at Statham, near the centre of the village. In 2022, upgrade work to certain sections of the trail commenced to provide updated all-weather surfaces for cyclists and walkers.

== Demography ==
Census population of Lymm parish
Census	Population	Female	Male	Households	Source
2001	10,552	5,431	5,121	4,426	
2011	12,350	6,319	6,031	5,171	
2021	12,661	6,594	6,067	5,311	

== RAF Air Cadets ==
2137 (Lymm) Squadron of the RAF Air Cadets was formed in 1964 as part of the programme to re-establish units closed after the Second World War. Having been established on Park Road at Broomedge in a wooden spooner hut, in 2015 this was demolished to make way for a new £300,000 facility which was opened in 2016.

== Sport ==
Association football is played in Lymm, with Lymm Rovers F.C. hosting adult and junior teams and another junior team Lymm Piranhas J.F.C..

Lymm RFC fields four Rugby union teams on a regular basis.

Angling at Lymm Dam and at several other fisheries including Heatley Mere and Meadow View is represented by Lymm Angling Club.

Other sports facilities in Lymm are :

- Lymm Croquet Club
- Lymm Golf Club
- Lymm Lawn Tennis Club
- Lymm Oughtrington Park Cricket Club – whose home ground is in the former grounds of Oughtrington Hall, formerly seat of a Leigh cadet family
- Lymm Leisure Centre, which is next door to the cricket club at Lymm High School – has a swimming pool, badminton court and gym facilities
- Oughtrington Bowling Club hosts Crown Green Bowling on Stage Lane, being established for over a century;

Athletics clubs include (Lymm Velo Club), triathlon (Cheshire CAT) and for running (Lymm Runners).

Cheshire Forest Hunt and Tarporley Hunt Club are nearby and clay pigeon shooting can be found at the Star Gun Club in Lymm.

== Notable people ==
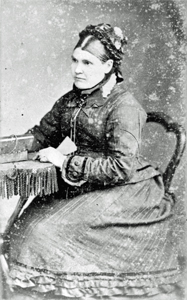
Elizabeth Pulman

- Donald Adamson (1939–2024), literary scholar and historian, brought up in Oughtrington
- Tim Booth (born 1960), lead singer for James, lives in Lymm
- Ian Brown (born 1963), former lead singer for The Stone Roses, lives in Lymm
- Aiden Byrne (born 1972), English chef and star of Great British Menu, owns The Church Green in Lymm
- Matthew Corbett (born 1948), Sooty puppeteer, lived for many years in The White House on the Bridgewater Canal
- Gerard Dewhurst (1872–1956), cotton merchant and banker, played football once for England in 1895; grew up at Oughtrington Hall in Lymm
- Alex Dodd (1946 in Lymm – 2016), campaigner for children's rights; mother of politicians Edward and James Timpson
- Ruth Lea, Baroness Lea of Lymm (born 1947), political economist
- Dan Logan (born 1985), English musician, brought up in Lymm
- Ralph Slazenger Moss (1845 in Lymm – 1910), in 1881 with his brother Albert (1857–1940), founded British sports equipment brand Slazenger
- Miya Ocego (born 2000), trans-actor and model, grew up in Lymm
- Elizabeth Chadd (1836 in Lymm – 1900), British-born New Zealand photographer, the country's first female professional photographer, emigrated 1861
- Cicely Fox Smith (1882 in Lymm – 1954), English poet and writer
- Sir John Stalker (1939–2019), former Deputy Chief Constable of Greater Manchester Police, lived in Lymm
- Robert Westall (1929–1993 in Lymm), author, lived locally and bought local writing office using royalties from his children's books.

=== Sport ===
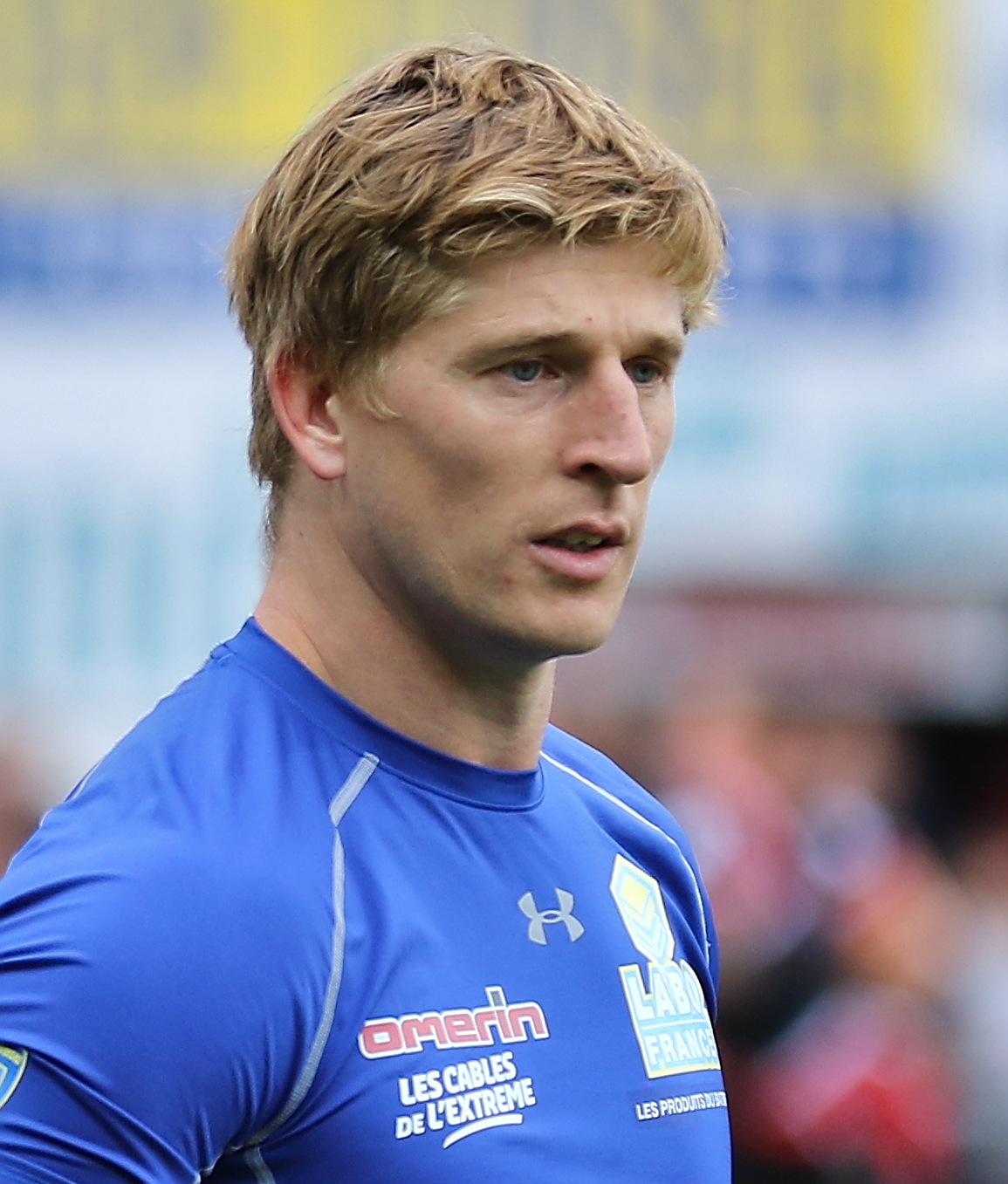
David Strettle

- Kenneth Carlisle (1882 in Lymm – 1967), cricketer active from 1903 to 1905 who played for Oxford University
- Alex Mitchell (born 1997), pro-rugby player, lives in Lymm
- Wanda Morgan (1910–1995), British golfer; won The Women's Amateur Championship in 1935
- Andrew Murray (born 1956), English pro-golfer, lives in Lymm
- Tom Murray (born 1990), pro-golfer, lives in Lymm
- David Strettle (born 1983 in Lymm), Saracens F.C. rugby union player
- Harry Worley (born 1988 in Lymm), retired footballer, played 140 pro. games, including 62 for Oxford United F.C.

== In popular culture ==
The 2011 television series Candy Cabs and the 2015 Sky 1 television series After Hours were filmed in Lymm. A scene from Paul Abbott's television series No Offence was filmed in Lymm in 2014.

Lymm has its own radio station, Cheshire's Mix 56, established in 2020, broadcasting 24 hours a day and run by volunteers.

== See also ==
- Listed buildings in Lymm
