= Gerard Dewhurst =

English footballer and businessman (1872 – 1956)

Personal information
- Full name: Gerard Powys Dewhurst
- Date of birth: 14 February 1872
- Place of birth: London, England
- Date of death: 29 March 1956 (aged 84)
- Place of death: Ruthin, Wales
- Position: Inside forward

Senior career*
Years	Team	Apps	(Gls)
- Liverpool Ramblers
1892–1895	Corinthian		
1894	Liverpool	1	(0)

International career
1895	England	1	(0)
- * Club domestic league appearances and goals

Gerard Powys Dewhurst J.P. (14 February 1872 – 29 March 1956; sometimes referred to as Gerald Powys Dewhurst) was an English cotton merchant and banker. He was also an amateur footballer, and earned one international cap for England in 1895, playing as an inside forward.

== Early and personal life ==
Born in London, he was the son of George Bakewell Dewhurst and Frances Ada Dewhurst (née Mann). He grew up at Oughtrington Hall in Lymm, Cheshire, and was educated at Repton School, where he was a member of the school football XI in 1889 and 1890, and Trinity College, Cambridge. While at Cambridge, he earned a "blue" in 1892, 1893 and 1894.

In 1897 he married Mary Brougham, by whom he had two sons.

== Football career ==
Dewhurst played for Liverpool Ramblers and the Corinthians as an amateur, and also played one game for Liverpool against Crewe Alexandra on 24 March 1894. He made 32 appearances for the Corinthians between 1892 and 1895, scoring 18 goals.

He earned one cap for England in a British Home Championship against Wales on 18 March 1895, whilst registered as a Liverpool Ramblers player. All eleven England players were members of the Corinthian club and were expected to produce an easy victory; in the event, Wales proved stronger than expected and the match ended in a 1–1 draw with Rupert Sandilands equalizing shortly after Wales took the lead through Billy Lewis.

== Business career ==
Dewhurst joined his family cotton trading firm, Geo. & R. Dewhurst Ltd. of Manchester, becoming Chairman and Managing Director. He was also Chairman of the Vulcan Insurance Company of Manchester, a director of the London Assurance Corporation and a member of the Manchester Royal Exchange. He later worked as a banker with Williams Deacon's Bank, becoming Chairman, and as a director of The Royal Bank of Scotland.

He served as Justice of the Peace for Denbighshire.

The Great Central Railway named one of its GCR Class 11F "Improved Director" steam locomotives after him, No. 507 (later L.N.E.R. No. 5507 and B.R. No. 62661).
