= Dunham Massey railway station =

Former railway station in Greater Manchester, England

Coordinates: 53.3928°N 2.4125°W

Dunham Massey
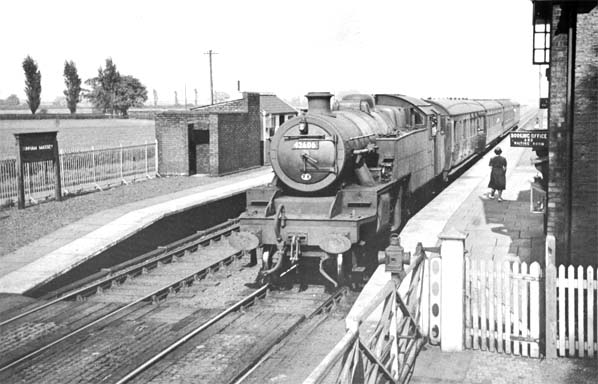

General information
- Location: Dunham Massey, Metropolitan Borough of Trafford; England
- Grid reference: SJ728885
- Platforms: 2

Other information
- Status: Disused

History
- Original company: Warrington and Stockport Railway
- Pre-grouping: London and North Western Railway
- Post-grouping: London Midland and Scottish Railway; London Midland Region of British Railways

Key dates
- 1 November 1854: Opened as Warburton
- June 1856: Renamed Warburton and Dunham
- October 1856: Renamed Dunham
- April 1861: Renamed Dunham Massey
- 10 September 1962: Closed
Location

Dunham Massey railway station was a stop on the Warrington and Altrincham Junction Railway. It served the village of Dunham Massey, in Cheshire (now Greater Manchester), England. The station opened in 1854 and closed in 1962.

== History ==
The Warrington and Altrincham Junction Railway (W&AJR) built its railway line from Warrington Arpley to Skelton Junction, via Latchford and Lymm, during 1852–53 and passenger train services commenced on 1 November 1853. There were six intermediate stations provided along the line's length including that at Dunham Massey, which was opened in June 1854. The station was located on the south side of Henshall Lane.

The station was named Warburton from its opening until June 1856 when it became Warburton and Dunham. In October 1856, it was renamed Dunham; it finally became Dunham Massey in April 1861, which was retained until closure.

The W&AJR changed its name to the Warrington and Stockport Railway on 4 August 1853, before the line was completed and that company was absorbed into the London and North Western Railway (LNWR) on 15 July 1867.

The LNWR was amalgamated into the London Midland and Scottish Railway (LMS) on 1 January 1923. The LMS continued to operate the passenger train service through Dunham Massey but, by July 1946, only eight trains per day in each direction stopped at the station. LMS was nationalised on 1 January 1948 and operations on the line were vested in British Railways' London Midland Region (LMR). In January 1956, the service to Dunham Massey was eight trains in each direction, with the fare for the eleven miles single journey to Manchester being 1s 7d (8p).

Passenger services along the line were withdrawn and the station was closed by British Railways on 10 September 1962. Freight trains continued to use the line until 7 July 1985, when the need for extensive repairs to the Latchford Viaduct caused the line to be closed.

The last Station Master before the station was decommissioned in 1962 was Warrington born, Frank Bonnell. Who along with his wife, Evelyn, bought the property and lived there until their deaths in 1980 and 2009, respectively. They had 3 children, Patricia, Maureen and Jennifer.

Pictures of Evelyn can be found on some of the information boards, on the trail.

After purchasing the station, an extension at the rear of the property was built and it became a 3 bedroomed family home that remained in the family until 2024.

Frank & Evelyn were both cremated at Dunham Massey Crematorium and are their plots can be found at Dunham Massey Cemetery.

== Services ==
The main LNWR train service through Dunham Massey station was from Liverpool Lime Street via Warrington Arpley to Broadheath, where trains joined the Manchester South Junction and Altrincham Railway and continued via Sale to Manchester London Road. In July 1922, the LNWR operated fifteen passenger trains in each direction on weekdays, with eleven of these serving the full length of the line between Liverpool and Manchester.

| Preceding station | Disused railways | Following station |
|---|---|---|
| Heatley & Warburton | LNWR; Warrington & Stockport Railway | Broadheath |

== The site today ==
The station building survives in use as a domestic dwelling and the trackbed forms part of the Trans Pennine Trail.
