= Warrington Wilderspool railway station =

Disused railway station in Warrington, Cheshire

Warrington Wilderspool
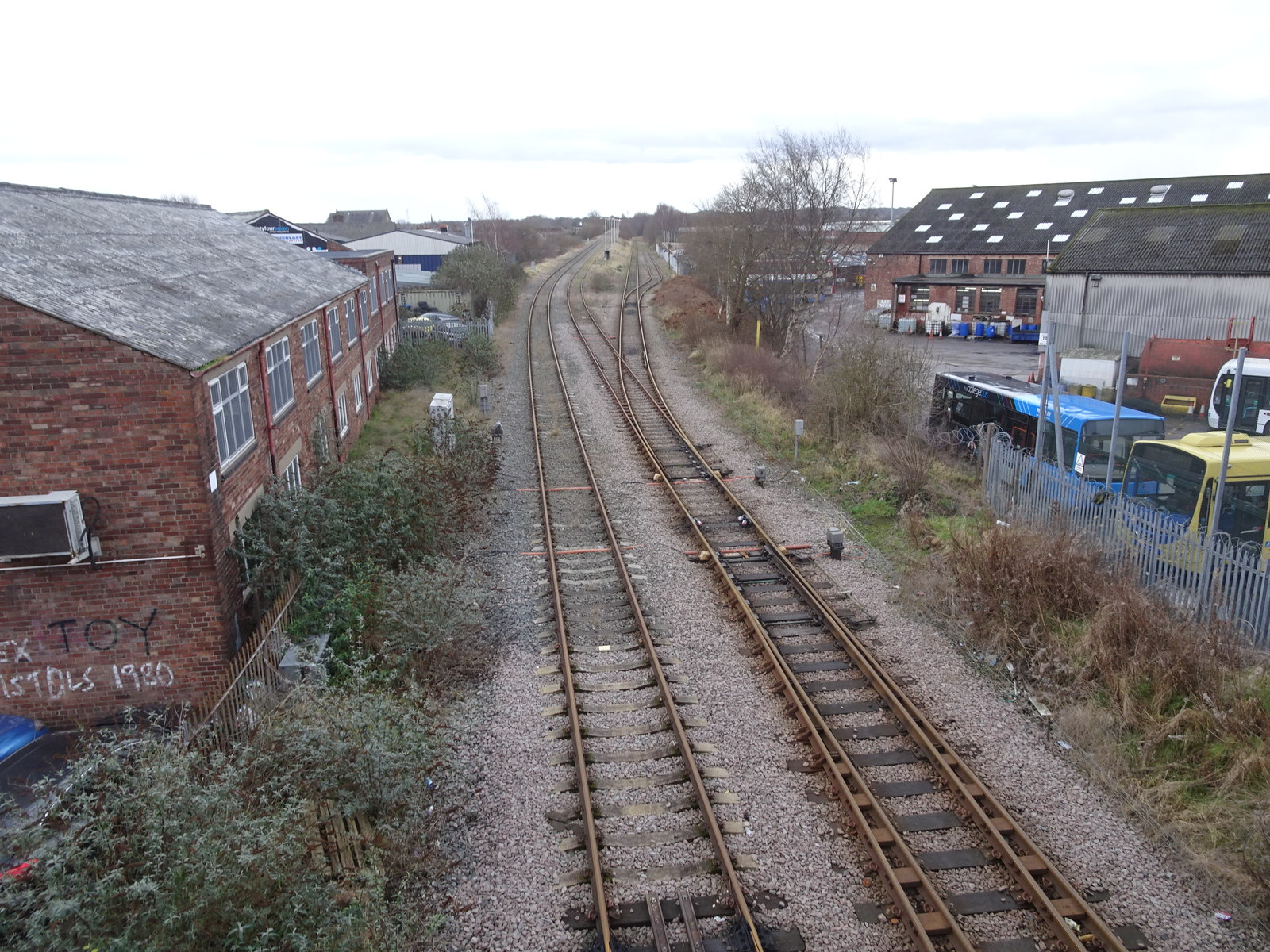
- The site of the station in 2020

General information
- Location: Warrington, Cheshire; England
- Coordinates: 53.3838°N 2.5908°W
- Grid reference: SJ608876
- Platforms: 1

Other information
- Status: Disused

History
- Original company: Warrington and Stockport Railway
- Pre-grouping: London and North Western Railway

Key dates
- 1 November 1853: Opened
- 1 May 1854: Closed
- 16 November 1868: Reopened
- 1 October 1871: Closed permanently
Location

Warrington Wilderspool railway station served the town of Warrington, historically in Lancashire, England, from 1853 to 1871 on the Warrington and Stockport Railway.

== History ==
The station was opened on 1 November 1853 by the Warrington and Stockport Railway. It was situated on the east side of Wilderspool Causeway bridge. It was a temporary station that was intended to be used until the Mersey bridge was completed. It was completed on 1 May 1854 and Warrington Arpley opened on the same day. The station closed on this day but it reopened on 16 November 1868 as a ticket platform. Warrington Bank Quay also opened on this day. It was decided that the distance between the two stations meant that Wilderspool wasn't sustainable so it closed on 1 October 1871 when Warrington Arpley reopened.

Preceding station	Disused railways	Following station
Latchford; Line and station closed	Warrington and Stockport Railway	Terminus
