= Cat the Dog =

English indie rock band

Cat the Dog were an English indie rock band formed in Brighton, East Sussex, in 2005, consisting of Chris Melian (vocals/guitar), Andy Newton (drums), Dan Logan (bass guitar), and Daryl Pruess (lead guitar), all of whom attended Brighton Institute of Modern Music.

Chris Melian and Andy Newton moved in 2004 from Toronto to England. The band signed with Virgin Records after only three shows and BMG Music Publishing signed Cat the Dog to a long-term publishing deal. They were managed by Rob Swerdlow, Mark Nicholson and Dave Nicoll, who are also behind fellow Brighton band The Kooks.

Cat the Dog supported The Automatic and The Kooks, and recorded with producer Jack Douglas at Hook End Studios in Reading. They released singles "I'm a Romantic" and "Gotta Leave", and managed to get airplay on MTV's Spankin' New Music. In November 2007 the band were involved in a near fatal car crash while travelling to their gig and had to escape from their van by breaking a window and climbing out. They soon split up in December 2007 after a tour with Zico Chain.

Immediately after the split, in January 2008 bassist Dan Logan briefly joined The Kooks in place of Max Rafferty; the latter would then form The Third Man with Cat the Dog drummer Andy Newton. In 2009, Cat the Dog vocalist Chris Melian joined the group The Hot Melts.
