= Burford Lane Farmhouse =

- Location in Cheshire
- 53.3767°N 2.4453°W
- OS grid reference: SJ 7048 8675

History
- Built for: George C. Dewhurst

Site notes
- Architect: John Douglas

Listed Building – Grade II
- Designated: 14 June 1984
- Reference no.: 1226461

Burford Lane Farmhouse is in Burford Lane in the village of Oughtrington, near Lymm, Cheshire, England. It is recorded in the National Heritage List for England as a designated Grade II listed building.

The farmhouse was designed by the Chester architect John Douglas for George C. Dewhurst and built in 1866. It is constructed in brown brick with some timber framing and a grey slate roof. It is considered to be "one of the earliest identified farmhouses by Douglas" which "shows his neo-vernacular style in course of development".

== See also ==
- Listed buildings in Lymm
- List of houses and associated buildings by John Douglas
