= Lymm Cross =

Grade I listed building in the United Kingdom

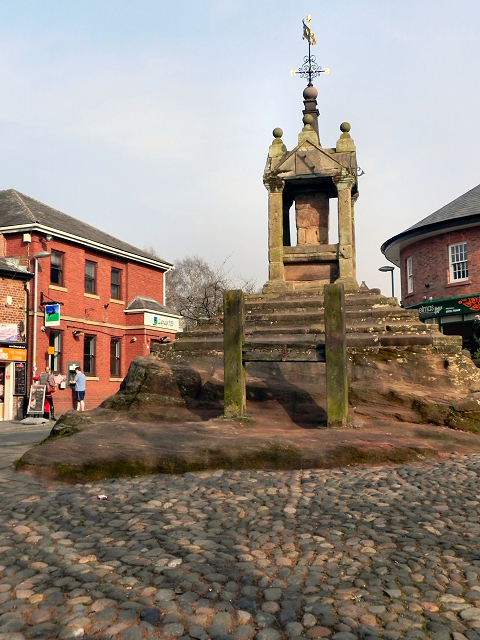
- Lymm Cross and stocks

- Location in Cheshire
- 53.3811°N 2.4776°W
- Location: Lymm, Cheshire, England
- OS grid reference: SJ 683 872

History
- Built: 17th century

Site notes
- Restored: 1897

Listed Building – Grade I
- Designated: 24 January 1950
- Reference no.: 1227014

Lymm Cross is in the village of Lymm, Warrington, Cheshire, England. It is recorded in the National Heritage List for England as a designated Grade I listed building.

The cross dates from the early to mid-17th century and was restored in 1897. It is constructed of sandstone and stands on an artificially stepped natural outcrop of red sandstone. Its shaft stands in a square pavilion of red sandstone with square corner pillars. It has a stone roof with a pedimented gable to each face and ball finials. Above the cross is an extension which carries a stone ball and an ornate weather vane. On the east, south and west gables are bronze sundials of 1897 carrying the inscriptions "We are a Shadow", "Save Time" and "Think of the Last".

The adjacent stocks are separately Grade II listed.

== See also ==
- Grade I listed buildings in Cheshire
- Listed buildings in Lymm
