= St Peter's Church, Oughtrington =

Coordinates: 53.3803°N 2.4609°W

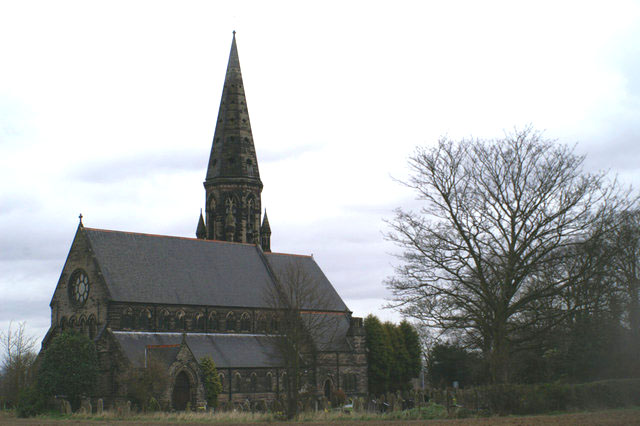
- St Peter's Church, Oughtrington

- Location in Cheshire
- OS grid reference: SJ 694 872
- Location: Oughtrington, Lymm, Cheshire
- Country: England
- Denomination: Anglican
- Website: https://www.oughtringtonchurch.co.uk

History
- Status: Parish church
- Dedication: St Peter
- Consecrated: 1872

Architecture
- Functional status: Active
- Heritage designation: Grade II
- Designated: 14 June 1984
- Architect(s): Slater and Carpenter
- Architectural type: Church
- Style: Gothic Revival
- Groundbreaking: 1871
- Completed: 1872

Specifications
- Length: 106 feet (32 m)
- Height: 54 feet (16 m)
- Materials: Grey sandstone, grey slate roofs

Administration
- Province: York
- Diocese: Chester
- Archdeaconry: Macclesfield
- Deanery: Bowdon
- Parish: St Peter, Oughtrington

Clergy
- Rector: Michael Burgess

St Peter's Church is the parish church of Lymm in Warrington, Cheshire, England. The church is recorded in the National Heritage List for England as a designated Grade II listed building. It is an active Anglican parish church in the diocese of Chester, the archdeaconry of Macclesfield and the deanery of Bowdon. Its benefice is combined with that of St Werburgh, Warburton.

== History ==
The church was built in 1871–72 at the expense of C. G. Dewhurst, the architects being Slater and Carpenter. Initially a chapel of ease in the parish of St Mary's Church, Lymm, it became a separate parish in 1881. In 1932 a Lady Chapel was created in the north aisle to celebrate the jubilee.

== Architecture ==
It is built in grey snecked rubble sandstone with grey slate roofs. Its plan consists of a five-bay nave with a clerestory, north and south aisles, an apsidal chancel, a south vestry, a south porch and a northeast tower with a spire. At the west end is a rose window above four lancet windows. The tower has a square base over which is an octagonal belfry surrounded by pinnacles, and a stone spire. The authors of the Buildings of England series consider that the spire is too thin for such a substantial church and that the pinnacles are "unjustifiable". The stained glass in the apse, dated 1894, and in one of the windows in the south aisle is by Kempe, and the stained glass in the windows at the west end, dated 1907, is by A. K. Nicholson.

== External features ==
The churchyard contains the war grave of a soldier of World War I, east of the church.

== See also ==
- Listed buildings in Lymm
