= Broadheath (Altrincham) railway station =

Disused railway station in Cheshire, England

Broadheath (Altrincham)
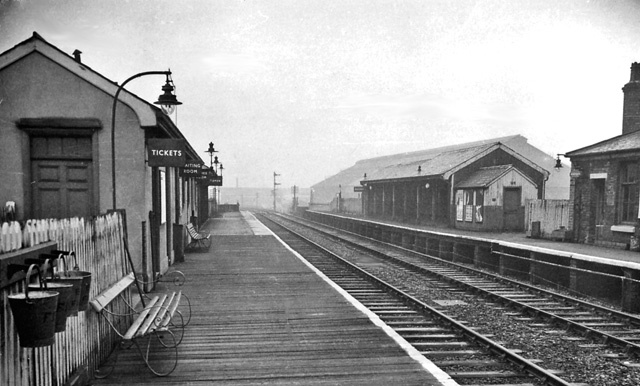
- The station in 1962

General information
- Location: Broadheath, Trafford; England
- Coordinates: 53.3994°N 2.3538°W
- Grid reference: SJ765892
- Platforms: 2

Other information
- Status: Disused

History
- Original company: Warrington and Stockport Railway
- Pre-grouping: London and North Western Railway
- Post-grouping: London, Midland and Scottish Railway

Key dates
- 1 November 1853: Opened as Altrincham
- November 1856: Renamed Broadheath (Altrincham)
- 10 September 1962: Closed
Location

Broadheath (Altrincham) railway station served Broadheath and the northern part of Altrincham in Cheshire, England, between its opening in 1853 and closure in 1962.

== Station construction, opening and ownership ==
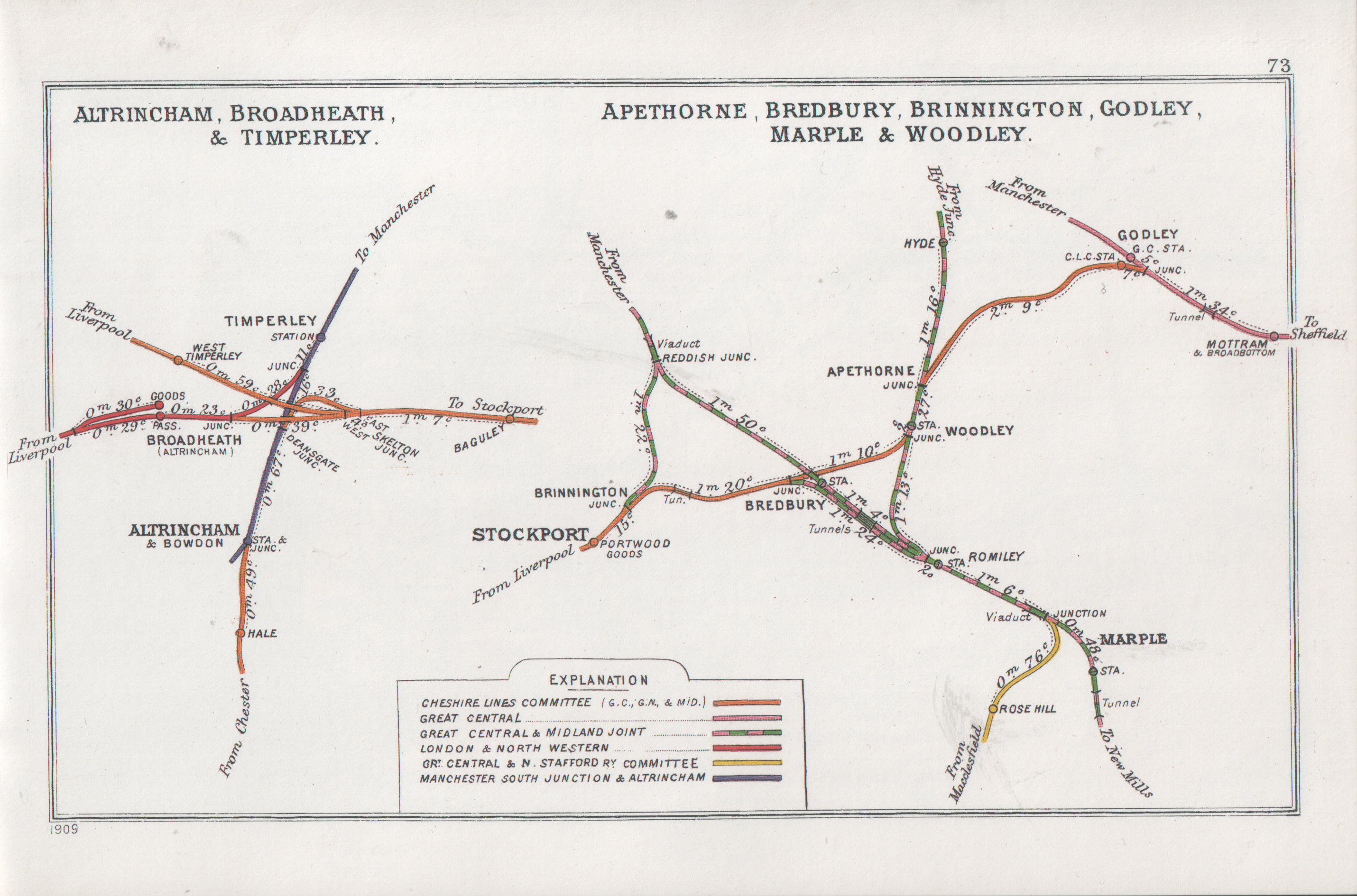
A 1909 Railway Clearing House Junction Diagram showing (left) railways in the vicinity of Broadheath (Altrincham). Diagram includes the goods station and the junction to the east where the LNWR line to Manchester London Road swung north and the CLC line continued east to Stockport.

The station was built by the Warrington and Altrincham Junction Railway, which changed its name to the Warrington and Stockport Railway (W&SR) shortly before the station was opened on 1 November 1853. Initially the name used was Altrincham W & S, but this was changed to Broadheath (Altrincham) in November 1856. The W&SR was incorporated in the London and North Western Railway (LNWR) on 15 July 1867. The LNWR was merged into the London Midland and Scottish Railway on 1 January 1923.

== Location and facilities ==
The station was situated on an embankment immediately to the west of the A56 Manchester Road, which the line crossed on an overbridge at the junction with Viaduct Road, and 100 yards (90 m) north of the A56 bridge over the Bridgewater Canal. The line had two sets of railway tracks, with platforms at each. The northern platform served trains to Manchester and the southern platform served trains to Lymm and Warrington Arpley.

== Completion of railway lines serving Broadheath station ==
The line from Warrington Arpley was opened to Broadheath on 1 November 1853. An extension from Broadheath to meet the Manchester South Junction and Altrincham Railway (MSJAR) was opened on 1 May 1854. Parliamentary approval was obtained by the W&S for an extension to Stockport, but financial problems meant that this was never completed. The Cheshire Lines Committee completed their line from Stockport Tiviot Dale to Skelton Junction on 1 December 1865 and a CLC extension to meet the LNWR line at Broadheath Junction was completed on 1 February 1866.

== Train services from Broadheath station ==
From 1854 onwards, the LNWR operated local passenger trains from Liverpool Lime Street and Warrington Arpley, through Broadheath to Manchester. The 1922 railway timetable showed fifteen trains each weekday from Broadheath to Manchester London Road, where the trains terminated in the MSJAR platforms, having run along MSJAR rails from Broadheath Junction. The journey took between 25 and 33 minutes, depending on the number of intermediate stations served by the specific train. Trains to Liverpool Lime Street took ninety minutes with up to fifteen intermediate stops. Passenger services ceased on 10 September 1962.

Preceding station	Disused railways	Following station
Dunham Massey; Line and station closed	LNWR; Warrington & Stockport Railway	Timperley; Line closed, station open
Dunham Massey; Line and station closed	LNWR; Warrington & Stockport Railway	Baguley; Line and station closed
