= Thelwall railway station =

Former railway station in England

Coordinates: 53.3796°N 2.5203°W

Thelwall

General information
- Location: Thelwall, Warrington; England
- Grid reference: SJ655871
- Platforms: 2

Other information
- Status: Disused

History
- Original company: Warrington and Stockport Railway
- Pre-grouping: London and North Western Railway
- Post-grouping: London, Midland and Scottish Railway; London Midland Region (British Railways)

Key dates
- June 1854: Opened
- 17 September 1956: Closed
Location

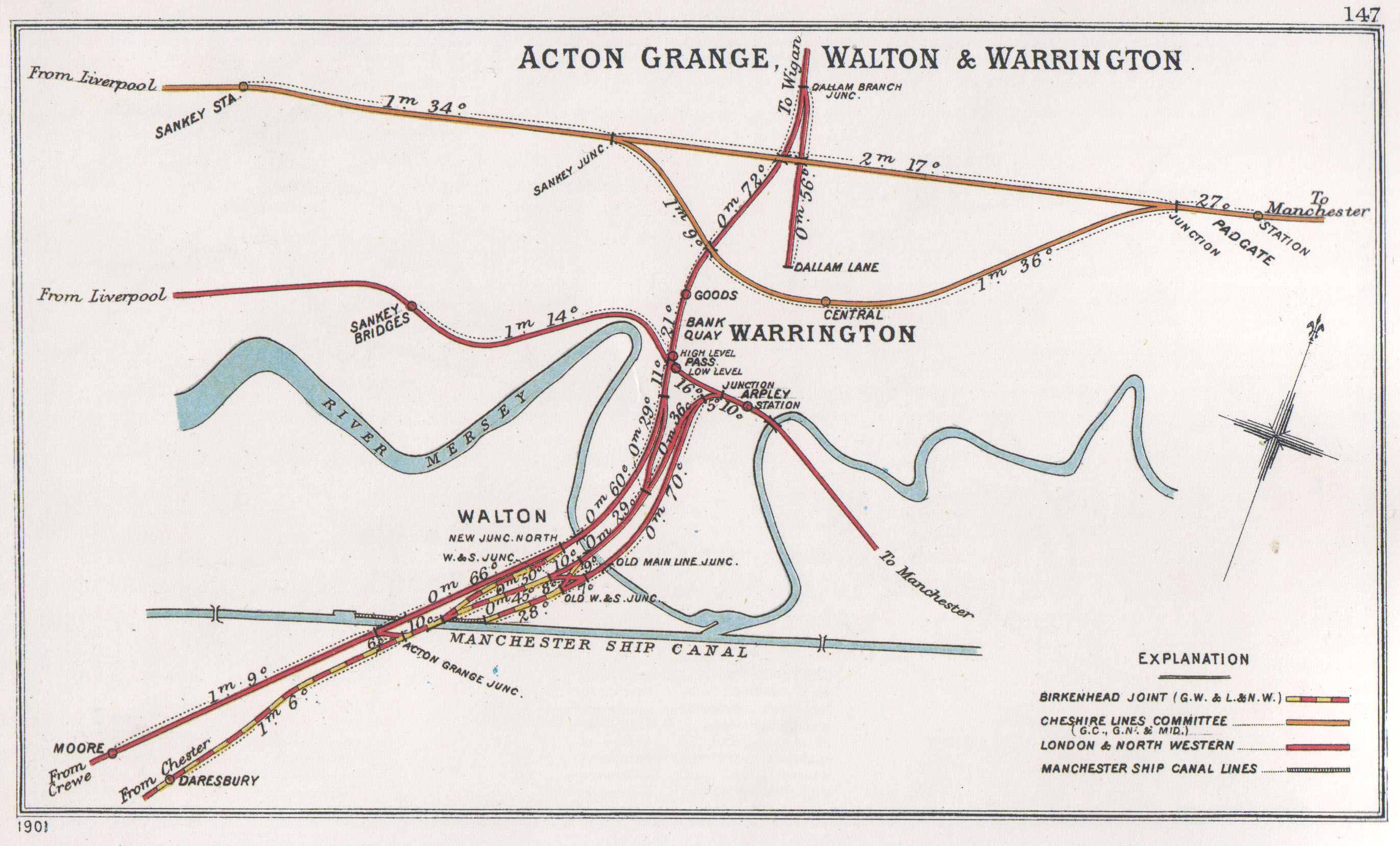
Map showing Warrington Arpley

Thelwall railway station was a station to the south of Stockport Road A56 road, Thelwall, England, at the junction of St Helens Railway and Warrington and Stockport Railway. It opened in June 1854; and it closed to passengers on 17 September 1956. Both railways were absorbed by the LNWR; the station was on the southmost Liverpool to Manchester line.

Preceding station	Disused railways	Following station
Latchford	London and North Western Railway; Warrington & Stockport Railway	Lymm
