= Elizabeth Pulman =

New Zealand photographer (1836–1900)

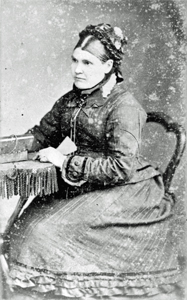
- Born: Elizabeth Chadd; 1 August 1836; Lymm, United Kingdom
- Died: 3 February 1900 (aged 63); Auckland, New Zealand
- Known for: Photography
- Spouses: George Pulman (m. 1859–1871) John Blackman (m. 1875–1893)

Elizabeth Pulman née Chadd (1 August 1836 – 3 February 1900) was a British-born New Zealand photographer. She is regarded as one of New Zealand's first female professional photographers.

== Biography ==
Pulman was born in on 1 August 1836 in Lymm, Cheshire, England. She married husband George Pulman in Manchester in 1859 and in 1861, the couple immigrated to New Zealand, sailing to Auckland with their one year old daughter, Mary.

Elizabeth and George opened their own photographic studio in Auckland in 1867. George died in 1871 and Elizabeth continued the business on her own, while raising their children. From the 1870s to the 1890s, her business was known under the names E. Pulman's Photographic Room, Pulman's Photographic Room and Pulman's Photographic Gallery.

Pulman's studio specialised in scenic photographs and portraits. Many of her portrait photographs picture Māori figures, sometimes posed seated like royalty. Her photographic subjects include important Māori tribal figures such as Chief Paul Paora Tuhaere, King Tawhiao, and Tawhiao's daughter and second wife. Although Pulman probably paid people to model for some of her photographs, many of her portraits, especially those of important public figures, were commissioned.

King Tawhiao was a significant figure in Pulman’s practice, visiting her studio in January 1882. He eagerly embraced portrait photography, appreciating its potential use for publicity, political influence and the shaping of his public perception. Shortly after Pulman photographed Tawhiao, she discovered that Charles Monkton was selling copies of the image and took him to court. The case was ultimately dismissed as the judge ruled copyright had not been breached.

New Zealand artist Gottfried Lindauer used Pulman's photographs as a basis for some of his paintings. For example, his 1879 portrait Anehana is based on a photograph taken in Pulman's studio sometime between 1867 and 1871. Pulman’s July 1879 photo of Rewi Manga Maniapoto was also used as a reference by Lindauer, evidenced by his 1882 painting Rewi Manga Maniapoto.

Pulman died from a stroke on 3 February 1900 in Auckland, New Zealand.
