= Oughtrington Hall =

Country house in Cheshire, England

Coordinates: 53.37867°N 2.45951°W

Oughtrington Hall was a country house east of the village of Lymm in Cheshire, England.

The manor house was rebuilt in about 1810 for Trafford Trafford (né Leigh: a descendant of the ancient Leighs of West Hall, High Legh), who assumed the surname and arms of Trafford by Royal Licence 5 December 1791 in compliance with the Will of his maternal uncle Richard Trafford, of Swythamley. (Note: According to his biographer, John Champness, the house was almost certainly designed by Thomas Harrison.)

In 1862 Oughtrington Hall was bought by G. C. Dewhurst, a cotton manufacturer from Manchester. Dewhurst enlarged the service wing and also paid for the construction of St Peter's Church nearby.

Built in the neoclassical architectural style, it is rendered of brick with stone dressings and a slate roof. At the centre of the entrance front is a wide canted bay containing a porch with paired Tuscan columns. On each side of the porch are three-light windows under a segmental arch.

The former mansion now forms the main building of Lymm High School, and is designated in the National Heritage List for England as a Grade II listed building.

== See also ==
- Listed buildings in Lymm
- List of works by Thomas Harrison
