= Lymm railway station =

Former railway station in England

Coordinates: 53.3843°N 2.4843°W

Lymm
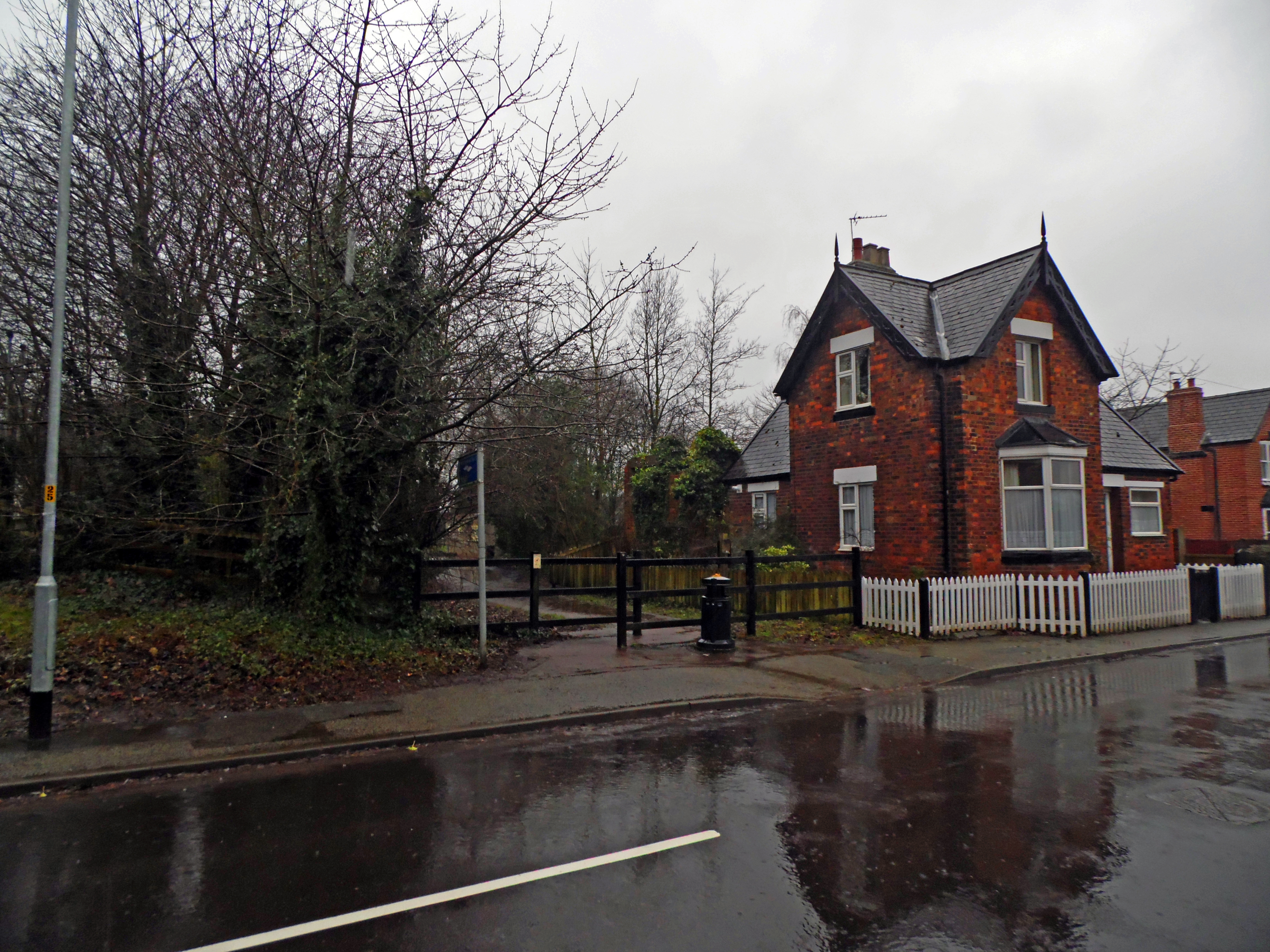
- Lymm Railway Station in January 2018

General information
- Location: Lymm, Warrington; England
- Grid reference: SJ678875
- Platforms: 2

Other information
- Status: Disused

History
- Original company: Warrington and Stockport Railway
- Pre-grouping: London and North Western Railway
- Post-grouping: London, Midland and Scottish Railway; London Midland Region (British Railways)

Key dates
- 1 November 1853: Opened
- 10 September 1962: Closed
Location

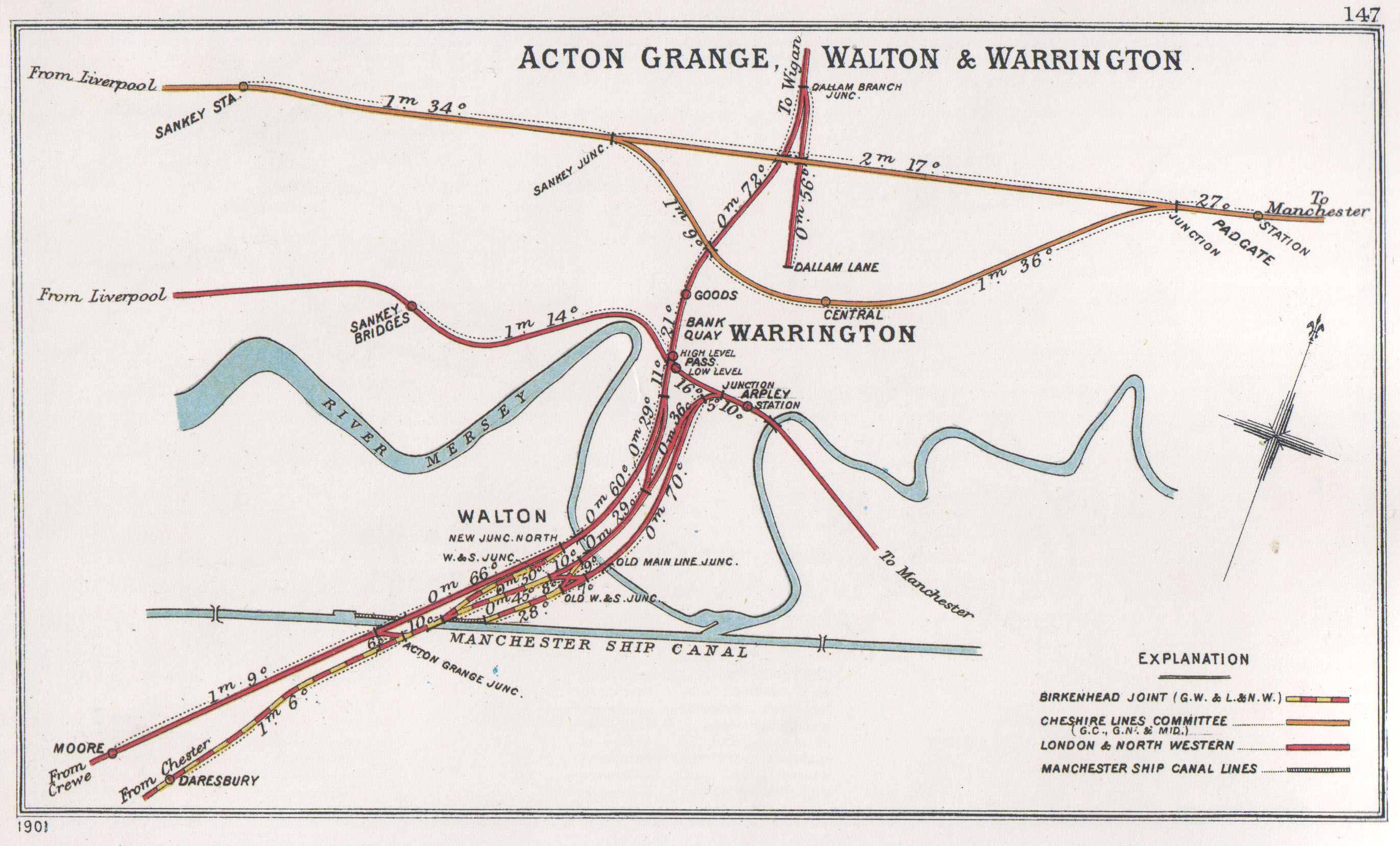
Map showing Warrington Arpley

Lymm railway station was a station to the west of Whitbarrow Road, Lymm, England on the Warrington and Stockport Railway. It opened in 1853; and it closed in 1962. The railway was absorbed by the LNWR. The station was on the southernmost railway line between Liverpool to Manchester.

Preceding station	Disused railways	Following station
Thelwall	London and North Western Railway; Warrington & Stockport Railway	Heatley & Warburton
