= John Johnson (baptist) =

John Johnson (1706–1791) was an English Baptist minister, the founder of a sect that became known as Johnsonian Baptists.

== Life ==
The son of an agricultural worker, he was born at Lostock Gralam, in the parish of Eccles, near Manchester, in March 1706. He was piously brought up, and when twenty years old became a preacher. About 1741 he was appointed pastor of the Byrom Street Baptist Chapel, Liverpool. He left around 1747–48, after his doctrinal views had made him unacceptable to a section of the congregation.

Johnson and his adherents then built a chapel in Stanley Street, Liverpool, opened in 1750, in charge of which he remained until his death on 20 March 1791, aged 85. His wife, whom he married about 1740, survived him. His followers were found for a long time at Wisbech in Cambridgeshire, and elsewhere.

== Works ==
Among Johnson's writings were:

- The Advantages and Disadvantages of the Married State, 5th edit. 1760; often reprinted.
- A Mathematical Question propounded by the Vicegerent of the World, 1755; 5th edit. Windsor, U.S.A., 1794; another printed in London, 1859.
- The Election of God Undisguised, 1759.
- The Faith of God's Elect, 1754
- The Two Opinions Tried, 1764.
- Divine Truth, being a Vindication of the Attributes, &c., of God, 1769.
- The Riches of Gospel Grace Opened, 2 vols. Warrington, 1776.
- A Scriptural Illustration of the Book of Revelation, Warrington, 1779.
- The Evangelical Believer's Confession of the Son of God, Liverpool, 1781.
- The Divine Authority of the Holy Scriptures.
- Original Letters, 2 vols. Norwich 1796–1800. This contains an account of the author, perhaps by Samuel Fisher, who preached his funeral sermon.
