= Zico Chain =

Rock band

- Origin: London, England
- Genres: Post-grunge; Alternative metal Hard rock
- Years active: 2002–present
- Labels: Hassle Records (2006–2008); Degenerate Music (2009–2012); Suburban Records (2012–present)
- Members: Chris Glithero; Paul Frost; Ollie Middleton; Tommy Gentry
- Website: www.zicochain.net

Zico Chain is a rock band from London, United Kingdom, formed in 2002. To date, they have released two full albums entitled Food and The Devil in Your Heart, a self-titled EP and an EP called These Birds Will Kill Us All. The band opened the main stage at the Download Festival on 8 June 2007. They supported Velvet Revolver on their 2007 summer tour of the UK, in support of their second album Libertad. Their new album The Devil in Your Heart was released on 16 April 2012.

== Early years ==
The band formed in East London. Vocalist-bassist Chris Glithero had moved there from Manchester, and met guitarist Paul Frost and drummer Ollie Middleton. Their dissatisfaction with 21st-century British rock helped them connect with one another. Influenced by such bands as Motörhead, Queens of the Stone Age, The White Stripes and System of a Down, they began recording, and soon were signed to Hassle Records. For their first EP, they worked with Ted Miller, who has previously worked with Placebo. They then toured with Nine Black Alps, Alkaline Trio, Cave In and The Fall of Troy. They had a number-one video on MTV2's chart. Slash and Duff McKagan of Velvet Revolver (and Guns N' Roses) revealed that Zico Chain were their favourite new band. On 9 November 2009, the band released a standalone single "These Birds Will Kill Us All" with B-sides "Blood 'N Bile" and "Daycase", available on iTunes among other internet sites.

== The Zico Chain EP (2006) ==
The Zico Chain's first official EP was released in April 2006, and contained six tracks; "Rohypnol", "This Thing", "Roll Over", "Social Suicide", "Brain", and "The Lonely Ones". "Rohypnol" was released as a single from the album, along with a video. Produced by The Zico Chain. Engineered by Marc Lane/Tom Harris. Recorded at The Dairy Studios.

== Food (2007–2008) ==
Zico Chain's second album, Food, was released 15 October 2007. The album contains eleven tracks: "Pretty Pictures", "Where Would You Rather Be?", "Food", "Junk", "Roll Over", "Preach", "No Hoper Boy", "Your Favourite Client", "Nihilism", "All Eyes on Me" and "Anaemia". The album also included one iTunes bonus track "1,2,3,4". "Junk", "Where Would You Rather Be?" and "Anaemia" were released as singles from the album over the course of 2007. The album received mainly good critical reception ratings ranging from 3 to 5 stars.

== These Birds Will Kill Us All EP (2010) ==
Zico Chain's These Birds Will Kill Us All EP was released in 2010. The band released one single off the album, which shares the same name as the album. Songs such as "Bile n' Blood" and "Daycase" started to appear on the band's Myspace page.

== The Devil in Your Heart (2012) ==
The band's second full studio album, The Devil in Your Heart, was released on 16 April 2012. Pre-release reviews of the album were positive. The album came after a two-year break from recording. The band also completed a UK tour to promote the album's launch and they also played as support act on the European British Lion tour of Iron Maiden's Steve Harris.

== Band members ==
- Chris Glithero – vocals, bass
- Paul Frost (indefinite hiatus) – guitar, vocals
- Ollie Middleton – drums
- Tommy Gentry – guitar, vocals

== Music videos ==
Year	Song name	Record label	Album/EP
2006	"Rohypnol"	Hassle Records	Zico Chain EP
2007	"Where Would You Rather Be?"	Hassle Records	Food
2007	"Anaemia"	Hassle Records	Food
2007	"Junk"	Hassle Records	Food
2009	"These Birds Will Kill Us All"	Degenerate Music	These Birds Will Kill Us All EP
2012	New Romantic	Suburban Records	The Devil in Your Heart

== Discography ==
Albums

- 2006 – The Zico Chain
- 2007 – Food
- 2012 – The Devil in Your Heart

EPs

- 2004 – Touch EP
- 2010 – These Birds Will Kill Us All EP
