= Lymm Hall =

Country house in Lymm, Cheshire, England

Coordinates: 53.37925°N 2.47591°W

Lymm Hall is a moated English country house in the village of Lymm near Warrington, Cheshire. It is a Grade II* listed building.

== History ==
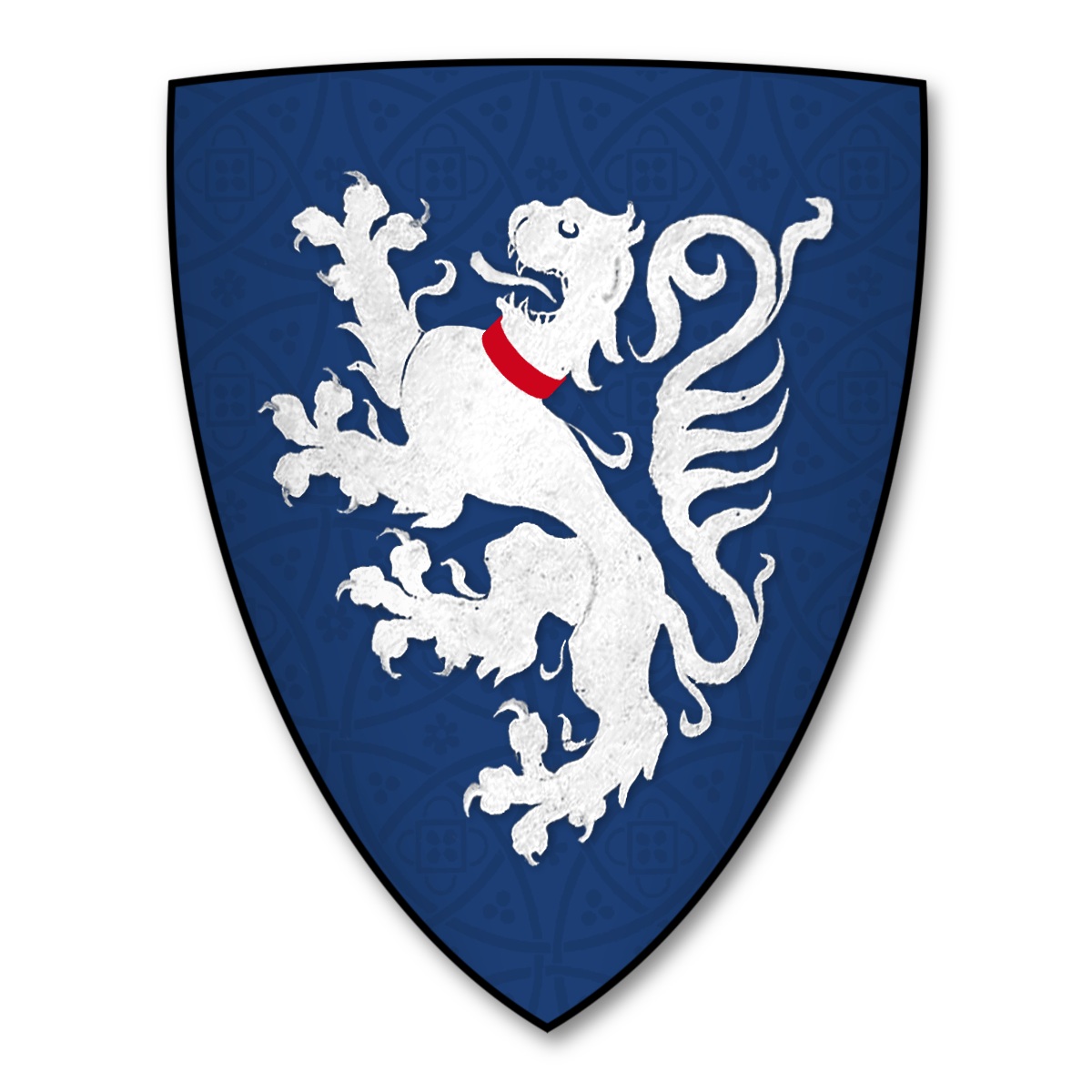
Domville arms

The ancient manor house originally owned by the family de Lymme in medieval times then devolved upon the Leighs, before coming into the possession of the Domville family by marriage in 1342, when Robert Domville married Agnes, elder daughter of Thomas de Leigh (died 1366), of the West Hall, High Legh. The Domvilles and their descendants remained seated at Lymm for the next 500 years.

The present mansion was built in the late 16th century for the Domville family. In the 18th or early 19th century, service wings were added. In about 1840, stepped gables and mullioned windows were installed, resulting in a symmetrical neo-Jacobean style façade. Its rose garden was designed by Edward Kemp in 1849, being his first recorded commission.

In 1697 the Lymm estate was bequeathed by William Domville (1629–1706) to his nephew William Mascie (1655–1706), son of Richard Mascie of Sale, whose daughter and heiress Ann married Henry Taylor, Mayor of Liverpool (for 1720/21). His grandson, Thomas Taylor (died 1814), devolved the estate upon his younger son, the Reverend Mascie Domville Taylor (1783–1845), after whose death Lymm Hall and its estate was sold piecemeal in 1846. The estate comprised 564 acres (228 ha), the Hall, 18 cottages, two public houses, four farms, a corn mill, a slaughter house, and a smith's and wheelwright's shop. The Hall has had several owners since then.

The Hall and Moat House together with the adjacent buildings have been in the ownership of the Cottrill family since the early 1900s. The Hall and stables have now been divided with the hall itself been separated in to two wings and the grounds reduced to 10 acres. The estate is currently listed for sale at £2.25m.

== Architecture ==
The main (north) front and the west front are constructed in coursed buff sandstone; the south front is in brick with stone dressings on a stone plinth. The roofs are slated and the chimneys constructed of stone. The Hall has two storeys and attics. The north front is E-shaped. It has a central porch with a balustrade, and three-light mullioned and transomed windows on each side. Above the porch is a two-light sash window. The parapet is plain, rising in two steps to the projecting wings. These have three-light mullioned windows in the lower level, three-light mullioned and transomed windows in the upper level, and a single-light window in the gable. The west front has sash windows, a projecting chimney, and a canted four-light oriel window. The south front is irregular in plan, with a recessed gabled portion to the left containing one window, a central portion with three windows, and a right gabled portion containing a canted two-storey bay window. To the right of the south front is a wing with a bow window containing a French window. Above this is a Doric cornice. The east front is obscured behind a 19th-century service wing.

== Associated structures ==
Lymm Hall is approached by a bridge over a moat (now dry) that dates probably from the middle of the 17th century. The bridge is listed at Grade II. The former stables, probably dating from the early 17th century, have been converted into a house, and are also listed at Grade II. The moated site on which the Hall stands, together with an ice house, are a scheduled monument. To the west are two cockpits also recognised as a Scheduled Monument. A temporary structure sited to the west of the main Hall, colloquially referred to as 'The Den' existed in the late 20th century before being damaged beyond repair by weather damage. A replacement structure was built on a new site, this time to the east of the Hall, though was destroyed by fire in an apparent deliberate act of arson in the early 21st century. The culprit has never been identified.
