= Lymm Dam =

Coordinates: 53.376°N 2.480°W

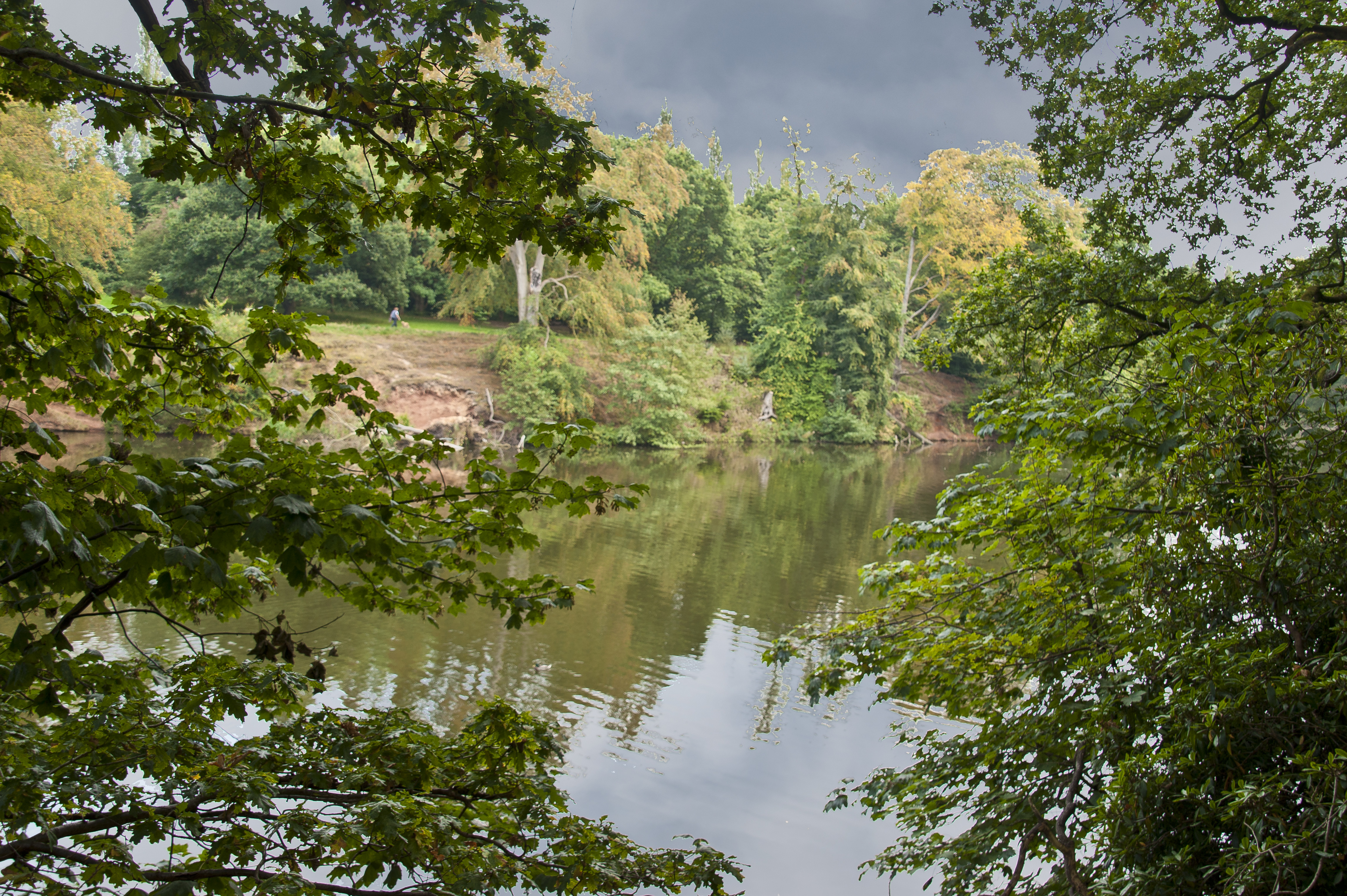

Lymm Dam is the name of a dam and lake in Lymm, Cheshire, England, an inset village in the greenbelt around Warrington. It was created in 1824 by a dam built during the construction of what is now the A56 road, when local inhabitants objected to initial plans for a route through the village centre. It may have been used to supply power to local industry, and the surrounding area.

Warrington Borough Council began managing the Lymm Dam and its park in the early 1980s. At that time there were considerable erosion problems and the Ranger Service began to upgrade the existing path network and take over the park maintenance. It is now a popular visitor attraction, which has won several Green Flag Awards for its improvements to the infrastructure and ecology of the dam.

The lake is fed from the south by three streams, the Bradley Brook, Mag Brook and Kaylane Brook, and its outlet runs under the A56 and down a valley known as the Dingle to the Lower Dam in Lymm village centre. The dam at the foot of the lake is Grade II listed, as is Crosfield Bridge at the head of the lake.

== See also ==
- List of parks and open spaces in Cheshire
