= Warrington and Altrincham Junction Railway =

Overview
- Locale: Northwest England
- Dates of operation: 1853–1985

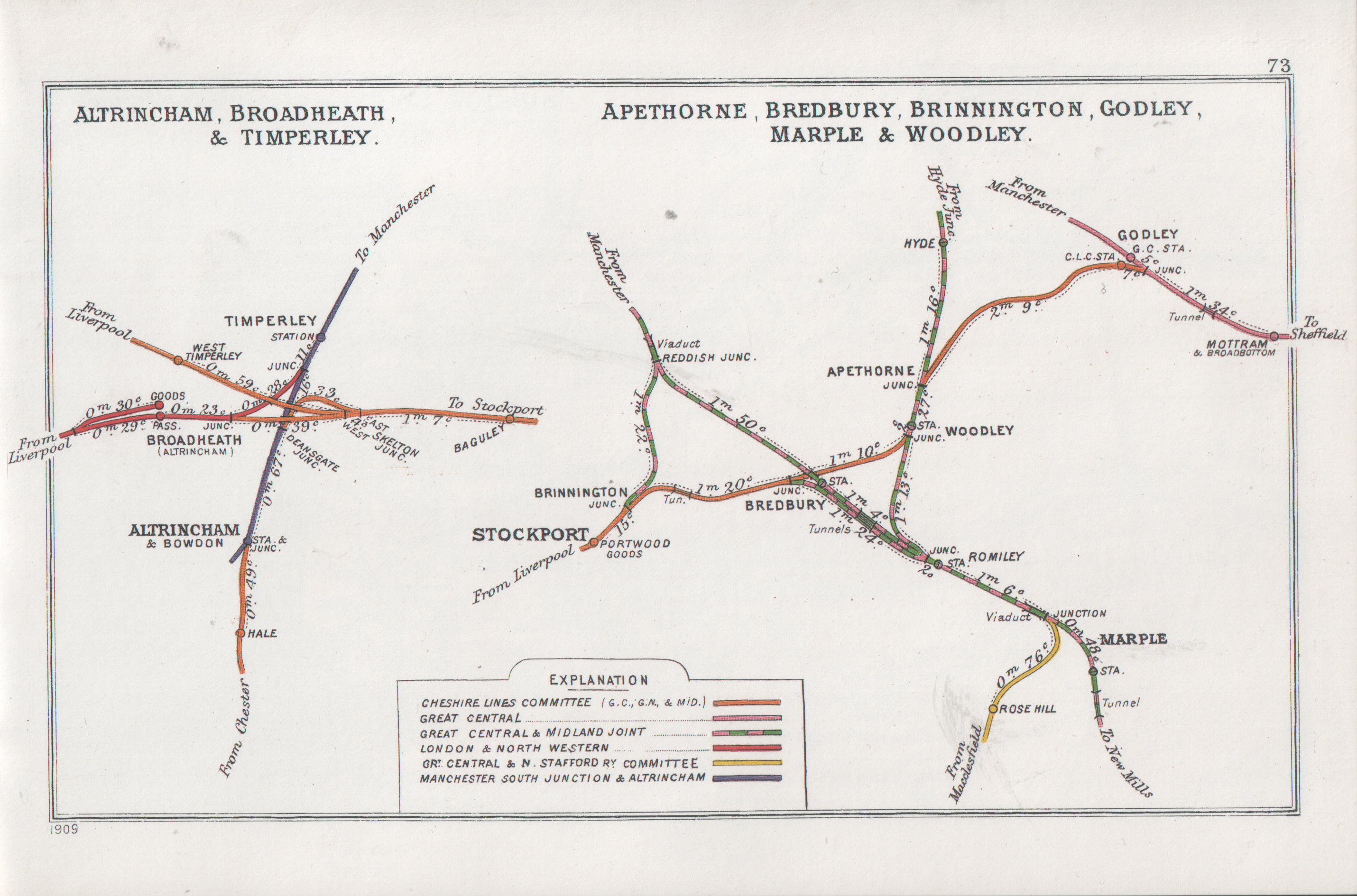
Eastern terminal Junction at Altrincham

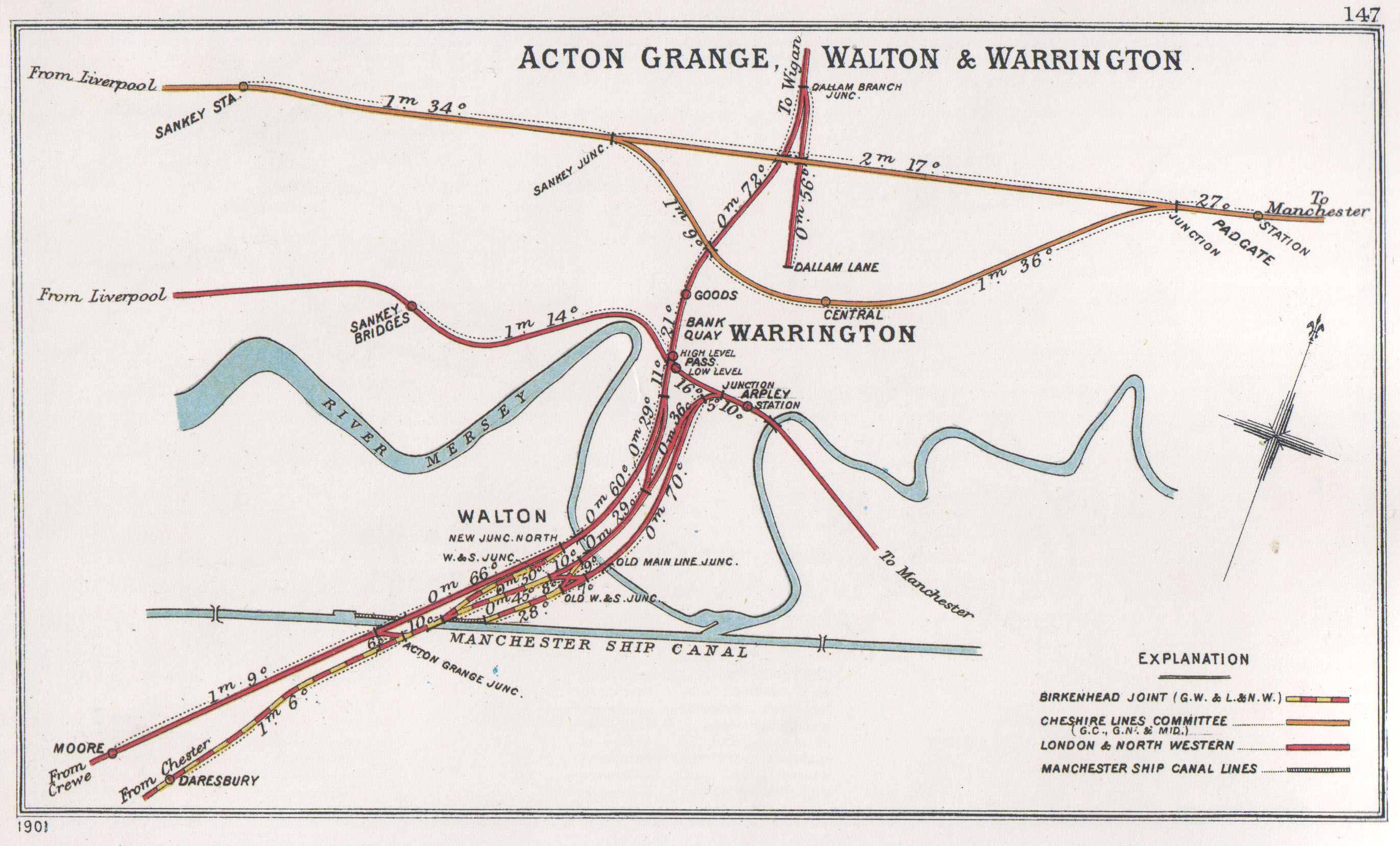
Start at Warrington Arpley

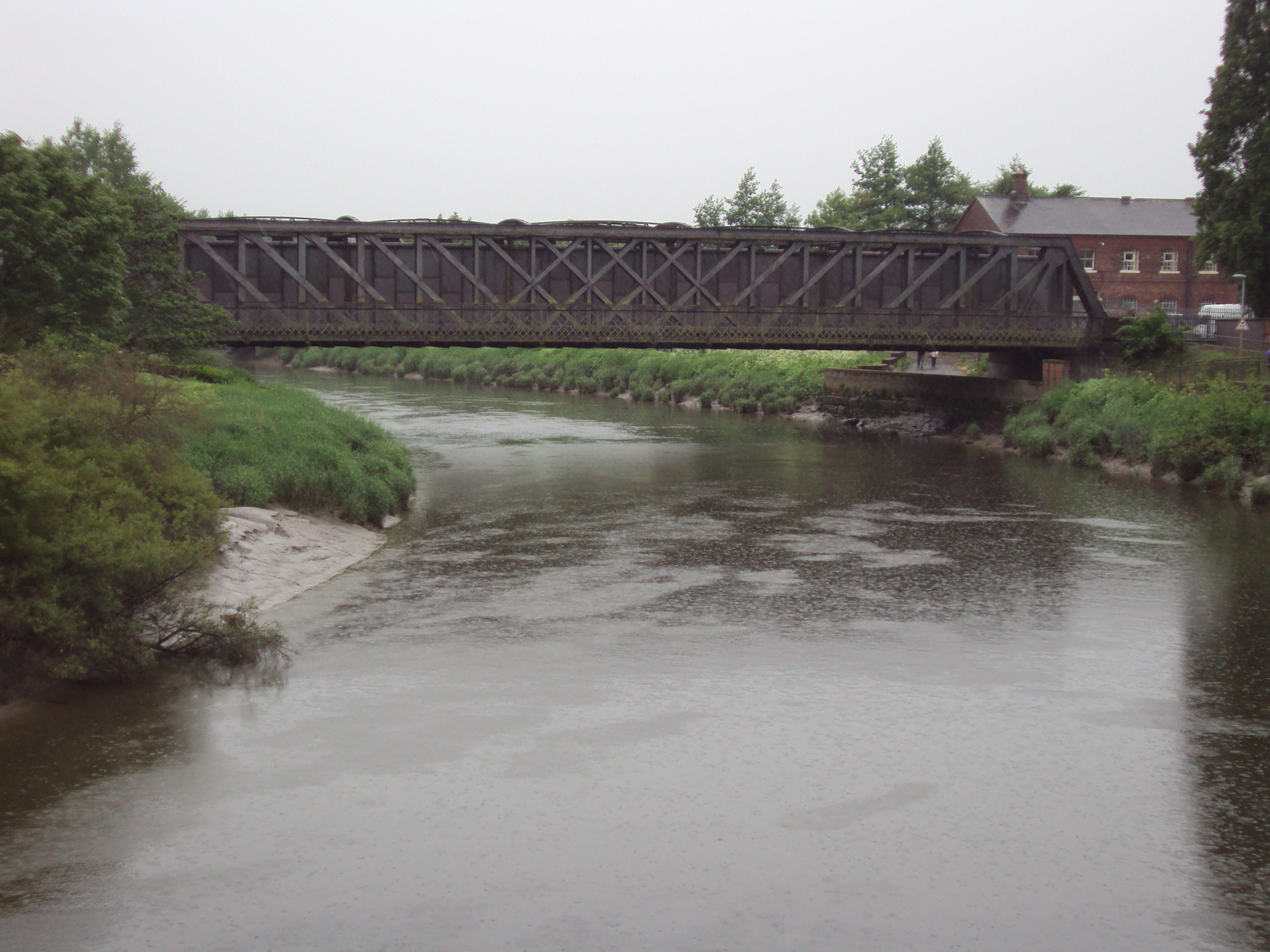
Bridge over the River Mersey

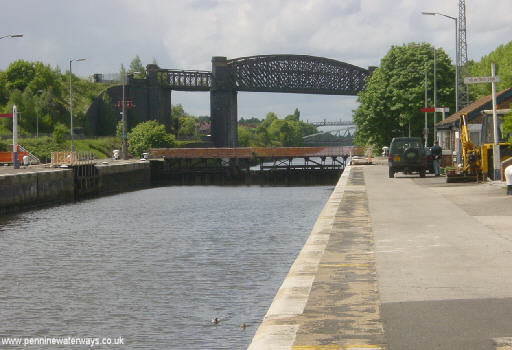
Bridge over the Manchester Ship Canal

Warrington and Altrincham Junction Railway Act 1851
- Act of Parliament
- Parliament of the United Kingdom
- Long title: An Act for making a Railway from Warrington to Altrincham, with a Branch to join the Birkenhead, Lancashire, and Cheshire Junction Railway at Lower Walton, to be called the Warrington and Altrincham Junction Railway; and for other Purposes.
- Citation: 14 & 15 Vict. c. lxxi

Dates
- Royal assent: 3 July 1851

Text of statute as originally enacted

Warrington and Altrincham Junction Railway Act 1853
- Act of Parliament
- Parliament of the United Kingdom
- Long title: An Act to enable the Warrington and Altrincham Junction Railway Company to make Deviations and Branches at Warrington, and to use certain neighbouring Railways.
- Citation: 16 & 17 Vict. c. ccxviii

Dates
- Royal assent: 20 August 1853

Text of statute as originally enacted

The Warrington and Altrincham Junction Railway was a railway line that was in operation from 1 November 1853 to 7 July 1985. The railway was created by an act of Parliament, the Warrington and Altrincham Junction Railway Act 1851 (14 & 15 Vict. c. lxxi), on 3 July 1851 to build a line between Timperley Junction on the Manchester, South Junction and Altrincham Railway (MSJAR), to provide a through route to Manchester, and Warrington Arpley on the St Helens and Runcorn Gap Railway providing a link with Liverpool.

== Renaming ==
Warrington and Stockport Railway Act 1853
- Act of Parliament
- Parliament of the United Kingdom
- Long title: An Act to enable the Warrington and Altrincham Junction Railway Company to extend their Railway to Stockport.
- Citation: 16 & 17 Vict. c. cxxii

Dates
- Royal assent: 4 August 1853

Text of statute as originally enacted

A bill to build an extension, designed by Thomas Brassey, to Stockport, passed on 4 August 1853 as the Warrington and Stockport Railway Act 1853 (16 & 17 Vict. c. cxxii), also renamed the railway company to the Warrington and Stockport Railway.

== Opening ==
Warrington and Stockport Railway Capital Act 1858
- Act of Parliament
- Parliament of the United Kingdom
- Long title: An Act for limiting, defining, and regulating the Capital and Debt of the Warrington and Stockport Railway Company; for amending the Acts relating to the Company, and conferring on them further Powers; and for other Purposes relating to the Company.
- Citation: 21 & 22 Vict. c. cl

Dates
- Royal assent: 2 August 1858

Warrington and Stockport Railway Leasing Act 1859
- Act of Parliament
- Parliament of the United Kingdom
- Long title: An Act to transfer the Warrington and Stockport Railway to certain Companies.
- Citation: 22 & 23 Vict. c. cxxxviii

Dates
- Royal assent: 13 August 1859

The Warrington and Stockport Railway (W&SR) was opened on 1 November 1853 from a temporary station at Wilderspool in Warrington to a station at Altrincham which later became Broadheath. Delays in the delivery of iron work for the bridges over the Mersey and Bridgewater Canal meant that the line was initially isolated from the rest of the railway network. The line was opened throughout from 1 May 1854 although passenger trains terminated at Broadheath until the W&SR and MSJAR could agree on charges for passengers travelling beyond there to Manchester via Timperley.

A link with Stockport was achieved when the Stockport, Timperley and Altrincham Junction Railway (ST&AJ) opened its line on 1 February 1866 from Broadheath Junction on the W&SR to Skelton Junction on the newly opened line from Deansgate Junction to Stockport.

The London and North Western Railway operated the line from opening and on 1 January 1861 bought it. On 9 July 1893 the line was re-routed to allow for the Manchester Ship Canal, which would open in 1894, the canal being crossed by the high level Latchford Viaduct.

== Closure ==
Passenger trains on the line ended on 10 September 1962. The line to the east of Latchford closed completely on 7 July 1985. The line was still busy at this time but extensive (and costly) repairs would have been needed to the Latchford Viaduct for continued operation – these were deemed not to be economically justifiable given that the remaining freight traffic could be diverted via alternative routes and there was no desire to extend the Manchester tram system to Warrington.

== Current status and future plans ==
The trackbed between Latchford and Broadheath now forms part of the Trans Pennine Trail. Current plans for HS2 show it may cross the line between Heatley and Carr Green.

In March 2015 a planning application was submitted to build up to 280 homes on the former route in Latchford. This would involve levelling the railway embankment to the west of Latchford viaduct. However as of 2020, nothing has been approved nor planned to continue due to the line being protected by the council.

In August 2019, the town council announced they were looking to build a mass transit network that would involve crossing the canal and have identified but yet to confirm it will go ahead. The line at Latchford. They also have announced in their proposal that any disused rail corridor in the borough is protected from development so it may be used again for either rail or different transport.

In March 2020, a bid was made to the Restoring Your Railway fund to get funds for a feasibility study into reinstating the line between Warrington and Stockport. This bid was unsuccessful.

In November 2021 the UK Government announced its Integrated Rail Plan for the North and Midlands, part of which proposes the reuse of part of the line to connect Liverpool to HS2 via Warrington and involves reinstating the low-level platforms at Warrington Bank Quay station

== Stations ==
- Warrington Arpley railway station
- Latchford railway station
- Thelwall railway station
- Lymm railway station
- Heatley & Warburton railway station
- Dunham Massey railway station
- Broadheath railway station
