= Latchford railway station =

Former railway station in England

Coordinates: 53.3785°N 2.5663°W

Latchford

General information
- Location: Latchford, Warrington; England
- Grid reference: SJ624869
- Platforms: 2

Other information
- Status: Disused

History
- Original company: Warrington and Stockport Railway
- Pre-grouping: London and North Western Railway
- Post-grouping: London, Midland and Scottish Railway; London Midland Region (British Railways)

Key dates
- 1 November 1853: First station opened as Latchford and Grappenhall Road
- June 1854: Renamed Latchford
- 9 July 1893: New station opened on different alignment
- 10 September 1962: Closed to passengers
- 1 July 1965: Closed completely
Location

Latchford railway station was a station in Latchford, Cheshire, England. The first station at Latchford was called Latchford and Grappenhall Road and opened in 1853; this was renamed Latchford in June 1854 but it closed in 1893, when a new alignment was opened in connection with the construction of the Manchester Ship Canal, and a new Latchford station was opened nearby. This closed to passengers on 10 September 1962. The station was on the LNWR's Ditton Junction to Skelton Junction line and was used by Ditton Junction–Manchester and Liverpool–Manchester through trains.

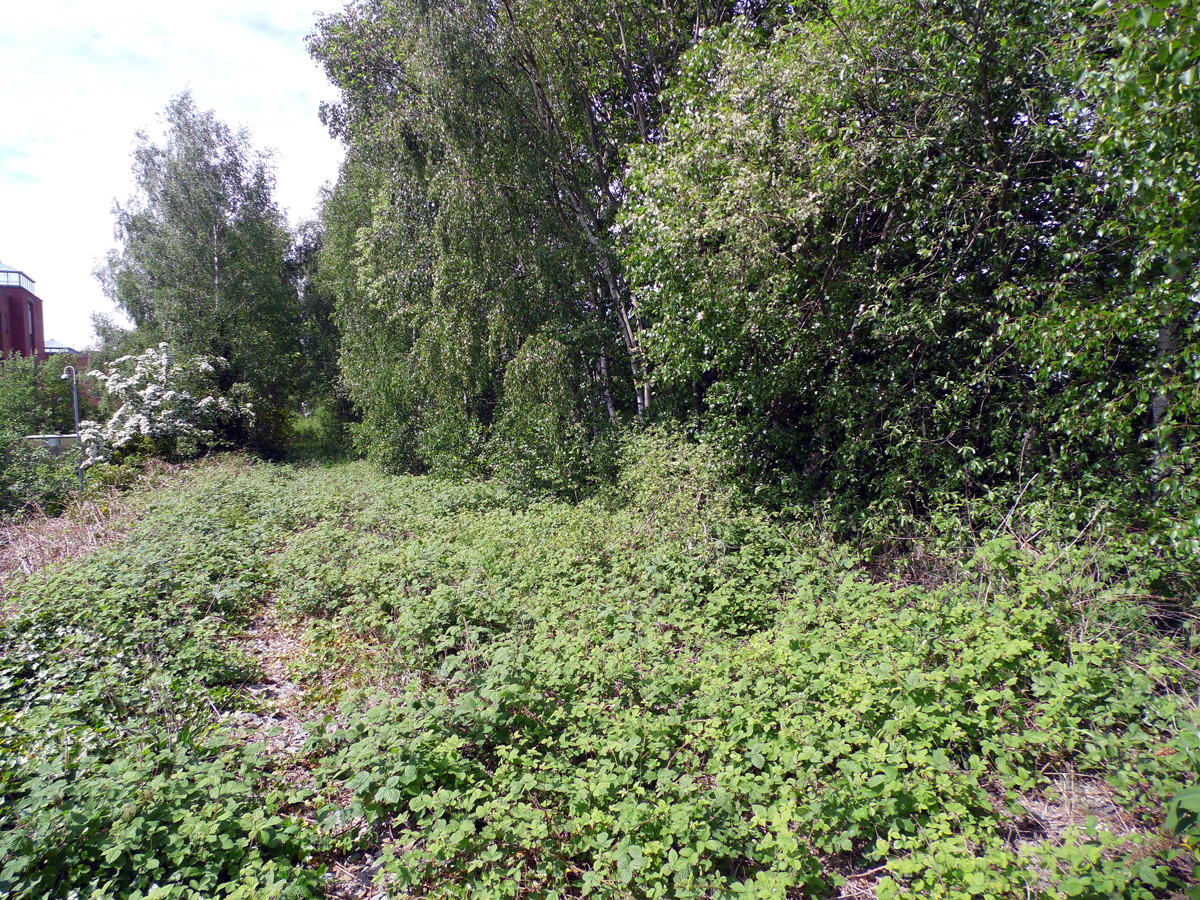
Latchford Railway Station May 2018

| Preceding station | Disused railways | Following station |
|---|---|---|
| Warington Arpley | London and North Western Railway; Warrington & Stockport Railway | Thelwall |
