= Warrington Arpley railway station =

Closed railway station in England

Coordinates: 53.3853°N 2.5942°W

Warrington Arpley

General information
- Location: Warrington, Warrington; England
- Grid reference: SJ605877
- Platforms: 2

Other information
- Status: Disused

History
- Original company: Warrington and Stockport Railway
- Pre-grouping: London and North Western Railway
- Post-grouping: London, Midland and Scottish Railway; London Midland Region (British Railways)

Key dates
- 1 May 1854: Station opened
- 16 November 1868: Closed
- 2 October 1871: Reopened
- 15 September 1958: Closed to passengers
- 9 August 1965: Closed completely
Location

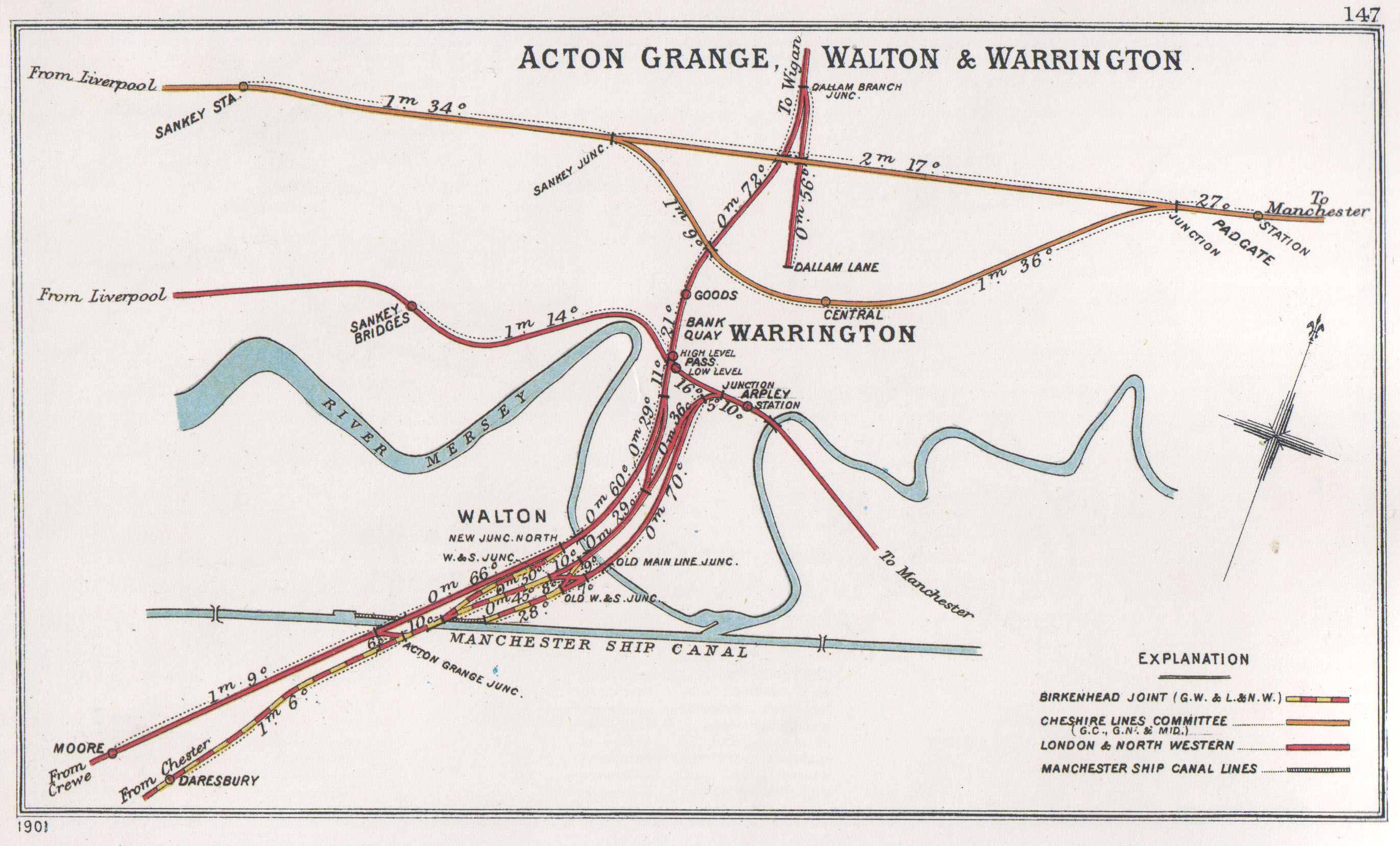
Map showing Warrington Arpley

Warrington Arpley railway station was a station located on the south side of Wilson Patten Street, Warrington, England at the junction of St Helens Railway and Warrington and Stockport Railway. It opened on 1 May 1854 replacing Warrington Wilderspool. Both railways were absorbed by the LNWR. It closed to passengers on 15 September 1958. The station was on the southmost Liverpool to Manchester line.

Preceding station	Disused railways	Following station
Warrington Bank Quay Low Level	London and North Western Railway; St Helens Railway	Terminus
Terminus	London and North Western Railway; Warrington & Stockport Railway	Latchford
