= The Kooks discography =

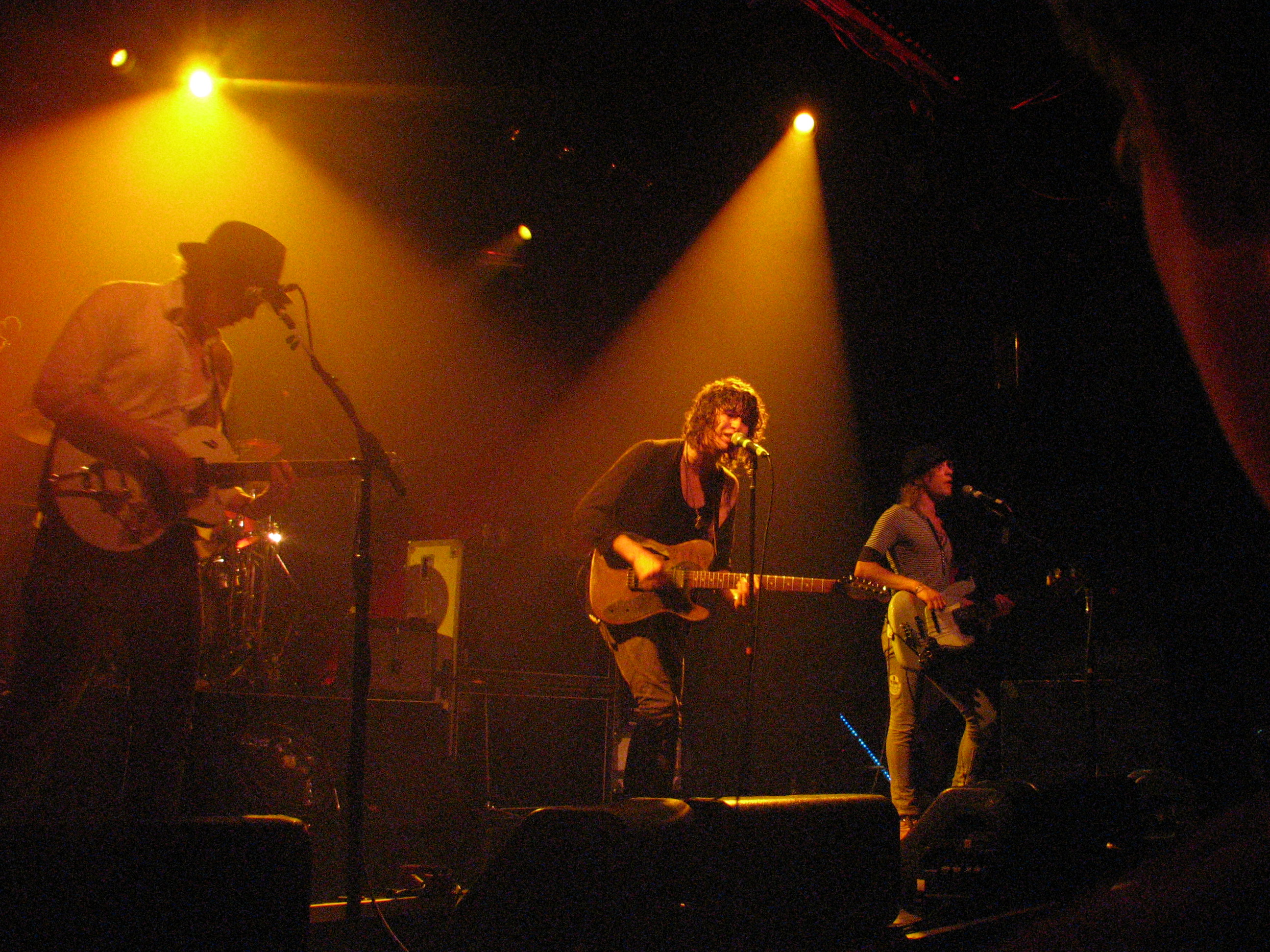
- The Kooks at Irving Plaza, May 2007
- Studio albums: 7
- Extended plays: 8
- Compilation albums: 1
- Singles: 30
- Music videos: 25
- Remix albums: 1

The discography of the Kooks, a British indie rock band, contains 6 studio albums, 8 extended plays, 30 singles and 25 music videos.

== Albums ==
=== Studio albums ===
List of albums, with selected chart positions and certifications
Title	Album details	Peak chart positions										Certifications
Title	Album details	UK	AUS	FRA	GER	IRE	JPN	NLD	SCO	SWI	US	Certifications
Inside In / Inside Out	Released: 23 January 2006; Label: Virgin (#CDV3016A); Formats: CD, 2×LP, MC, digital download	2	84	107	66	3	74	25	1	83	165	BPI: 5× Platinum; ARIA: Platinum; BVMI: Gold; IRMA: 2× Platinum; RMNZ: 2× Platinum
Konk	Released: 11 April 2008; Label: Virgin (#CDV3043); Formats: CD, 2×CD, LP, MC, digital download	1	8	20	6	2	35	7	1	9	41	BPI: Platinum; ARIA: Gold; IRMA: Gold
Junk of the Heart	Released: 12 September 2011; Label: Virgin (#CDV3090); Formats: CD, 2×CD, LP, digital download	10	9	19	6	41	85	6	13	8	68	
Listen	Released: 8 September 2014; Label: Virgin (#CDV3129); Formats: CD, LP, digital download	16	15	79	19	51	91	51	22	16	85	BPI: Silver
Let's Go Sunshine	Released: 31 August 2018; Label: Lonely Cat (#KOOKS001CD); Formats: CD, 2×LP, MC, digital download	9	43	— (Note: Let's Go Sunshine did not enter the France Albums Chart but peaked at number 193 on the French Physical Albums Chart.)	41	50	193	56	9	38	— (Note: Let's Go Sunshine did not enter the US Billboard 200, but peaked at number 73 on the Top Current Album Sales Chart.)	
10 Tracks to Echo in the Dark	Released: 22 July 2022; Label: Lonely Cat; Formats: CD, LP, MC, digital download	32	—	—	22	—	—	—	7	62	—	
Never/Know	Released: 9 May 2025; Label: Lonely Cat; Formats: CD, LP, digital download	5	—	—	—	—	—	—	2	—	—	
"—" denotes album that did not chart or was not released in that territory.

=== Compilation albums ===
Title	Album details	Peak chart positions				Certifications
Title	Album details	UK	BEL (FL)	BEL (WA)	SCO	Certifications
The Best of... So Far	Released: 19 May 2017; Label: Virgin (#CDV3181); Formats: CD, 2×CD, 2×LP, digital download	18	47	167	15	BPI: Gold

=== Remix albums ===
Title	Album details	Peak chart positions
Title	Album details	UK Dance
Hello, What's Your Name?	Released: 4 December 2015; Label: Caroline International / Virgin / Lonely Cat (#LCCDX1); Formats: CD, 2×LP, digital download	17

== Extended plays ==
Title	EP details	Peak chart positions
Title	EP details	UK
HMV Live	Released: 3 February 2006; Label: Virgin; Format: digital download	—
Live at the Astoria	Released: 7 August 2006; Label: Virgin; Format: digital download	—
iTunes Live: London Festival '08	Released: 25 September 2008; Label: Virgin; Format: digital download	187
Another Side to Konk	Released: 21 October 2008; Label: Virgin; Format: CD	—
Unshelved: Pt. I	Released: 10 April 2020; Label: Virgin; Format: digital download	—
Unshelved: Pt. II	Released: 8 May 2020; Label: Virgin; Format: digital download	—
Unshelved: Pt. III	Released: 3 July 2020; Label: Virgin; Format: digital download	—
Connection – Echo in the Dark, Pt. 1	Released: 27 January 2022; Label: Lonely Cat; Format: digital download	—
"—" denotes album that did not chart.

== Singles ==
List of singles, with chart positions, showing year released and album name
Single	Year	Peak chart positions										Certifications	Album
Single	Year	UK	AUS	BEL (FL)	GER	IRE	ITA	NLD	NZ	SWI	US Alt	Certifications	Album
"Eddie's Gun"	2005	35	—	—	—	—	—	—	—	—	—		Inside In/Inside Out
"Sofa Song"	2005	28	—	—	—	—	—	—	—	—	—	BPI: Silver	Inside In/Inside Out
"You Don't Love Me"	2006	12	—	—	—	—	—	—	—	—	—		Inside In/Inside Out
"Naïve"	2006	5	94	15	—	—	31	82	15	— (Note: "Naïve" did not enter the Swiss Singles chart, but charted at number 86 on the Swiss Airplay chart.)	22	BPI: 6× Platinum; BVMI: Gold; FIMI: Gold; RMNZ: 6× Platinum	Inside In/Inside Out
"She Moves in Her Own Way"	2006	7	—	29	66	11	—	55	11	— (Note: "She Moves in Her Own Way" did not enter the Swiss Singles chart, but charted at number 59 on the Swiss Airplay chart.)	39	BPI: 5× Platinum; RMNZ: 2× Platinum	Inside In/Inside Out
"Ooh La"	2006	20	—	— (Note: "Ooh La" did not enter the Flanders Ultratop 50, but peaked at number two on the Ultratip chart.)	—	38	—	—	—	—	—	BPI: Gold	Inside In/Inside Out
"Always Where I Need to Be"	2008	3	84	19	55	15	41	43	40	53	22	BPI: Gold	Konk
"Shine On"	2008	25	—	—	—	32	—	—	—	86	—		Konk
"Do You Wanna"	2008	—	—	— (Note: "Do You Wanna" did not enter the Flanders Ultratop 50, but peaked at number four on the Ultratip chart.)	—	—	—	—	—	—	—		Konk
"Sway"	2008	41	—	— (Note: "Sway" did not enter the Flanders Ultratop 50, but peaked at number 12 on the Ultratip chart.)	—	—	—	—	—	—	—		Konk
"Is It Me"	2011	160	—	— (Note: "Is It Me" did not enter the Flanders Ultratop 50, but peaked at number 23 on the Ultratip chart.)	—	—	—	—	—	— (Note: "Is It Me" did not enter the Swiss Singles chart, but charted at number 80 on the Swiss Airplay chart.)	—		Junk of the Heart
"Junk of the Heart (Happy)"	2011	—	— (Note: "Junk of the Heart (Happy)" did not enter the Australian Singles Chart but peaked at number 10 on the Australia Hitseekers Chart.)	— (Note: "Junk of the Heart (Happy)" did not enter the Flanders Ultratop 50, but peaked at number seven on the Ultratip chart.)	93	—	52	—	—	— (Note: "Junk of the Heart (Happy)" did not enter the Swiss Singles chart, but charted at number 58 on the Swiss Airplay chart.)	20	BPI: Silver	Junk of the Heart
"How'd You Like That"	2012	—	—	—	—	—	—	— (Note: "How'd You Like That" did not enter the Netherlands Single Top 100 but peaked on the Dutch Tipparade Chart at number two.)	—	—	40		Junk of the Heart
"Rosie"	2012	—	—	—	—	—	—	—	—	—	—		Junk of the Heart
"Down"	2014	40	90	— (Note: "Down" did not enter the Flanders Ultratop 50, but peaked at number 19 on the Ultratip chart.)	—	—	—	—	—	—	—		Listen
"Around Town"	2014	35	—	— (Note: "Around Town" did not enter the Flanders Ultratop 50, but peaked at number 15 on the Ultratip chart.)	—	—	—	—	—	—	—		Listen
"Bad Habit"	2014	—	—	— (Note: "Bad Habit" did not enter the Flanders Ultratop 50, but peaked at number 20 on the Ultratip chart.)	—	—	—	—	—	—	24	BPI: Silver	Listen
"Forgive & Forget"	2014	—	— (Note: "Forgive & Forget" did not enter the Australian ARIA Singles Chart but peaked at number 19 on the ARIA Hitseekers Chart.)	— (Note: "Forgive & Forget" did not enter the Flanders Ultratop 50, but peaked at number 44 on the Ultratip chart.)	—	—	—	—	—	—	—		Listen
"See Me Now"	2014	—	—	— (Note: "See Me Now" did not enter the Flanders Ultratop 50, but peaked at number 53 on the Ultratip chart.)	—	—	—	—	—	—	—		Listen
"Creatures of Habit"	2015	—	—	—	—	—	—	—	—	—	—		Non-album single
"Be Who You Are"	2017	—	—	— (Note: "Be Who You Are" did not enter the Flanders Ultratop 50, but peaked at number 35 on the Ultratip chart.)	—	—	—	—	—	—	—		The Best of... So Far
"Broken Vow"	2017	—	—	—	—	—	—	—	—	—	—		The Best of... So Far
"All the Time"	2018	—	—	— (Note: "All the Time" did not enter the Flanders Ultratop 50, but peaked at number 26 on the Ultratip chart.)	—	—	—	—	—	—	—		Let’s Go Sunshine
"No Pressure"	2018	—	—	—	—	—	—	—	—	—	—		Let’s Go Sunshine
"Fractured and Dazed"	2018	—	—	—	—	—	—	—	—	—	—		Let’s Go Sunshine
"Four Leaf Clover"	2018	—	—	— (Note: "Four Leaf Clover" did not enter the Flanders Ultratop 50, but peaked at number 30 on the Ultratip chart.)	—	—	—	—	—	—	—		Let’s Go Sunshine
"Chicken Bone"	2018	—	—	— (Note: "Chicken Bone" did not enter the Flanders Ultratop 50, but peaked at number 30 on the Ultratip chart.)	—	—	—	—	—	—	—		Let’s Go Sunshine
"Got Your Number"	2019	—	—	—	—	—	—	—	—	—	—		Non-album singles
"Hey Love" (with filous)	2020	—	—	—	—	—	—	—	—	—	—		Non-album singles
"Connection"	2022	—	—	—	—	—	—	—	—	— (Note: "Connection" did not enter the Swiss Singles chart, but charted at number 76 on the Swiss Airplay chart.)	—		10 Tracks to Echo in the Dark
"Beautiful World"	2022	—	—	—	—	—	—	—	—	—	—		10 Tracks to Echo in the Dark
"Cold Heart"	2022	—	—	—	—	—	—	—	—	—	—		10 Tracks to Echo in the Dark
"Never Know"	2025	—	—	—	—	—	—	—	— (Note: "Never Know" did not enter the NZ Top 40 Singles Chart, but peaked at number 34 on the NZ Hot 40 Singles Chart.)	—	—		Never/Know
"Sunny Baby"	2025	—	—	—	—	—	—	—	—	—	—		Never/Know
"If They Could Only Know"	2025	—	—	—	—	—	—	—	—	—	—		Never/Know
"—" denotes a recording that did not chart or was not released in that territory.

== Other charting and certified songs ==
List of other charting and certified songs, showing year released and album name
Song	Year	Peak chart positions	Certifications	Album
Song	Year	POL	Certifications	Album
"Seaside"	2006	—	BPI: Platinum; RMNZ: Gold	Inside In/Inside Out
"Victoria"	2009	48		War Child Presents Heroes
"—" denotes a recording that did not chart or was not released in that territory.

== Other appearances ==
Year	Song contributed	Release title
2006	"The King and I"	Colours Are Brighter
2006	"Crazy" (Gnarls Barkley cover)	Radio 1's Live Lounge
2007	"All That She Wants" (Ace of Base cover)	Radio 1 Established 1967
2008	"Young Folks (Peter, Bjorn and John cover)	NME Awards 2008
2009	"Victoria" (The Kinks cover)	War Child Presents Heroes
2009	"Stormy Weather (Frank Sinatra cover)	His Way, Our Way
2009	"Kids" (MGMT cover, acoustic)	Like a Version Five
2011	"Pumped Up Kicks (Foster the People cover)	Radio 1's Live Lounge
2014	"Here for You (Gorgon City cover)	Radio 1's Live Lounge
2017	"She's Electric" (Oasis cover)	Radio 2's Live Lounge
2018	"Feel It Still" (Portugal The Man cover)	Like a Version, Triple J Australia
