= The Best of... So Far =

Greatest hits album by The Kooks
- Released: 19 May 2017
- Genres: Indie rock, indie pop, chamber pop, alternative
- Label: Virgin EMI

The Kooks chronology
Hello, What's Your Name? (2015)	The Best of... So Far (2017)	Let’s Go Sunshine (2018)

The Best of... So Far is a greatest hits album by British rock band The Kooks, released on 19 May 2017 by Virgin and Astralwerks. The compilation includes singles from the band's four studio albums to date, non-singles "Seaside" and "Matchbox" from debut album Inside In/Inside Out, and two new tracks, "Be Who You Are" and "Broken Vow". The deluxe edition of the album includes a 20-track second disc containing demos and alternate versions.

== Background ==
On 21 November 2016, The Kooks announced a 'Best Of' UK Tour to take place in April and May 2017 to mark their tenth anniversary as a band, in which they were planning to perform hits, b-sides and brand new music. To coincide with the tour, on 31 March 2017 the band announced the upcoming release of The Best of... So Far, as well as releasing "Be Who You Are", one of two new songs included on the compilation.

Lead singer and songwriter Luke Pritchard cited initial hesitation in releasing a greatest hits compilation. He stated, "I wasn't particularly sure about the idea of doing a 'best of' album to begin with, because we're not even old - we haven't even been around for twenty years, but it's been cool to see the nostalgia out there from people who grew up with our music." Regarding the compilation's song selection, Pritchard added, "We chose the songs that we thought defined us the most over the years and put them on there."

The two new songs included in the compilation were recorded during sessions with producer Brandon Friesen for the band's upcoming fifth album, Let's Go Sunshine. According to Pritchard, "Be Who You Are" was an attempt to recreate the band's old sound. He said, "I was like, 'What would I have written then, and what kind of style should it be?' The lyrics are all self-reflective and about me at that time. I thought it would be good to go with all the other songs, so it's a nice reflective moment."

Meanwhile, "Broken Vow" is a tale that was inspired by the "hypocrisy" of the Catholic Church, of which Pritchard had some first-hand experience having gone to an all-boys Catholic school in his youth.

Pritchard was also keen to emphasize that this compilation did not signal the end of the band. "It's been the greatest pleasure to work, travel, fight, hate and love the best and most talented people I've met in my life. It's the greatest job in the world and we don't intend to stop any time soon."

== Track listing ==
No.	Title	Writer(s)	Producer(s)	Length
1.	"Naïve"	Luke Pritchard; Hugh Harris; Max Rafferty; Paul Garred	Tony Hoffer	3:25
2.	"Always Where I Need to Be"	Pritchard	Hoffer	2:41
3.	"Junk of the Heart (Happy)"	Pritchard; Hoffer	Hoffer	3:07
4.	"Bad Habit"	Pritchard; Dean Wynton Josiah Cover; Peter Denton	Inflo	3:41
5.	"She Moves in Her Own Way"	Pritchard; Harris; Rafferty; Garred	Hoffer	2:49
6.	"Shine On"	Pritchard	Hoffer	3:15
7.	"Seaside"	Pritchard; Harris; Rafferty; Garred	Hoffer	1:39
8.	"Down"	Pritchard; Cover	Inflo	2:43
9.	"Sofa Song"	Pritchard; Harris; Rafferty; Garred	Hoffer	2:14
10.	"Is It Me"	Pritchard	Hoffer	3:29
11.	"You Don't Love Me"	Pritchard; Harris; Rafferty; Garred	Hoffer	2:35
12.	"Forgive & Forget"	Pritchard; Cover; Alexis Nuñez	Inflo	3:57
13.	"Ooh La"	Pritchard; Harris; Rafferty; Garred	Hoffer	3:32
14.	"Sway"	Pritchard	Hoffer	3:37
15.	"Eddie's Gun"	Pritchard; Harris; Rafferty; Garred	Hoffer	2:14
16.	"Matchbox"	Pritchard; Harris; Rafferty; Garred	Hoffer	3:12
17.	"Be Who You Are" (Alternative Intro)	Pritchard; Brandon Friesen; Chris Seefried	Friesen	3:54
18.	"Broken Vow"	Pritchard; Friesen; Seefried; Laura Pergolizzi	Friesen	4:26

Digital-only bonus track
No.	Title	Writer(s)	Producer(s)	Length
19.	"Naïve" (The Him Remix)	Pritchard; Harris; Rafferty; Garred	Hoffer	3:27

Deluxe edition bonus disc
No.	Title	Writer(s)	Producer(s)	Length
1.	"Eddie's Gun" (demo)		Paul Stacey	2:11
2.	"Sofa Song" (demo)			2:04
3.	"Pull Me In"	Pritchard; Harris; Rafferty; Garred		3:18
4.	"California"	Mason Jennings	The Kooks	2:10
5.	"Slave to the Game"	Pritchard; Harris; Rafferty; Garred	The Kooks	2:59
6.	"Constantine's Love" (demo)	Pritchard		2:52
7.	"Naïve" (alternate version)		Ian Broudie	3:29
8.	"Suburbs" (demo)	Pritchard		3:11
9.	"Lesson Number 3" (demo)	Pritchard; Harris; Rafferty; Garred		3:30
10.	"The Saboteur" (demo)	Pritchard		4:04
11.	"Shine On" (demo)			2:26
12.	"Disappear" (demo)	Pritchard		3:45
13.	"Catch That" (demo)	Pritchard; Garred	Pritchard	2:13
14.	"Creatures of Habit"	Pritchard; Isom Innis; Sam McCarthy	Innis	4:20
15.	"Lonely Cat" (demo)	Pritchard		3:17
16.	"Gap" (demo)	Pritchard; Harris; Rafferty; Garred		3:49
17.	"Always Where I Need to Be" (demo)			2:34
18.	"If Only" (demo)	Pritchard; Harris; Rafferty; Garred		2:03
19.	"Be Mine" (demo)	Pritchard; Harris; Rafferty; Garred		2:35
20.	"Bus Song"	Pritchard; Harris; Rafferty; Garred	The Kooks	2:04

== Personnel ==
- Luke Pritchard – vocals, guitar
- Hugh Harris – guitar (except tracks 4, 8 and 12), backing vocals
- Peter Denton – bass (tracks 3, 4, 8, 10, 17 and 18), guitar (track 4), backing vocals
- Alexis Nuñez – drums (tracks 4, 8, 12, 17 and 18), bass (track 12)
- Max Rafferty – bass (except tracks 3, 4, 8, 10, 12, 17 and 18), backing vocals
- Paul Garred – drums (except tracks 4, 8, 12, 17 and 18)

== Charts ==
Chart (2017)	Peak position
Belgian Albums (Ultratop Flanders)	47
Belgian Albums (Ultratop Wallonia)	167
Scottish Albums (Official Charts)	15
UK Albums (Official Charts)	18

== Certifications ==
Region	Certification	Certified units/sales
United Kingdom (BPI)	Gold	100,000^{‡}
^{‡} Sales+streaming figures based on certification alone.
