= Let's Go Sunshine =

Studio album by the Kooks
- Released: 31 August 2018
- Recorded: 2015–2018
- Genre: Alternative rock, indie rock
- Length: 53:06
- Label: Lonely Cat
- Producer: Brandon Friesen; Chris Seefried; Luke Pritchard

The Kooks chronology
The Best of... So Far (2017)	Let's Go Sunshine (2018)	10 Tracks to Echo in the Dark (2022)

Singles from Let's Go Sunshine
- 1. "All the Time" Released: 16 May 2018; 2. "No Pressure" Released: 16 May 2018; 3. "Fractured and Dazed" Released: 14 June 2018; 4. "Four Leaf Clover" Released: 19 July 2018; 5. "Chicken Bone" Released: 15 August 2018

Let's Go Sunshine is the fifth studio album by British rock band the Kooks. The follow-up to the 2014 album Listen, it was released on 31 August 2018 through Lonely Cat, making it the band's first album release on an independent label The album charted at number 9 on the UK Albums Chart, giving the band their highest charted release for a decade after their second album Konk, which reached number one in 2008. It is the third and last studio album recorded with bassist Pete Denton, whose departure from the band was announced on 3 January 2019.

The album contains the five released singles "All the Time", "No Pressure", "Fractured and Dazed", "Four Leaf Clover" and the final single, "Chicken Bone".

== Recording ==
Luke Pritchard had already begun talking about the Kooks' fifth album in 2017 while promoting the band's greatest hits compilation, The Best of... So Far, which contained two new songs that were produced by Brandon Friesen who was also overseeing the recording of their new album along with Chris Seefried. Consisting of songs written by Pritchard while the other band members spent time with their families, the new album was deemed to be more of a band effort, as opposed to Listen, which was constructed individually.

Initially, the band had started recording for their fifth album in 2015 with the intent of continuing the flow from the previous record Listen. Unhappy with the results, they decided to scrap the material in favor of starting over in a new direction.

Pritchard stated that he was on a mission to write the best songs he had ever written before bringing them to the band, citing Rubber Soul, Lola and Definitely Maybe as inspirations. He had also gone through some heartbreak and fallen in love during the writing process. The band then decided to write more of the music, particularly the lyrics, before entering the studio to record, as opposed to writing on the fly in the studio as with their previous record.

The Kooks resisted suggestions to become more modern-sounding or to choose particular producers. This informed their decision to work with Friesen, who they felt was an outsider like they were.

Originally, Pritchard had wanted to name the album Weight of the World after one of its songs, as it represented what the entire album stood for. In the end he opted for Let's Go Sunshine, which felt more positive.

== Critical reception ==
Professional ratings
Aggregate scores
Source	Rating
Metacritic	59/100
Review scores
Source	Rating
AllMusic	3.5/5 stars
Clash	6/10
Exclaim!	5/10
NME	2/5 stars
PopMatters	5/10
Q	3/5 stars
The Skinny	4/5 stars

Upon the release of Let's Go Sunshine critical reception to the album was mixed. Review aggregate website Metacritic scored the album 59/100 based on 7 reviews. In AllMusic's review, Neil Z. Yeung called it "a mostly tame affair packed with patient groovers and some lush production" although he was slightly critical of the album's sentimentality, feeling that "it gets bogged down by the contemplative exercises, but resuscitated by the festival-sized anthems punctuated throughout". Clash gave the album a mixed review, writing that "Let's Go Sunshine is a solid album, though not groundbreaking" although did compliment the band on trying new things; "whilst it's not The Kooks we know and love, it still mostly remains true to the indie sound whilst being experimental in parts". Another mixed review came from Exclaim! reviewer Beth Bowles. She was critical of the band apparently playing it safe; "Let's Go Sunshine scarcely veers into experimental territory, and as a result, the tracks lack unique characteristics" and went on to criticise the album as "boring", stating; "While collectively the songs are happy-go-lucky, giving off a carefree tone, at 15 tracks, Let's Go Sunshine gets boring quickly".

== Track listing ==
Let's Go Sunshine track listing
No.	Title	Writer(s)	Producer(s)	Length
1.	"Intro"	Luke Pritchard; Chris Seefried; Hugh Harris	Brandon Friesen; Seefried	0:20
2.	"Kids"	L. Pritchard; Friesen	Friesen	3:40
3.	"All the Time"	L. Pritchard; Friesen; Seefried	Friesen; Seefried	4:06
4.	"Believe"	L. Pritchard; Friesen; Seefried	Friesen; Seefried	4:14
5.	"Fractured and Dazed"	L. Pritchard; Harris	Friesen; Seefried	4:37
6.	"Chicken Bone"	L. Pritchard; Seefried; Friesen; Peter Denton	Friesen; Seefried	3:45
7.	"Four Leaf Clover"	L. Pritchard; Friesen; Seefried	Friesen; Seefried	3:23
8.	"Tesco Disco"	L. Pritchard; Friesen; Seefried	Friesen; Seefried	4:44
9.	"Honey Bee"	L. Pritchard; Bob Pritchard	Seefried	2:17
10.	"Initials for Gainsbourg"	L. Pritchard; Friesen; Seefried	Friesen; Seefried	4:19
11.	"Pamela"	L. Pritchard; Seefried	Friesen; Seefried	3:04
12.	"Picture Frame"	L. Pritchard	Friesen; L. Pritchard	3:40
13.	"Swing Low"	L. Pritchard; Friesen; Seefried	Friesen; Seefried	3:44
14.	"Weight of the World"	L. Pritchard; Seefried	Friesen; Seefried	3:37
15.	"No Pressure"	L. Pritchard; Seefried; Harris	Friesen; Seefried	3:36
Total length:				53:06

Bonus pre-order flexi disc vinyl
No.	Title	Writer(s)	Producer(s)	Length
16.	"The Argument"	L. Pritchard; Friesen; Seefried	Friesen; Seefried

== Personnel ==
- Luke Pritchard – vocals, guitar
- Hugh Harris – guitar, backing vocals
- Peter Denton – bass guitar, backing vocals
- Alexis Nunez – drums, percussion, backing vocals

== Charts ==
Chart performance for Let's Go Sunshine
Chart (2018)	Peak position
Australian Albums (ARIA)	43
Austrian Albums (Ö3 Austria)	64
Belgian Albums (Ultratop Flanders)	27
Belgian Albums (Ultratop Wallonia)	117
Dutch Albums (Album Top 100)	56
German Albums (Offizielle Top 100)	41
Irish Albums (IRMA)	50
Scottish Albums (OCC)	9
Spanish Albums (PROMUSICAE)	67
Swiss Albums (Schweizer Hitparade)	38
UK Albums (OCC)	9
UK Independent Albums (OCC)	3
US Independent Albums (Billboard)	24

== Release history ==
Release history and formats for Let's Go Sunshine
Region	Date	Format	Label	Ref.
Various	31 August 2018	CD, DL, LP	Lonely Cat (KOOKS001-P)	
