= List of songs in Lego Rock Band =

Lego Rock Band is a 2009 music video game developed by Harmonix and Traveller's Tales, and published by MTV Games and Warner Bros. Interactive Entertainment. The game, the fourth major console release in the Rock Band series, was released in November 2009 for the Xbox 360, PlayStation 3, Wii, and Nintendo DS. Lego Rock Band allows one to four players to simulate the playing of rock music by providing the players with peripherals modeled after musical instruments. These include a guitar peripheral for lead guitar and bass gameplay, a drum kit peripheral, and a microphone.

Lego Rock Band's soundtrack has been selected to be "suitable for younger audiences". All songs available in Lego Rock Band are compatible with previous entries in the Rock Band series and until 2014, could be exported to these games for $9.99 along with the use of a unique code included on a paper insert included in the game case.

== Announcement ==
When Lego Rock Band was officially announced on 21 April 2009, only five songs were confirmed to be included: "Song 2" by Blur, "Kung Fu Fighting" by Carl Douglas, "The Final Countdown" by Europe, "Girls & Boys" by Good Charlotte, and "So What" by Pink. Wired published leaked information from "a highly-placed source close to Harmonix" on 31 August, which included the names of thirteen songs which would be included in Lego Rock Band. Additional songs were officially announced closer to the game's release date, including "The Passenger" by Iggy Pop and "Let's Dance" by David Bowie. The full setlist was revealed on 12 October.

== Main setlist ==
The Nintendo DS version of the game features a 25-song subset of the 45 songs in the console versions as listed below, 17 of which are shortened from their console lengths.

Tier	Title	Artist	Year	Genre	Nintendo DS setlist	Rewind DLC
6. Mega Star	"A-Punk"	Vampire Weekend	2008	Rock	Yes	No
3. Rising Star	"Accidentally in Love"	Counting Crows	2004	Rock	Shortened	No
7. Out Of This World	"Aliens Exist"	Blink-182	1999	Punk	No	Yes
6. Mega Star	"Breakout"	Foo Fighters	2000	Alternative	No	Yes
3. Rising Star	"Check Yes Juliet"	We the Kings	2007	Emo	Shortened	Yes
3. Rising Star	"Crash"	The Primitives	1988	Pop/Rock	Yes	No
2. Making Headlines	"Crocodile Rock"	Elton John	1973	Classic Rock	No	No
4. Rock Star	"Dig"	Incubus	2006	Alternative	No	No
2. Making Headlines	"Dreaming of You"	The Coral	2002	Indie Rock	No	No
6. Mega Star	"Every Little Thing She Does Is Magic"	The Police	1981	Pop/Rock	No	No
7. Out Of This World	"Fire"	The Jimi Hendrix Experience	1967	Classic Rock	No	No (Note: Alternative Version available as DLC.)
2. Making Headlines	"Free Fallin'"	Tom Petty	1989	Classic Rock	Shortened	No
3. Rising Star	"Ghostbusters"	Ray Parker Jr.	1984	Other	Shortened	No
2. Making Headlines	"Girls & Boys"	Good Charlotte	2002	Pop/Rock	Shortened	No
5. Super Star	"Grace"	Supergrass	2002	Alternative	Yes	No
5. Super Star	"I Want You Back"	The Jackson 5	1969	Pop/Rock	Shortened	Yes
7. Out Of This World	"In Too Deep"	Sum 41	2001	Punk	Shortened	Yes
5. Super Star	"Kung Fu Fighting"	Carl Douglas	1974	Pop/Rock	Yes	No
1. First Steps	"Let's Dance"	David Bowie	1983	Glam	Shortened	No
6. Mega Star	"Life Is a Highway"	Rascal Flatts	2006	Country	Shortened	No
3. Rising Star	"Make Me Smile (Come Up and See Me)"	Steve Harley & Cockney Rebel	1975	Rock	No	No
5. Super Star	"Monster"	The Automatic	2006	Alternative	Shortened	No
6. Mega Star	"Naïve"	The Kooks	2006	Indie Rock	No	No
7. Out Of This World	"Real Wild Child"	Everlife	2007	Pop/Rock	No	No
1. First Steps	"Ride a White Swan"	T. Rex	1972	Glam	No	No
3. Rising Star	"Rooftops (A Liberation Broadcast)"	Lostprophets	2006	Rock	No	No
4. Rock Star	"Ruby"	Kaiser Chiefs	2007	Indie Rock	Shortened	No
7. Out Of This World	"Short and Sweet"	Spinal Tap	2009	Metal	No	No
4. Rock Star	"So What"	Pink	2008	Pop/Rock	Shortened	No
1. First Steps	"Song 2"	Blur	1997	Alternative	Yes	Yes
6. Mega Star	"Stumble and Fall"	Razorlight	2004	Rock	No	No
7. Out Of This World	"Suddenly I See"	KT Tunstall	2004	Rock	Yes	No
2. Making Headlines	"Summer of '69"	Bryan Adams	1984	Rock	No	No
2. Making Headlines	"Swing, Swing"	The All-American Rejects	2003	Emo	Shortened	Yes
6. Mega Star	"The Final Countdown"	Europe	1986	Metal	Shortened	Yes
4. Rock Star	"The Passenger"	Iggy Pop	1977	Rock	Shortened	No
1. First Steps	"Thunder"	Boys Like Girls	2006	Emo	No	No
5. Super Star	"Tick Tick Boom"	The Hives	2007	Punk	No	No
7. Out Of This World	"Two Princes"	Spin Doctors	1991	Alternative	Shortened	Yes
5. Super Star	"Valerie"	The Zutons	2006	Pop/Rock	No	No
5. Super Star	"Walking on Sunshine"	Katrina & the Waves	1985	Pop/Rock	Shortened	No
1. First Steps	"We Are the Champions"	Queen	1977	Classic Rock	Yes	Yes
1. First Steps	"We Will Rock You"	Queen	1977	Classic Rock	Yes	Yes
4. Rock Star	"Word Up!"	Korn	2004	Nu-Metal	No	No
3. Rising Star	"You Give Love a Bad Name"	Bon Jovi	1986	Rock	No	Yes

== Downloadable songs ==
Lego Rock Band also supports existing downloadable content from the Rock Band series, as well as songs exported from other Rock Band titles that has been "identified to be suitable for all ages", except in the Wii version; however, songs released after Rock Band 3 are not compatible with Lego Rock Band. The Lego Rock Band Music Store only includes Rock Band songs which have been cleared for use in the game. Also, any exported content from the original Rock Band and its Track Packs deemed "Family Friendly" can be used in the game. Users do not need to be signed in to use content that was downloaded on another account, as long as it is on the same console system, thus allowing a child's account to access the filtered set of music from a parent's account library.

== Reception ==
Eurogamer reviewer Keza MacDonald called Lego Rock Band's setlist "an unusual selection ... but undeniably varied", but was disappointed by the small number of songs. Game Informer's Bryan Vore referred to the setlist as being "weak", with "several throwaway tracks you’ll forget the instant they’re over." Jack DeVries, a reviewer for IGN, felt that the game has a varied setlist, but not enough songs compared to Rock Band 2 and Band Hero.
