= Lego Rock Band =

2009 video game

- Developers: TT Fusion; Harmonix; Backbone Entertainment (DS)
- Publisher: Warner Bros. Interactive Entertainment
- Series: Rock Band
- Platforms: Nintendo DS, PlayStation 3, Wii, Xbox 360
- Release: NA: 3 November 2009; AU: 25 November 2009; EU: 27 November 2009
- Genre: Rhythm
- Modes: Single-player, multiplayer

Lego Rock Band is a 2009 rhythm game developed by TT Fusion in partnership with Harmonix and published by Warner Bros. Interactive Entertainment. It is the fifth console installment in the Rock Band series, while it incorporates elements from Lego video games. The game was released on 3 November 2009 for Xbox 360, PlayStation 3, and Wii home consoles in the United States. A Nintendo DS version was also developed by Backbone Entertainment.

The game, as with other games in the Rock Band series, allows up to four players to use instrument controllers to play lead and bass guitar, drums, and vocals on a number of rock music songs. In addition, aspects of building with Lego bricks are incorporated into the game, allowing players to customize their avatars and other band assistants, and include additional Lego-themed gameplay modes. The gameplay and the game's 45-song soundtrack has been selected to create a "family-friendly" game. Players are able to export the songs from the game into other Rock Band titles, while downloadable content that passes family-friendly filters can be incorporated into the game; however, songs released after Rock Band 3 are not compatible due to changes in the song format.

Lego Rock Band was met with moderate reviews, which praised the inclusion of both the Rock Band and Lego video game aspects incorporated into the game, but questioned some selections on the game's soundtrack and some features that would be at odds with the target audience of the game.

== Gameplay ==
Lego Rock Band's gameplay is similar to that of other Rock Band games. The vocals line scrolls along the top, while the instruments have tracks at the bottom of the screen. Here, guitar, drums, and bass are all being played on the song "We Will Rock You" by Queen. In the background, Lego Minifigure avatars of Brian May (left) and Freddie Mercury (right) play along to the song.

Lego Rock Band is based primarily on the same gameplay as the main Rock Band series, though it includes aspects of collecting and building with Lego bricks as in Traveller's Tales's other Lego-themed games. Up to four local players can play lead and bass guitar, drums, or vocals across the songs in the game using specially designed Rock Band or Guitar Hero controllers. During each song, players attempt to match notes (shown as Lego bricks) as they scroll on-screen in time with the current song. On lead and bass guitar, notes are hit by holding down the frets indicated on-screen and using the controller's strum bar when the note passes through the target area of the track. Drummers simply hit one of the four colored drum pads indicated as the notes cross the target area, with wide orange notes indicating kick drum notes. Singers have to sing in relative pitch to the song's original pitch.

Completing consecutive series of notes will build up a player's scoring multiplier and add to the band's total Lego "studs" (equivalent to points) for the song. Certain phrases of notes are glowing "energy phrases"; successfully completing these adds energy to the player's "Overdrive" meter. When they have enough energy, a player can activate Overdrive to double the band's studs multiplier. Players are rewarded with up to 5 stars for completing a song based on their performance.

Players can choose from five difficulties ("Super Easy", "Easy", "Medium", "Hard", and "Expert") at the start of each song, with higher difficulties generally having more notes of the song in the track. Super Easy is a difficulty unique to Lego Rock Band. Super Easy uses the same charts as Easy, but on Super Easy it doesn't matter what pitch is hit for vocals, which fret is held for guitar and bass so long as the player strums in time, or which drum head is hit for drums. Lego Rock Band also includes other features not found in Rock Band 2 to make the game easier, such as an "Automatic Kick Drum" modifier which eliminates the need to use the drum controller's bass drum pedal. It is also impossible to fail a song when a player is performing poorly; instead, poor performances consume studs that have already been earned for the song, although the player will have a chance to recover lost studs before the end of the song. Certain songs which feature long intros or outros, such as "Every Little Thing She Does Is Magic" by The Police, can also be played in "Short Song Mode", in order to help younger players with shorter attention spans stay interested in the game.

=== Game modes ===
The main game mode is the "Story Mode", which is structured similarly to the "Tour" mode of the other Rock Band games. The Story mode follows the player's band through their career, starting by playing gigs at smaller venues and taking requests for special performances. New gigs, venues, and vehicles to get to those venues are unlocked as the band earns stars and fans. By completing gigs, players earn objects they can use to customize their Lego avatars, decorate their "Rock Den", or buy staff members to help their band earn fans and studs. The story mode also includes special gigs called "Rock Power Challenges" in which the band uses the "power of rock" to complete a task such as demolishing a building or escaping a dinosaur, by playing a select song from the setlist which is in-context with the task at hand. During Rock Power Challenges, players take turns playing sections of the song rather, and poor performances can lead to failure of the challenge. Players can also play in "Free Play" mode which allows them to play any song without having to enter Story Mode.

=== Nintendo DS version ===
Gameplay in the Nintendo DS version of Lego Rock Band is similar to the PlayStation Portable game Rock Band Unplugged. The DS version includes the same musician avatars, here of Queen, as the console games (with the exception of Spinal Tap).

The Nintendo DS version of Lego Rock Band is similar to the PlayStation Portable game Rock Band Unplugged and the Nintendo DS version of Rock Band 3. During each song, the player switches between the various instruments, trying to keep all four members of the band "happy"; this is done by successfully completing a series of notes for the specific instrument, and then correctly hitting a final, purple note to increase that band member's happiness. Band members' happiness will fall over time, requiring the player to continually switch between band members to maintain the band's overall mood and score multiplier. The game uses the touchpad, stylus, and face buttons of the DS, and does not require or support additional peripherals like the console versions do. Up to four people can play at a time, each using a separate DS and playing their own instrument.

== Soundtrack ==
Lego Rock Band's 45-song soundtrack was selected to be "suitable for younger audiences", unlike those of other Rock Band games. The Nintendo DS version of the game features a 25-song subset of the songs in the console versions.

The Lego Rock Band Music Store includes downloadable content (DLC) from the standard Rock Band Music Store which has "been identified to be suitable for all ages". Also, any songs exported from the original Rock Band and its Track Packs deemed "Family Friendly" can be used in the game. All songs available in Lego Rock Band are compatible with other entries in the Rock Band series and can be exported to those games for US$9.99 along with the use of a unique code included on a paper insert included in the game case. Songs from the Rock Band Network cannot be played in Lego Rock Band due to the songs being unrated. No songs released as DLC after Rock Band 3's release are compatible with previous games, including Lego Rock Band, due to changes in the file format. The Wii version of the game cannot use any downloaded or exported songs, and its songs cannot be exported to other games. As of 5 years after the game's release, it is no longer possible to export the in game songs.

== Development ==
Industry rumors circulated in early 2009 of the game's existence and appeared to be true when mention of the game was shown in a slide (that was later removed) in Harmonix's Dan Teasdale's presentation at the 2009 Game Developers Conference. The game was announced officially on 21 April 2009. TT Fusion's head of animation, Matt Palmer, stated that Harmonix had approached Traveller's Tales who, in turn, approached TT Fusion on the game concept around October 2008. At that time, about 50% of the studio was against the concept, but had come around by the end of 2008, realizing that they "weren’t just skinning one franchise on another". Despite skepticism for the viability of the game, the game is stated to combine "two compelling properties" by Traveller's Tales managing director Tom Stone, and has been called "a social game experience that crosses every generation and every genre of rock" by MTV Games senior vice president Bob Picunko.

Iggy Pop voices the in-game tutorials for the game, and lends his trademark shirtless image to a Lego avatar for the game. David Bowie, along with his band and a venue loosely based on his music video for "Let's Dance", also appears in the game. The bands Queen, Blur, and Spinal Tap have Lego avatars for the game (in the Nintendo DS version, however, the Spinal Tap minifigures are not available). In the case of Queen guitarist Brian May, he had required that the developers represent his hair style on his Lego caricature. John Drake of Harmonix stated the presence of Pop and Bowie add "rock credibility" to the family-friendly title. TT Fusion opted to map the motions of the Lego mini-figurines to key frame animation instead of motion capture which had been used on previous Rock Band titles, as it allowed for them to animate more exaggerated motions and effects.

== Reception ==
Reception

Aggregate scores
Aggregator	Score			
Aggregator	DS	PS3	Wii	Xbox 360
GameRankings	78.86%	76.4%	69.5%	73.4%
Metacritic	80/100	75/100	70/100	71/100

Review scores
Publication	Score			
Publication	DS	PS3	Wii	Xbox 360
1Up.com		B+		B+
Eurogamer		7/10		7/10
Game Informer		8/10	8/10	8/10
GamePro		3.5/5	3.5/5	3.5/5
GameSpot		7.5/10	7/10	7.5/10
GameSpy		3/5		3/5
GamesRadar+	8/10	8/10	7/10	8/10
IGN	8.4/10	7/10	5.5/10	7/10
Official Nintendo Magazine			58%	
TeamXbox				8.3/10

Game Informer gave the game a score of 8 of 10, praising some of its new features like the Super Easy mode, but criticizing the soundtrack as hit and miss, and a bit repetitive if the player does not have any downloaded songs. Jack DeVries of IGN gave the PlayStation 3 and Xbox 360 versions a 7.0/10, calling the presentation "adorable" and "just so damn cute", but still thinks of this game as "half a game for the full price" mainly because of the reduced soundtrack. The Wii version fared less well, receiving a 5.5/10, due to "terrible looks" and "hard to read text." In contrast, the DS version scored an impressive 8.4 from IGN's Craig Harris, who praised it as feeling fresh and new compared to the console versions. GameTrailers gave the game 7.9 criticising the lack of previous features such as online play, and called the Lego presentation superficial, saying the purchase decision will lie squarely on the song preferences. The game has sold approximately 600,000 units by March 2010.

During the 13th Annual Interactive Achievement Awards, Lego Rock Band was nominated for "Family Game of the Year" by the Academy of Interactive Arts & Sciences, but ultimately lost to The Beatles: Rock Band. The nominees also included Guitar Hero 5, Wii Fit Plus, and Wii Sports Resort.
