= Shine On (The Kooks song) =

Single by The Kooks

from the album Konk
- Released: 7 July 2008
- Recorded: 2007
- Genre: Indie pop
- Length: 3:15
- Label: Virgin
- Songwriter: Luke Pritchard

The Kooks singles chronology
"Always Where I Need to Be" (2008)	"Shine On" (2008)	"Sway" (2008)

"Shine On" is a song by British indie rock band The Kooks and is the second single from their 2008 album Konk. It was released on 7 July 2008. Although debuting at number 63 on the UK Singles Chart, the song received substantial airplay, becoming a radio hit. The release of "Shine On" also boosted Konk back into the top 40 of the UK Albums Chart. Upon the physical release of "Shine On", the single climbed to number 25, the band's lowest charting single since "Sofa Song".

"Shine On" was also featured in a Michelob Ultra TV commercial.

== Track listings ==
UK CD

1. "Shine On"
2. "Luby Loo"

7" Vinyl

1. "Shine On"
2. "Come On Down"

Digital iTunes EP

1. "Shine On"
2. "Shine On" (acoustic version from Q101, Chicago)
3. "Luby Loo"
4. "Come On Down"

== Music video ==
The music video was made available on The Kooks official website and YouTube on 23 May 2008. It features the band playing the song in a small room while water is dripping from the ceiling.

== Promotion ==
On 3 July 2008 The Kooks performed a live session on BBC Radio 1. During Jo Whiley's Live Lounge they played a special version of "Shine On" plus a cover of Coldplay's song "Violet Hill".

The Kooks also played the song live on Graham Norton's TV programme.

The song was played in the John Lewis 'Through The Ages' advert in 2011.

== Charts ==
Chart (2008)	Peak position
UK Singles Chart	25
Irish Singles Chart	32
Scotland Singles (OCC)	19
Swiss Singles Chart	86
