= Eddie's Gun =

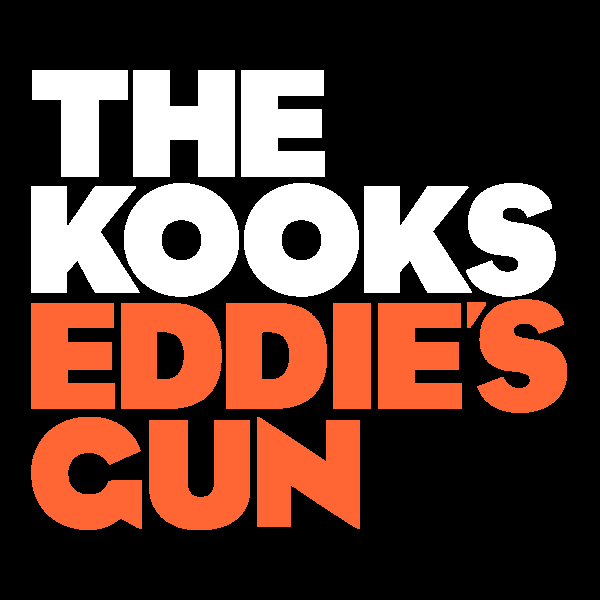

Single by the Kooks

from the album Inside In/Inside Out
- B-side: "Bus Song", "California"
- Released: 11 July 2005
- Length: 2:13
- Label: Virgin
- Songwriter(s): Luke Pritchard, Hugh Harris, Max Rafferty and Paul Garred.
- Producer(s): Paul Stacey

The Kooks singles chronology
"Eddie's Gun" (2005)	"Sofa Song" (2005)

"Eddie's Gun" is the debut single of English indie rock band the Kooks, released in the United Kingdom on 11 July 2005. A different version appears on the band's debut album, Inside In/Inside Out (2006). The song is a tongue-in-cheek look at erectile dysfunction, not a tale of lead singer Luke Pritchard's unrequited love for ex-girlfriend Katie Melua, as some (including music magazine NME) have suggested.

== Other versions ==
An alternative version of the song, titled "Eddie's Gun- 2005 Version" is featured on The Kooks' album The Best of... So Far.

== Track listings ==
7-inch (VS2000)

1. "Eddie's Gun" – 2:13
2. "Bus Song" – 2:02

CD (VSCDT2000)

1. "Eddie's Gun" – 2:13
2. "California" (Originally by Mason Jennings) – 2:08

== Charts ==
Chart (2005)	Peak position
Scotland (OCC)	45
UK Singles (OCC)	35
