= You Don't Love Me (The Kooks song) =

2006 single by the Kooks

Single by the Kooks

from the album Inside In/Inside Out
- Released: 9 January 2006
- Length: 2:35
- Label: Virgin
- Songwriter(s): Luke Pritchard, Hugh Harris, Max Rafferty, Paul Garred
- Producer(s): Tony Hoffer

The Kooks singles chronology
"Sofa Song" (2005)	"You Don't Love Me" (2006)	"Naïve" (2006)

"You Don't Love Me" is a song by British indie rock band the Kooks from their 2006 debut album, Inside In / Inside Out. It was released 9 January 2006 as the lead single from that album, charting at number 12 in the UK Singles Chart.

== Track listings ==
- CD (VSCDT1910)
1. "You Don't Love Me" – 2:35
2. "Slave to the Game" – 3:00
- 7-inch (VS1910)
1. "You Don't Love Me" – 2:35
2. "Lonely Cat" – 3:00
- Maxi-CD (VSCDX1910)
1. "You Don't Love Me" (live at the Garage) – 2:50
2. "See the World" (acoustic - live at Abbey Road) – 2:25
3. "The Window Song"
4. "You Don't Love Me" (video)
5. "See the World" (video)

== Charts ==
=== Weekly charts ===
Chart (2006)	Peak position
Scotland (OCC)	14
UK Singles (OCC)	12

=== Year-end charts ===
Chart (2006)	Position
UK Singles (OCC)	216
