= Junk of the Heart (Happy) =

- Cover of the EP release

Single by The Kooks

from the album Junk of the Heart
- Released: 2011
- Genre: Indie rock
- Length: 3:08
- Label: Virgin
- Songwriters: Luke Pritchard; Tony Hoffer

"Junk of the Heart (Happy)" is a song by British rock band the Kooks, and the second single and opening track from their 2011 album Junk of the Heart.

== Release and reception ==
AllMusic described the song as a "jangly, Dodgy-esque, summery opening title track". "Junk of the Heart" was released as the second single from Junk of the Heart in 2011 as a promo CD single. It was also released as a digital EP and was included on the 2017 greatest hits album The Best of... So Far.

The song reached No. 20 on the Billboard Alternative Songs chart in the US, the top 10 in Australia and Flanders, the top 20 in Japan, and the top 30 in Italy and Wallonia.

== Charts ==
=== Weekly charts ===
Chart (2011)	Peak position
Australia Hitseekers (ARIA)	10
Belgium (Ultratip Bubbling Under Flanders)	7
Belgium (Ultratip Bubbling Under Wallonia)	27
Germany (GfK)	93
Italy (FIMI)	23
Japan (Japan Hot 100)	18
Switzerland Airplay (Schweizer Hitparade)	58
US Alternative Songs (Billboard)	20

== Certifications ==
Region	Certification	Certified units/sales
United Kingdom (BPI)	Silver	200,000^{‡}
^{‡} Sales+streaming figures based on certification alone.
