= Always Where I Need to Be =

2008 single by the Kooks

Single by the Kooks

from the album Konk
- B-side: "Walk Away"; "Always Free"; "Mrs. Thompson"
- Released: 19 March 2008
- Genre: Indie rock
- Length: 2:42
- Label: Virgin
- Songwriter: Luke Pritchard
- Producer: Tony Hoffer

The Kooks singles chronology
"Pull Me In" (2007)	"Always Where I Need to Be" (2008)	"Shine On" (2008)

"Always Where I Need to Be" is a song by British rock band the Kooks from their second studio album, Konk (2008). It was released in Japan on 19 March 2008 and in the United Kingdom on 31 March. In the UK, the song debuted at number 71 on the UK Singles Chart via download sales alone and jumped to its peak at number three the following week, giving the band their highest-charting homeland single. The video shows the band members playing their instruments in various parts of New York City, including Central Park and Coney Island.

== Track listings ==
UK CD1

1. "Always Where I Need to Be"
2. "Always Where I Need to Be" (video)

UK CD2

1. "Always Where I Need to Be"
2. "Walk Away"
3. "Always Free"

UK 7-inch single

A. "Always Where I Need to Be"
B. "Mrs. Thompson"

Japanese CD single

1. "Always Where I Need to Be"
2. "Slave to the Game"
3. "Something to Say"
4. "Naïve" (live)

== Charts ==
=== Weekly charts ===
Chart (2008)	Peak position
Australia (ARIA)	84
Austria (Ö3 Austria Top 40)	63
Belgium (Ultratop 50 Flanders)	19
Belgium (Ultratip Bubbling Under Wallonia)	4
CIS Airplay (TopHit)	174
Czech Republic Airplay (ČNS IFPI)	67
Europe (Eurochart Hot 100)	10
Germany (GfK)	55
Ireland (IRMA)	15
Italy (FIMI)	41
Netherlands (Dutch Top 40)	27
Netherlands (Single Top 100)	43
New Zealand (Recorded Music NZ)	40
Scottish Singles Sales (Official Charts)	6
Switzerland (Schweizer Hitparade)	53
UK Singles (Official Charts)	3
US Modern Rock Tracks (Billboard)	22

=== Year-end charts ===
Chart (2008)	Position
UK Singles (OCC)	104

== Certifications ==
Region	Certification	Certified units/sales
United Kingdom (BPI)	Gold	400,000^{‡}
^{‡} Sales+streaming figures based on certification alone.

== Release history ==
Region	Date	Format(s)	Label(s)	Ref.
Japan	19 March 2008	CD	Virgin	
United Kingdom	31 March 2008	7-inch vinyl; CD	Virgin	
Australia	5 April 2008	CD	Virgin	

== In popular culture ==
"Always Where I Need to Be" features on the soundtrack to the video game by EA Sports, FIFA 09. This song is available in the PlayStation 3 Singstore, for the game Singstar. This song is also used as background music on ABC's commercials for Scrubs season eight premiering in 2009. The song has been featured several episodes of MTV Latin America Acapulco Shore.
