= Bad Habit (The Kooks song) =

2014 song by The Kooks

Single by the Kooks

from the album Listen
- Released: 15 July 2014
- Recorded: Los Angeles and London
- Length: 3:43
- Label: Virgin EMI
- Songwriters: Luke Pritchard; Inflo (Dean Josiah); Peter Danton
- Producer: Inflo

The Kooks singles chronology
"Around Town" (2014)	"Bad Habit" (2014)	"Forgive & Forget" (2014)

"Bad Habit" is a song by the British rock band the Kooks. It was released on 15 July 2014 as the third single from the album Listen, reaching No. 24 on the Billboard Alternative Songs chart. and No. 20 in Belgium. It has been certified silver in the UK.

== Charts ==
Chart performance for "Bad Habit"
Chart	Peak position
US Billboard Alternative	24
Belgium (Ultratop 50)	20
