= Sway (The Kooks song) =

Single by The Kooks

from the album Konk
- Released: 13 October 2008
- Genre: Post-punk
- Length: 3:36
- Label: Virgin
- Songwriter: Luke Pritchard

The Kooks singles chronology
| "Shine On" (2008) | "Sway" (2008) | "Is It Me" (2011) |

"Sway" is a song by British indie rock band The Kooks and is the third and final single of their second album Konk. It was released physically on 10 October 2008. The track is also featured on the I Love You, Beth Cooper soundtrack.

== Track listings ==
Promo CD

1. "Sway" (Radio Mix)
2. "Sway" (Album Version)
3. "Sway" (Instrumental)

CD

1. "Sway" (Radio Mix)
2. "Stole Away" (Demo)

7" Vinyl [1]

1. "Sway"
2. "It Can Be So Hard" (Demo)

7" Vinyl [2]

1. "Sway" (Radio Mix)
2. "Sway" (Live Woodstock Session)

Digital iTunes bundle

1. "Sway" (Radio Mix)
2. "Sway" (Live Woodstock Session)
3. "Stole Away" (Demo)
4. "It Can Be So Hard" (Demo)

== Charts ==
"Sway" originally charted on downloads alone on the week of the album's release, it entered the UK charts at 90, the next week it dropped out of the charts, then it re-entered a week before its physical release at 89, on downloads alone, upon its physical release it jumped to 41, making it their only song to peak outside of the top 40.

== Chart performance ==
| Chart (2008) | Peak position |
|---|---|
| UK Singles Chart | 41 |
