= 10 Tracks to Echo in the Dark =

Studio album by The Kooks
- Released: 22 July 2022
- Recorded: 2019–2021
- Genre: Alternative rock; indie rock
- Length: 32:14
- Label: Lonely Cat; AWAL
- Producer: Tobias Kuhn and Luke Pritchard

The Kooks chronology
Let's Go Sunshine (2018)	10 Tracks to Echo in the Dark (2022)	Never/Know (2025)

Singles from 10 Tracks to Echo in the Dark
- 1. "Connection" Released: 27 January 2022; 2. "Beautiful World" Released: 21 April 2022; 3. "Cold Heart" Released: 24 June 2022

10 Tracks to Echo in the Dark is the sixth studio album by British rock band The Kooks. The follow-up to the 2018 album Let's Go Sunshine, it was produced by Tobias Kuhn and the band's lead singer Luke Pritchard, and released on 22 July 2022 through the band's independent label Lonely Cat with distribution by AWAL. It is the first album recorded by the band as a trio following the departure of bassist Pete Denton in late 2018.

== Background ==
Following the Brexit referendum, Luke Pritchard wanted to maintain The Kooks' European connection by going to Berlin to work with writer and producer Tobias Kuhn. After coming up with five tracks, the COVID-19 pandemic brought work to a halt in March 2020, which meant Pritchard had to return to the U.K. and continue the writing sessions with Kuhn via Zoom. Afterwards, Kuhn traveled to London to record with the band.

== Release ==
With a desire to do new things, The Kooks chose to release the songs from 10 Tracks to Echo in the Dark as a series of EPs. Connection - Echo in the Dark Part 1 - containing "Connection", "Jesse James" and "Modern Days" - was released on 27 January 2022, followed by Beautiful World - Echo in the Dark Part 2 containing "Closer", "Beautiful World" and "25" - on 21 April 2022. The single "Cold Heart" was released on 27 June 2022, with the remaining songs—"Oasis", "Sailing on a Dream" and "Without a Doubt"—being issued as part of the album on 22 July 2022.

== Track listing ==
All tracks are written by Luke Pritchard and Tobias Kuhn unless stated otherwise.

10 Tracks to Echo in the Dark track listing
No.	Title	Writer(s)	Producer(s)	Length
1.	"Connection"		Kuhn; Pritchard	3:47
2.	"Cold Heart"		Kuhn; Pritchard	4:43
3.	"Jesse James"	Pritchard; Hugh Harris; Kuhn	Kuhn; Pritchard	2:54
4.	"Closer"		Kuhn; Pritchard	3:41
5.	"Sailing on a Dream"	Pritchard; Alexis Nunez; Kuhn	Kuhn; Pritchard	3:11
6.	"Beautiful World" (with Milky Chance)	Pritchard; Clemens Rehbein; Philipp Dausch; Kuhn	Kuhn; Pritchard	3:04
7.	"Modern Days"		Kuhn; Pritchard	2:51
8.	"Oasis"		Kuhn; Pritchard	1:53
9.	"25"		Kuhn; Pritchard	3:44
10.	"Without a Doubt" (featuring Neiked)	Pritchard; Victor Rådström	Rådström	2:26
Total length:				32:14

== Personnel ==
The Kooks

- Luke Pritchard – vocals, guitar, bass
- Hugh Harris – guitar, synthesizer, backing vocals
- Alexis Nunez – drums, percussion, backing vocals

Additional personnel

- Tobias Kuhn – production (except track 10), recording engineer (except track 10), bass (track 2)
- Pete Randall – bass (track 9)
- Victor Rådström – production (track 10), mixing (track 10)
- Craig Silvey – mixing (except tracks 6, 8 and 10)
- Nikodem Milewski – mixing (track 6)
- Paul Mühlhaüser – mixing (track 8)
- John Davis – mastering
- Dani Bennett Spragg – mix engineer (except tracks 6, 8 and 10)
- Rob Wilks – recording engineer (tracks 1, 4, 5, 8 and 9)
- Jonas Halle – recording engineer (tracks 2, 4, 6 and 9)
- Max Margolis – recording engineer (tracks 5, 6 and 9)
- Darren Jones – recording engineer (track 9)

== Charts ==
Chart performance for 10 Tracks to Echo in the Dark
Chart (2022)	Peak position
German Albums (Offizielle Top 100)	22
Scottish Albums (OCC)	7
Swiss Albums (Schweizer Hitparade)	62
UK Albums (OCC)	32
