= Konk (album) =

Studio album by the Kooks
- Released: 14 April 2008
- Recorded: 2007
- Studios: Konk Studios, London
- Genre: Indie rock
- Length: 43:47
- Label: Virgin
- Producer: Tony Hoffer

The Kooks chronology
Inside In/Inside Out (2006)	Konk (2008)	Junk of the Heart (2011)

RAK
- Cover of the special edition which includes bonus disc RAK.

Singles from Konk
- 1. "Always Where I Need to Be" Released: 19 March 2008; 2. "Shine On" Released: 7 July 2008; 3. "Sway" Released: 13 October 2008

Professional ratings
Aggregate scores
Source	Rating
Metacritic	65/100
Review scores
Source	Rating
AllMusic	4.5/5 stars
BBC	(Mixed)
Digital Spy	2/5 stars
Drowned in Sound	(1/10)
NME	(5/10)
Pitchfork Media	(4.9/10)
Spin	3/5 stars
The Times	3/5 stars
The Independent	4/5 stars
The Guardian	4/5 stars

Konk is the second album by British indie rock band the Kooks, released on 14 April 2008 on Virgin Records. Produced by Tony Hoffer, the album is named after the London studio where it was recorded, which is the property of Ray Davies. This was the last album to feature original bassist Max Rafferty.

== Writing and recording ==
As early as October 2006, nine months after the release of their platinum debut album Inside In/Inside Out, lead singer Luke Pritchard was already claiming that the Kooks' second album would be "fucking amazing. We're going to take our time and release it when we feel it's ready." In January 2007, it was reported that the Kooks had returned to their studio in Brighton to begin work on the album, with Pritchard admitting that they had "tons of new tunes."

The album was recorded with producer Tony Hoffer at Konk Studios in London, with the band taking advantage of their debut album's success by having a bigger recording budget that enabled them to use better equipment. "We wanted this album to sound more epic than the last one," said Pritchard.

Being fans of the Kinks, the Kooks were excited by the prospect of recording at a studio started and run by their idols. "When we got here first we were very excited because this building has yielded some amazing music -- stuff that I still listen to all the time. You can't help but be inspired by making an album here," said Pritchard. The band had been prolific songwriters during their two years on tour, and even considered making their sophomore effort a double album.

However, tensions would occur due to bassist Max Rafferty. The band's issues with Rafferty eventually came to a head and he was fired on 29 January 2008 after the album's completion and before its release. Remarking on Rafferty's sacking, Pritchard commented, "In my opinion he's going through a lot in his life, and being in a band doesn't help that kind of stuff." In another interview, guitarist Hugh Harris added, "You’ve got to believe in what you’re doing. You’ve got to have some sort of drive. If you don’t think the music you’re playing is the best in the world then why would you be in that band?"

Rafferty's departure made the band consider splitting up, but they soon reconvened with Dan Logan, formerly of Cat the Dog, a fellow Brighton band that also shared management with the Kooks. On 2 March 2008, Logan participated in a Mike Crossey-produced recording session at RAK Studios that yielded RAK, a nine-song disc that was packaged with the special edition of Konk.

== Chart performance ==
Konk was released on 11 April 2008 and went on to debut on the UK Albums Chart at number one with first week sales of 65,901 units. The album spent one week atop the UK Albums chart, before falling to number two in its second week. In total, Konk spent fourteen non-consecutive weeks in the UK top 40 albums chart. The album also spawned three top 50 hits including "Always Where I Need to Be", which peaked at number three and remains their highest charting single to date. In the United States, it reached number 41 on the Billboard 200 and the album's first single, "Always Where I Need to Be", peaked at number 22 on the Alternative Songs chart. The album was certified gold in both the UK and Ireland, and has since gone on to reach platinum certification in the UK with the aid of streaming.

== Promotion ==
"Mr. Maker" was heard on the Grownups episode "Winks", "Do You Wanna" was featured on The CW's Gossip Girl In the 18 episode of Season 1, "Much I 'Do' about anything, while "Love It All" was featured on the Chuck episode "Chuck Versus the Seduction". "Always Where I Need to Be", "See the Sun", "Love It All", "Shine On" and "Mr. Maker" were all featured in the fourth series of the BBC 1 drama Waterloo Road. "Shine On" was used on a variety of commercials as well.

After initially promoting the album with Logan until September 2008, bass duties for the remainder of the album cycle were taken over by Pete Denton, who had also previously filled in for Rafferty and would eventually become a full member of the band. Drummer Paul Garred would also be forced to abandon touring for three months in mid-2008 due to an injury to his left arm; he was initially replaced on tour by Nick Millard (formerly of Crackout) before returning. Garred then left again in late 2009, and Chris Prendergast, who had been the drummer for Kooks tourmate Kid Harpoon, joined in 2010 as both live drummer and band member during initial sessions for the next album.

== Reception ==
AllMusic said with Konk, the Kooks "explores pop and rock in all their glory," while BBC Music described their second album as "a little contrived with the recycling of old guitar lines and intros." NME suggested the departure of Rafferty affected Konk's production, stating "Konk is the sound of a band in disarray, unsuccessfully attempting to hold things together."

In 2011, Rafferty said that his dissatisfaction with the album was because "it wasn’t written in the same way (as the first album) so there wasn’t the same vibe about it. We just didn’t collaborate on the songs in the same way as we did on the first one."

== Track listing ==
Konk CDV3043
No.	Title	Writer(s)	Length
1.	"See the Sun"	Luke Pritchard; Paul Garred	3:36
2.	"Always Where I Need to Be"	Pritchard	2:41
3.	"Mr. Maker"	Pritchard	3:00
4.	"Do You Wanna"	Pritchard	4:06
5.	"Gap"	Garred; Pritchard; Hugh Harris	4:00
6.	"Love It All"	Pritchard; Max Rafferty	2:50
7.	"Stormy Weather"	Pritchard	4:01
8.	"Sway"	Pritchard	3:36
9.	"Shine On"	Pritchard	3:14
10.	"Down to the Market"	Pritchard	2:27
11.	"One Last Time"	Pritchard	2:38
12.	"Tick of Time"	Pritchard	4:25
13.	"All Over Town" (hidden track)	Pritchard	3:14

iTunes Bonus Tracks
No.	Title	Writer(s)	Length
14.	"Bad Taste in My Mouth" (iTunes bonus track)	Pritchard	3:27
15.	"Vicious" (iTunes pre-order bonus track)	Pritchard	3:23

RAK CDVX3043
No.	Title	Writer(s)	Length
1.	"Watching the Ships Roll In"	Pritchard	3:21
2.	"Eaten By Your Lover"	Garred	1:05
3.	"No Longer"	Harris	3:44
4.	"Fa La La"	Harris; Pritchard	3:01
5.	"Nothing Ever Changes"	Garred; Pritchard	2:15
6.	"By My Side"	Harris	2:47
7.	"Hatful of Love"	Pritchard	3:32
8.	"See the Sun" (Alternate Version)	Garred; Pritchard	2:03
9.	"Brooklyn" (Home Demo)	Pritchard	2:25

== Personnel ==
The Kooks

- Luke Pritchard – lead vocals, guitar
- Hugh Harris – guitar, backing vocals, lead vocals (RAK tracks 3, 4 and 6)
- Max Rafferty – bass, backing vocals
- Paul Garred – drums

Additional personnel

- Tony Hoffer – production
- Stevie Blacke – strings (tracks 7 and 8)
- Mike Crossey – production (RAK)
- Dan Logan – bass (RAK)

== Release history ==
Region	Date
Europe	11 April 2008
United Kingdom	14 April 2008
United States	15 April 2008

== Charts and certifications ==
=== Weekly charts ===
Chart (2008)	Peak position
Australian Albums (ARIA)	8
Austrian Albums (Ö3 Austria)	6
Belgian Albums (Ultratop Flanders)	4
Belgian Albums (Ultratop Wallonia)	32
Canadian Albums (Billboard)	15
European Top 100 Albums (Billboard)	4
Italian Albums (FIMI)	24
Dutch Albums (Album Top 100)	7
French Albums (SNEP)	20
German Albums (Offizielle Top 100)	6
Irish Albums (IRMA)	2
New Zealand Albums (RMNZ)	12
Norwegian Albums (VG-lista)	27
Scottish Albums (Official Charts)	1
Swedish Albums (Sverigetopplistan)	32
Spanish Albums (Promusicae)	95
Swiss Albums (Schweizer Hitparade)	9
UK Albums (Official Charts)	1
US Billboard 200	41
US Digital Albums (Billboard)	107
US Top Rock Albums (Billboard)	12
US Top Alternative Albums (Billboard)	10

=== Year-end charts ===
Chart (2008)	Position
Belgian Albums (Ultratop Flanders)	79
Dutch Albums (Album Top 100)	89
UK Albums (OCC)	56

=== Certifications ===
Region	Certification	Certified units/sales
Australia (ARIA)	Gold	35,000^{^}
Ireland (IRMA)	Gold	7,500^{^}
United Kingdom (BPI)	Platinum	300,000^{‡}
^{^} Shipments figures based on certification alone.^{‡} Sales+streaming figures based on certification alone.
