= Down (The Kooks song) =

Single by the Kooks

from the album Listen
- Released: 18 April 2014
- Recorded: Los Angeles, United States; London, United Kingdom
- Genre: Indie rock; soul; indie pop
- Length: 2:41
- Label: Virgin EMI
- Songwriter(s): Luke Pritchard, Inflo (Dean Josiah)
- Producer(s): Inflo

The Kooks singles chronology
| "Rosie" (2013) | "Down" (2014) | "Around Town" (2014) |

"Down" is a song by British rock band the Kooks. It was released on 18 April 2014 through Virgin EMI Records as the lead single from the band's fourth studio album Listen, which was scheduled to be released on 1 September 2014. The song debuted on UK Singles Chart at number 40. It has also reportedly divided fans.

== Background and release ==
"Down" is the first song released by the Kooks since their 2012 single "Rosie". The song was written by the band's frontman Luke Pritchard and hip-hop pioneer Inflo for the band's upcoming studio album Listen. "Down" was recorded in Los Angeles and London. According to reports, the song is "a mission statement from a band that have rediscovered what they loved about making music in the first place." The R&B-inspired track features "looped hooks and crazy percussion" and has a "contagious swagger."

The song premiered on 11 March 2014 on BBC Radio 1 as Zane Lowe's 'Hottest Record'. It was released digitally on 18 April 2014, and as a 7" vinyl on 21 April 2014.

== Music video ==
A music video for the song was released onto YouTube on 20 March 2014. It was directed by Davis Silis.

== Track listing ==
Digital download
| No. | Title | Length |
|---|---|---|
| 1. | "Down" | 2:41 |
| 2. | "Hooray for Henry" | 3:46 |
| 3. | "Hold On" | 2:42 |
| 4. | "Melody Maker" | 2:24 |

7" vinyl
| No. | Title | Length |
|---|---|---|
| 1. | "Down" | 2:41 |
| 2. | "Hooray for Henry" | 3:46 |

== Personnel ==
The Kooks

- Luke Pritchard – vocals, guitar, co-production
- Hugh Harris – guitar
- Peter Denton – bass
- Alexis Nunez – drums

Additional personnel

- Inflo – production

== Charts ==
| Chart (2014) | Peak position |
|---|---|
| Belgium (Ultratip Bubbling Under Flanders) | 19 |
| Belgium (Ultratip Bubbling Under Wallonia) | 25 |
| Scotland (OCC) | 48 |
| UK Singles (OCC) | 40 |

== Release history ==
| Region | Date | Label | Format | Ref. |
|---|---|---|---|---|
| United Kingdom | 18 April 2014 | Virgin EMI Records | Digital download | |
| United Kingdom | 21 April 2014 | Virgin EMI Records | 7" vinyl | |
