= Sofa Song =

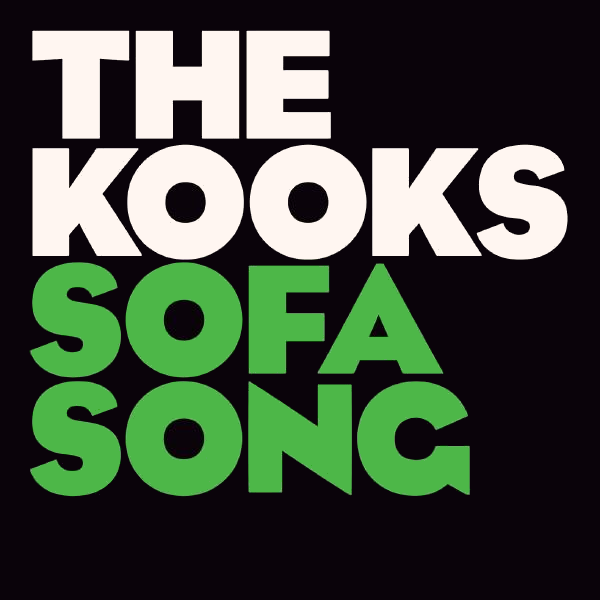

Single by the Kooks

from the album Inside In/Inside Out
- Released: 17 October 2005
- Genre: Indie rock. Post-britpop
- Length: 2:13
- Label: Virgin
- Songwriters: Luke Pritchard, Hugh Harris, Max Rafferty, Paul Garred
- Producer: Tony Hoffer

The Kooks singles chronology
| "Eddie's Gun" (2005) | "Sofa Song" (2005) | "You Don't Love Me" (2006) |

DVD cover
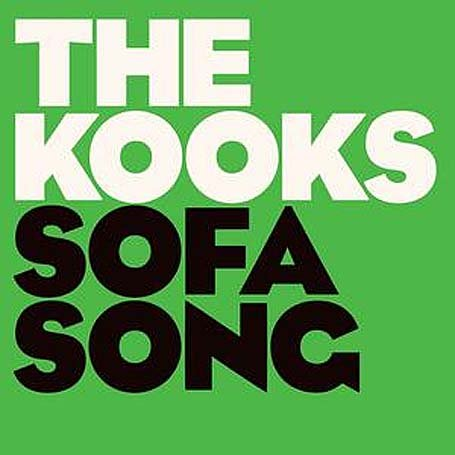

"Sofa Song" is a song by British rock band the Kooks and is featured on their debut studio album, Inside In/Inside Out (2006). It was released on 17 October 2005 as the second single from that album, charting at number 28 in the UK Singles Chart.

== Songwriting ==
Luke Pritchard stated in NME that Morrissey (of The Smiths) is one of his heroes and that "Sofa Song" was an attempt to write a song like Morrissey and Johnny Marr used to write during the Smiths' lifetime; a playful melody with a dark underbelly and lyrics.

== Track listings ==
- CD (VSCDT1904)
1. "Sofa Song" – 2:15
2. "Be Mine" – 2:35
- 7-inch (VS1904)
1. "Sofa Song" – 2:15
2. "Be Mine" - 2:35
3. "Something to Say" – 2:41
- DVD (VSDVD1904)
1. "Sofa Song" (video) – 2:21
2. "Eddie's Gun" (video) – 2:14
3. "Put Your Back to My Face"

== Charts ==
| Chart (2005) | Peak position |
|---|---|
| UK Singles (OCC) | 28 |

== Certifications ==
| Region | Certification | Certified units/sales |
|---|---|---|
| United Kingdom (BPI) | Silver | 200,000^{‡} |
^{‡} Sales+streaming figures based on certification alone.
