= Ooh La =

Single by the Kooks

from the album Inside In/Inside Out
- Released: 28 October 2006
- Recorded: 2005
- Genre: Indie rock
- Length: 3:30
- Label: Virgin
- Songwriters: Luke Pritchard, Hugh Harris, Max Rafferty and Paul Garred.

The Kooks singles chronology
"She Moves in Her Own Way" (2006)	"Ooh La" (2006)	"Pull Me In" (2007)

Alternative cover
- 7" vinyl front cover

Alternative cover
- CD maxi-single front cover

"Ooh La" is a song by British indie rock band the Kooks. It was the sixth single from their debut studio album Inside In/Inside Out and was released on 23 October 2006. The song is an alleged dedication to late model Audrey Lindvall. It was featured in the Torchwood episode "Small Worlds" and was an iTunes Single of the Week. A small segment is also featured in the Criminal Minds episode "True Night". The song also featured in an episode of American Idol and in the twentieth series of the pop quiz show Never Mind The Buzzcocks.

== Track listings ==
7-inch vinyl

1. "Ooh La" (radio version)
2. "Ask Me"

CD

1. "Ooh La"
2. "Sofa Song (Alternate Version)"

CD maxi-single

1. "Ooh La"
2. "I Don't Mind"
3. "Matchbox" (recorded live at The Lowlands Festival, the Netherlands, 2006)
4. "Ooh La" (video)

== Charts ==
Chart (2006)	Peak position
Ireland (IRMA)	38
Scotland Singles (OCC)	15
UK Singles (OCC)	20

== Certifications ==
Region	Certification	Certified units/sales
New Zealand (RMNZ)	Gold	15,000^{‡}
United Kingdom (BPI)	Gold	400,000^{‡}
^{‡} Sales+streaming figures based on certification alone.
