= She Moves in Her Own Way =

2006 single by the Kooks

Single by the Kooks

from the album Inside In / Inside Out
- B-side: "I Already Miss You"; "Do You Love Me Still?"; "In My Opinion"; "Give In"
- Released: 26 June 2006
- Genre: Britpop; indie rock
- Length: 2:49
- Label: Virgin
- Songwriters: Luke Pritchard; Hugh Harris; Max Rafferty; Paul Garred
- Producer: Tony Hoffer

The Kooks singles chronology
"Naïve" (2006)	"She Moves in Her Own Way" (2006)	"Ooh La" (2006)

Music video
- "She Moves in Her Own Way" on YouTube

"She Moves in Her Own Way" is a song by British band the Kooks from their debut studio album, Inside In / Inside Out (2006). It was released 26 June 2006 as the fifth single from that album, charting at number seven on the UK Singles Chart. The music video features the band in Tijuana, Mexico.

== Track listings ==
UK 7-inch single

A. "She Moves in Her Own Way"
B. "I Already Miss You"

UK CD1 and European CD single

1. "She Moves in Her Own Way"
2. "Do You Love Me Still?"

UK CD2

1. "She Moves in Her Own Way"
2. "In My Opinion"
3. "Give In"
4. "She Moves in Her Own Way" (video)

== Charts ==
=== Weekly charts ===
Chart (2006–2007)	Peak position
Belgium (Ultratop 50 Flanders)	29
Germany (GfK)	66
Ireland (IRMA)	11
Netherlands (Dutch Top 40)	35
Netherlands (Single Top 100)	55
New Zealand (Recorded Music NZ)	11
Portugal (AFP)	30
Scotland Singles (OCC)	7
UK Singles (OCC)	7
US Adult Alternative Airplay (Billboard)	9
US Adult Top 40 (Billboard)	39
US Modern Rock Tracks (Billboard)	39

=== Year-end charts ===
Chart (2006)	Position
UK Singles (OCC)	39

== Certifications ==
Region	Certification	Certified units/sales
United Kingdom (BPI)	5× Platinum	3,000,000^{‡}
^{‡} Sales+streaming figures based on certification alone.
