= Junk of the Heart =

Studio album by The Kooks
- Released: 9 September 2011
- Recorded: 2009–2011
- Length: 35:50
- Label: Virgin
- Producer: Tony Hoffer

The Kooks chronology
Konk (2008)	Junk of the Heart (2011)	Listen (2014)

Singles from Junk of the Heart
- 1. "Is It Me" Released: 4 September 2011 (UK only); 2. "Junk of the Heart (Happy)" Released: 6 November 2011; 3. "How'd You Like That" Released: 2012; 4. "Rosie" Released: 12 March 2012

Junk of the Heart is the third studio album from British indie band The Kooks. It was released in Europe on 9 September 2011, and in the United Kingdom on 12 September 2011 by Virgin Records. The first single, "Is It Me", was released on 4 September 2011 and the second single, "Junk of the Heart (Happy)" was released on 6 November 2011. This was the last album to feature original drummer Paul Garred.

== Writing and recording ==
In April 2009, The Kooks revealed to BBC's Newsbeat that they were working on their third studio album. Frontman Luke Pritchard told Newsbeat, "We kind of barricaded ourselves in the countryside for a few weeks—stayed at some friends' who have a cottage in Norfolk." By August 2010, initial recording sessions had been produced by Jim Abbiss (Arctic Monkeys, Kasabian, Adele), with songs such as "Weight of the World", "Winds of Change", "Window to the Soul", "Strange One", "Rainbow", "Carried Away" and "The Saboteur" in contention for the album. Pritchard stated that the band's sound had changed drastically with the presence of new bassist Peter Denton and drummer Chris Prendergast, both of whom had joined The Kooks during the Konk touring cycle.

However, after working on six songs with Abbiss, the band decided to part ways with the producer because "we felt that it wasn’t the right direction – we were going down a road we’d already gone down. We felt that we weren’t progressing," said Pritchard. After Pritchard voiced his concerns to Tony Hoffer, producer of the band's first two albums, Hoffer suggested that the band "needed to open new doors in terms of production and instrumentation." This inspired Pritchard to re-write and re-record the whole album with Hoffer as producer, after initial hesitation from the other band members who were concerned that working with Hoffer again would lead to repeating the sound of the first two albums.

The Hoffer sessions also saw the return of original drummer Paul Garred, who had previously left the band due to nerve damage in his left arm but had recovered sufficiently to be involved in the recording, if not the writing. "The way that we work is that we'll write and record together, but he doesn't feel comfortable on the road at the moment. But who knows in the future," said Pritchard regarding Garred's involvement with the band after the album's release. Prendergast resumed touring with the band leading up to the album's release in September 2011, while Garred was involved in promotional duties, including press photos, interviews, videos and live sessions. By October, Denny Weston Jr. – who played percussion during the album recording sessions – had replaced Prendergast as tour drummer and would retain the position until mid-2012, while Garred would leave the band permanently in November 2011. From summer 2012 to mid-2013, the remainder of the Junk of the Heart touring cycle would be completed with former Golden Silvers drummer Alexis Nunez, who would eventually become a full member of the band and be involved in their next studio album, Listen.

== Critical reception ==
Professional ratings
Aggregate scores
Source	Rating
Metacritic	54/100
Review scores
Source	Rating
AllMusic	2.5/5 stars
Drowned in Sound	5/10
The Guardian	3/5 stars
MusicOMH	3/5 stars
NME	2/5 stars
Paste	6/10
PopMatters	7/10
Spin	6/10 stars
Sputnikmusic	3.5/5 stars

Junk of the Heart was met with "mixed or average" reviews from critics. At Metacritic, which assigns a weighted average rating out of 100 to reviews from mainstream publications, this release received an average score of 54 based on 16 reviews. It also received mixed reactions from fans on its release. In a review for MusicOMH, critic reviewer Andrew Burgess wrote: "Here, Pritchard and company aim for an even more mainstream success than Konk, and they will likely succeed in selling a boatload of albums. But they've lost something in the process." Spin gave the album a 6/10, calling the tracks "both their best and blandest yet." Reviewer Barry Walters added, "The middle of the road was always their destiny, it seems, and they arrive with blatantly pleasant but character-free ditties."

At Sputnikmusic, the album was reviewed: "Junk of the Heart is an exciting change of pace from their original sound and a leap forward for the band as a whole. The tracklisting on this album is okay and, despite a minor hiccup, seems to flow very nicely."

== B-sides ==
"Is It Me"

- "Winds of Change" (The Magic Shop, NYC)
- "Outstanding" (demo)
- "Stormy Weather" (live in Hartlepool)

"Junk of the Heart"

- "Pumped Up Kicks" (BBC live version)
- "Eskimo Kiss" (acoustic live version)
- "Runaway" (acoustic live version)

== Track listing ==
No.	Title	Writer(s)	Length
1.	"Junk of the Heart (Happy)"	Luke Pritchard; Tony Hoffer	3:07
2.	"How'd You Like That"	Pritchard; Hugh Harris	3:14
3.	"Rosie"	Pritchard; Harris	3:10
4.	"Taking Pictures of You"	Pritchard	2:42
5.	"Fuck the World Off"	Pritchard	2:52
6.	"Time Above the Earth"	Pritchard; Harris	1:54
7.	"Runaway"	Pritchard; Hoffer	3:00
8.	"Is It Me"	Pritchard	3:30
9.	"Killing Me"	Pritchard; Harris	3:25
10.	"Petulia"	Pritchard	2:42
11.	"Eskimo Kiss"	Pritchard	3:34
12.	"Mr. Nice Guy"	Pritchard; Peter Denton	2:40

iTunes bonus tracks
No.	Title	Writer(s)	Length
13.	"Carried Away"	Pritchard; Hoffer	4:02
14.	"The Saboteur"	Pritchard	4:34

Amazon bonus track
No.	Title	Writer(s)	Length
13.	"Picture Frame"	Pritchard	3:02

Japanese limited edition bonus track
No.	Title	Writer(s)	Length
13.	"Good Times"	Pritchard	4:41

== Personnel ==
The Kooks

- Luke Pritchard – vocals, guitar, piano
- Hugh Harris – guitar, piano, string arrangements (tracks 6 and 7), backing vocals
- Peter Denton – bass guitar, backing vocals, piano, synths
- Paul Garred – drums

Additional personnel

- Tony Hoffer – production, programming, synths
- Cydney Robinson – backing vocals (track 3)
- Denny Weston Jr. – percussion (tracks 7 and 11)
- The Section Quartet – strings (tracks 6 and 7)
- Jim Abbiss – production (bonus tracks only)
- Chris Prendergast – drums (bonus tracks only)

== Charts ==
Chart (2011)	Peak position
Australian Albums (ARIA)	9
Austrian Albums (Ö3 Austria)	9
Belgian Albums (Ultratop Flanders)	16
Belgian Albums (Ultratop Wallonia)	28
Dutch Albums (Album Top 100)	6
French Albums (SNEP)	19
German Albums (Offizielle Top 100)	6
Irish Albums (IRMA)	41
Italian Albums (FIMI)	23
Mexican Albums (Top 100 Mexico)	66
New Zealand Albums (RMNZ)	30
Norwegian Albums (VG-lista)	27
Scottish Albums (Official Charts)	13
Spanish Albums (Promusicae)	25
Swiss Albums (Schweizer Hitparade)	8
UK Albums (Official Charts)	10
US Billboard 200	68
US Top Rock Albums (Billboard)	20
US Top Alternative Albums (Billboard)	11
