= Inside In / Inside Out =

Studio album by The Kooks
- Released: 23 January 2006
- Recorded: 2005
- Studio: Konk Studio, London
- Genre: Indie rock, post-punk revival, post-britpop
- Length: 40:51
- Label: Virgin
- Producer: Tony Hoffer

The Kooks chronology
Inside In / Inside Out (2006)	Konk (2008)

Singles from Inside In / Inside Out
- 1. "Eddie's Gun" Released: 11 July 2005; 2. "Sofa Song" Released: 17 October 2005; 3. "You Don't Love Me" Released: 9 January 2006; 4. "Naïve" Released: 27 March 2006; 5. "She Moves in Her Own Way" Released: 26 June 2006; 6. "Ooh La" Released: 23 October 2006

Professional ratings
Aggregate scores
Source	Rating
Metacritic	73/100
Review scores
Source	Rating
AllMusic	4/5 stars
Drowned in Sound	8/10
The Guardian	4/5 stars
NME	8/10
Pitchfork	5.9/10
PopMatters	7/10
Rolling Stone	2/5 stars
Spin	3.5/5 stars
Stylus Magazine	D
Uncut	6/10

Inside In / Inside Out is the debut studio album by British indie rock band The Kooks. It was released on 23 January 2006, on Virgin Records. It contains the singles "Eddie's Gun", "Sofa Song", "You Don't Love Me", "Naïve", "She Moves in Her Own Way", and "Ooh La". The album was produced by Tony Hoffer of record label Virgin Records. Reaching No. 2 in the UK Albums Chart, the album has sold over 2,000,000 copies worldwide since its release.

== Background ==
After they had signed to Virgin Records, The Kooks were reluctant to record an album right away, stating a desire to focus more on their live performances and songwriting. The band has said embarking on their first live tour instead of recording an album initially helped them develop their style and sound. As lead singer Luke Pritchard claimed, "We didn't sit down with a blueprint. We just naturally developed and we didn't try to shape or mould ourselves to anything." As a result, they went into the studio with hundreds of songs from a variety of genres, and it took an "incredible amount of patience" from producer Tony Hoffer to shape the content into what would become the record. Most of the album is written about Katie Melua, whom Pritchard dated while at the BRIT School.

Following their first tour supporting The Thrills, The Kooks recorded their debut album, Inside In/Inside Out, at Konk studios in London in 2005.

== Chart performance ==
Though media attention was dominated by the release of the Arctic Monkeys debut album Whatever People Say I Am, That's What I'm Not on the same day, Inside In/Inside Out recorded first week sales of 19,098 and entered the UK Albums Chart at number nine. It would eventually peak at number two for two weeks. It has since been certified 5× Platinum by the British Phonographic Industry (BPI) for sales of over 1,500,000.

In a later interview with NME, Pritchard thanked the Arctic Monkeys for "shielding" The Kooks from the press' scrutiny:

God bless the Arctic Monkeys because if it wasn't for them we wouldn't have been so shielded. We were so overshadowed by the success [of] it (their album) because it was so monster and we crept in behind everybody's back.

== 15th anniversary tour and reissue ==
To mark the 15th anniversary of Inside In/Inside Out, on 21 May 2021, The Kooks announced a January–February 2022 tour of the U.K. and Ireland in which the band's current line-up would perform the album in full. After the initial announcement, the band added more dates to the tour. Following the U.K. and Ireland dates, the band announced they were bringing the Inside In/Inside Out 15th anniversary shows to Australia in October 2022.

In addition to the tour, on 27 August 2021, The Kooks released a 15th Anniversary deluxe edition reissue of Inside In/Inside Out. Besides the album being remastered, it also included a bonus disc of alternate takes and demos, plus a booklet of liner notes containing interviews with all four original members of the band.

== Track listing ==
All tracks are written by Luke Pritchard, Hugh Harris, Max Rafferty and Paul Garred except where noted.

No.	Title	Writer(s)	Length
1.	"Seaside"	Pritchard; Garred	1:39
2.	"See the World"	Pritchard; Harris	2:38
3.	"Sofa Song"		2:13
4.	"Eddie's Gun"		2:13
5.	"Ooh La"		3:28
6.	"You Don't Love Me"		2:35
7.	"She Moves in Her Own Way"	Pritchard; Rafferty	2:49
8.	"Matchbox"	Pritchard; Rafferty	3:09
9.	"Naïve"		3:23
10.	"I Want You"		3:26
11.	"If Only"		2:01
12.	"Jackie Big Tits"		2:32
13.	"Time Awaits"	Pritchard; Rafferty	5:08
14.	"Got No Love"		3:37

US bonus track
No.	Title	Length
15.	"Do You Love Me Still?"	3:15

15th Anniversary Deluxe Edition Disc 2
No.	Title	Writer(s)	Length
1.	"Seaside" (Alternative Take)		1:52
2.	"Ooh La" (Alternative Take)		3:35
3.	"Tell Them from Me"	Pritchard	1:56
4.	"Sofa Song" (Original Studio Demo)		1:58
5.	"1984"	Pritchard	3:00
6.	"You Don't Love Me" (Acoustic Demo)		2:14
7.	"Constantine's Love" (Early Studio Demo)		2:38
8.	"Matchbox" (Original Studio Demo)		2:13
9.	"She Moves in Her Own Way" (Alternative Take)		3:11
10.	"In My Opinion"	Pritchard; Garred; Rafferty	2:32
11.	"Theory of a Pop Star" (Cassette Demo)	Garred	1:56
12.	"Naïve" (Alternative Take)		3:48
13.	"Inaudible Melodies"	Jack Johnson	1:20
14.	"Something to Say" (Original Studio Demo)	Pritchard; Garred; Rafferty	3:58

Acoustic edition

Also available is Inside In / Inside Out Acoustic, an acoustic version of the album recorded at live performances at Abbey Road Studios, London and Osaka, Japan, using acoustic guitars. The CD contains all of the songs from Inside In/Inside Out except "I Want You", "If Only", and "Got No Love". One song not on the original album, "California", is contained on this version, recorded live in Osaka. The edition is available as a CD from Virgin Records. The acoustic edition was also released as a bonus vinyl LP with the standard LP.

== Personnel ==
- Luke Pritchard, lead vocals, rhythm guitar
- Hugh Harris, lead guitar, backing vocals
- Max Rafferty, bass, backing vocals
- Paul Garred, drums

== Legacy ==
Kris Leonard of Viola Beach told Wonderland in January 2016 that Inside In/Inside Out was the first album he bought, at the age of nine. He credited the record with inspiring him to become a musician.

== Charts and certifications ==
=== Weekly charts ===
Chart (2006–2008)	Peak position
Australian Albums (ARIA)	84
Belgian Albums (Ultratop Flanders)	4
Belgian Albums (Ultratop Wallonia)	78
Dutch Albums (Album Top 100)	25
European Top 100 Albums (Billboard)	10
French Albums (SNEP)	107
German Albums (Offizielle Top 100)	75
Italian Albums (FIMI)	28
Irish Albums (IRMA)	3
New Zealand Albums (RMNZ)	24
Scottish Albums (OCC)	1
Swiss Albums (Schweizer Hitparade)	73
UK Albums (OCC)	2
US Billboard 200	165
US Digital Albums (Billboard)	165

Chart (2021)	Peak position
German Albums (Offizielle Top 100)	66

=== Year-end charts ===
Chart (2006)	Position
Belgian Albums (Ultratop Flanders)	12
UK Albums (OCC)	5
Chart (2007)	Position
Belgian Albums (Ultratop Flanders)	75
UK Albums (OCC)	97
Chart (2008)	Position
UK Albums (OCC)	191

=== Decade-end charts ===
Chart (2000–09)	Position
UK Albums (OCC)	74

=== Certifications ===
Region	Certification	Certified units/sales
Australia (ARIA)	Platinum	70,000^{^}
Belgium (BRMA)	Gold	25,000^{*}
Germany (BVMI)	Gold	100,000^{‡}
Ireland (IRMA)	2× Platinum	30,000^{^}
New Zealand (RMNZ)	Gold	7,500^{^}
United Kingdom (BPI)	5× Platinum	1,514,977
^{*} Sales figures based on certification alone.^{^} Shipments figures based on certification alone.^{‡} Sales+streaming figures based on certification alone.
