= Naïve (song) =

2006 single by the Kooks

Single by the Kooks

from the album Inside In/Inside Out
- B-side: "Tea and Biscuits"; "Hiding Low"
- Released: 27 March 2006
- Genre: Indie rock
- Length: 3:24
- Label: Virgin
- Songwriters: Paul Garred; Hugh Harris; Luke Pritchard; Max Rafferty
- Producer: Tony Hoffer

The Kooks singles chronology
"You Don't Love Me" (2006)	"Naïve" (2006)	"She Moves in Her Own Way" (2006)

"Naïve" is a song by British indie rock band the Kooks. It was released on 27 March 2006 as the fourth single from their debut studio album, Inside In/Inside Out (2006). "Naïve" charted at number five on the UK Singles Chart, becoming the UK's 19th-best-selling single of 2006 and earning a sextuple platinum certification from the British Phonographic Industry (BPI) in 2025. The song also reached number 15 in Flanders and New Zealand as well as number 22 on the US Billboard Modern Rock Tracks chart.

It placed at number 87 in Triple J's Hottest 100 of the Past 20 Years, being one of a few songs to debut in the countdown without having made a yearly list beforehand.

== Background ==
Lead singer Luke Pritchard wrote "Naive" when he was a teenager. As he told The Guardian: "[I wrote it] when I was 15 or 16 – before we had the band – but I didn't like it. I was quite a paranoid, unconfident kid and I had a relationship with someone who was getting into a world that I didn't understand. The song is about the fear of someone doing something bad to you. The lyrics are real in some ways, but I was too young to have actually experienced that situation, so it was more me projecting my teenage fears. I've found myself in that situation since – it's become something of a self-fulfilling prophecy."

Guitarist Hugh Harris revealed that the song was recorded in various different formats before the final mix. "There are versions of Naive in the vaults of Virgin Records that would make us die of embarrassment if we heard them now," he said. "We just couldn't get the guitars to syncopate with the dancier rhythm. We tried it as ska. We even tried it as reggae. Eventually, I found a two-note guitar part and we simplified the drums, then just went over and over it again. It was exhausting. I don't think the song really suited our band at the time, but it was huge."

== Music video ==
The official music video features Pritchard singing the song whilst walking around in the Nambucca nightclub on London's Holloway Road, reminiscing on memories of him and his girlfriend. Pritchard told The Guardian that the director funnelled his own experiences into the video, making it about infidelity.

== Track listings ==
UK 7-inch single

A. "Naïve"
B. "Tea and Biscuits"

UK limited-edition Minimax CD single

1. "Naïve"
2. "Hiding Low"

European CD single

1. "Naïve"
2. "I Love That Girl"
3. "Naïve" (video)
4. "You Don't Love Me" (live from Fopp tour video)

Australian CD single

1. "Naïve"
2. "Tea and Biscuits"
3. "I Love That Girl"

Seeb remix

1. "Naïve" (Seeb remix) – 3:08

== Charts ==
=== Weekly charts ===
Chart (2006–2007)	Peak position
Belgium (Ultratop 50 Flanders)	15
Italy (FIMI)	31
Netherlands (Dutch Top 40)	39
Netherlands (Single Top 100)	82
New Zealand (Recorded Music NZ)	15
Scotland Singles (OCC)	8
Switzerland Airplay (Schweizer Hitparade)	86
UK Singles (OCC)	5
US Modern Rock Tracks (Billboard)	22

=== Year-end charts ===
Chart (2006)	Position
UK Singles (OCC)	19

Chart (2024)	Position
UK Singles (OCC)	94

Chart (2025)	Position
UK Singles (OCC)	71

== Certifications ==
Region	Certification	Certified units/sales
Brazil (Pro-Música Brasil)	Platinum	60,000^{‡}
Germany (BVMI)	Gold	150,000^{‡}
Italy (FIMI)	Gold	25,000^{‡}
New Zealand (RMNZ)	6× Platinum	180,000^{‡}
Spain (Promusicae)	Gold	30,000^{‡}
United Kingdom (BPI)	6× Platinum	3,600,000^{‡}
^{‡} Sales+streaming figures based on certification alone.

== Release history ==
Region	Date	Format(s)	Label(s)	Ref.
United Kingdom	27 March 2006	CD	Virgin	
Australia	19 August 2006	CD	Virgin	

== Covers ==
- Lily Allen—for a live session on The Jo Whiley Show. Allen's version was featured on the soundtrack for the film Angus, Thongs and Perfect Snogging.
- Sugababes member Mutya Buena—as a B-side for her debut solo single "Real Girl".
- Amie J—for Aldo Vanucci Presents / Good Living Records

== In popular culture ==
"Naïve" was featured on the soundtrack for the film 17 Again (2009) and the One Tree Hill episode "Resolve", as well as on the show's third soundtrack, The Road Mix and the 2009 video game Lego Rock Band.

Actress Jodie Comer stated in a 2018 interview that "Naïve" was her favourite song as a teenager, and that she considered having the song's title tattooed across the back of her neck before realising it was a bad idea.
