= Listen (The Kooks album) =

Studio album by The Kooks
- Released: 8 September 2014
- Recorded: 2013
- Studios: Los Angeles and London
- Genres: Indie rock; indie pop; chamber pop; alternative rock; funk; gospel
- Length: 38:23
- Label: Virgin EMI
- Producer: Inflo

The Kooks chronology
Junk of the Heart (2011)	Listen (2014)	Hello, What's Your Name? (2015)

Singles from Listen
- 1. "Down" Released: 18 April 2014; 2. "Around Town" Released: 15 June 2014; 3. "Bad Habit" Released: 15 July 2014; 4. "Forgive & Forget" Released: 1 September 2014; 5. "See Me Now" Released: 22 December 2014

Listen is the fourth studio album by British rock band The Kooks. It was released on 8 September 2014 through Universal. It is the band's first album to feature new drummer Alexis Nunez who joined in 2012, replacing Paul Garred. The album was preceded by singles "Down", "Around Town", "Bad Habit" and "Forgive & Forget".

Stylistically, the album differs from the band's previous work as elements of jazz, gospel, and R&B were added into the music. This album also marks the first time Tony Hoffer did not produce the band's work. Instead production was handled by Inflo with the band's lead singer and main songwriter Luke Pritchard as co-producer.

Listen was the band's first album in three years, with Junk of the Heart being released in September 2011. The album was recorded in Los Angeles and London.

Upon its release, Listen debuted at No. 16 on the UK Albums Chart and failed to meet the commercial expectations set forth by the band's previous work.

== Recording ==
The album started to take shape after frontman Luke Pritchard wrote "Around Town" without being sure if it was meant to be for the band. According to Pritchard, "It was like a catalyst. I didn't know if it was going to be a Kooks [song] or if it was going to be a side thing, because it seemed so different. It was like electric church music. I'd written that before I'd even met Inflo, and then he heard it and said, ‘Okay, we can cross-pollinate here musically’. Everything stemmed from it."

Pritchard met Inflo, a 25-year-old London-based producer via Soundcloud. "I had written 'Around Town' and I thought maybe for the beat I might want to bring in someone from hip hop," said Pritchard. The two artists were both looking to work with someone new and "looking to get out of the bullshit" of the music industry. "Forgive and Forget" was the first song they wrote together. Pritchard has described Inflo as "a young Quincy Jones."

"With this record we didn't do any rehearsing beforehand. I'd write a song with Inflo or on my own, put it up and we'd all play over it. There was a real freedom to the process," said Pritchard regarding the recording process. "To me this album is about pure expression. Even the way we made the album felt fresh. Rather than us just being a band in a room, playing our guitars with the vocal over the top, which is what we'd always done before, we were really listening to what was going on around us, picking up ideas. The whole thing was much more natural."

The results were considerably different from the band's previous three albums, to the point where they considered changing their name. According to Pritchard, "We could have renamed the band, it felt that different [...] The first three albums were chapter one, this album is the first of chapter two.

== Themes ==
Pritchard has explained that "Westside" is a track about his two best friends getting married and "Forgive and Forget" is a story of a couple breaking up in a bar. The track "It Was London" is a song about the London Riots; "A big city like that, London, Paris, you have this illusion that everything's safe, and that sort of thing happens and the walls come crashing down. The police brutality that happened around that time… we wrote a song about that," Pritchard stated. Pritchard has said that "It Was London" is one of his favorite songs on the album.

The song "See Me Now" is a letter to Luke's dad that took on the form of a song. "My dad passed away when I was really young. That's it really, it's a ballad. It's hard to do but I'm glad I did. I got pushed into it by Inflo really. We'd been talking about it all day and I was telling him about my dad and he just said you should write a letter to him. And I didn't really want to because it's a bit cheesy, but from there... the song came of it. I think it's really beautiful. I dunno why at that point I decided to let that happen," Pritchard said in an interview.

== Promotion ==
The lead single to promote the album, Down, was released digitally on 18 April 2014 and as a 7" vinyl on 21 April 2014. The album's second single, Around Town, was released on 15 June 2014. Their song, Around Town also featured in the video game, FIFA 15. Bad Habit impacted US modern rock radio on 15 July 2014 as the third single.

To support the release, the band embarked on a four-date UK tour in May 2014.

== Critical reception ==
Professional ratings
Aggregate scores
Source	Rating
Metacritic	60/100
Review scores
Source	Rating
AllMusic	3.5/5 stars
Digital Spy	2.5/5 stars
Drowned in Sound	(2/10)
The Independent	4/5 stars
NME	(5/10)
The Daily Telegraph	4/5 stars
The Guardian	3/5 stars
The Observer	2/5 stars

Upon its release, Listen garnered mixed reviews. At Metacritic, a website which assigns a rating out of 100 from reviews by mainstream critics, it currently holds a score of 60 based on 12 reviews, indicating "mixed or average reviews". The Telegraph gave the album 4 stars out of 5, stating that "the Kooks have come out fighting though, completely re-evaluating and overhauling their sound and the result is an exuberant fourth album bristling with character." The Independent commended lead singer Luke Pritchard's ability to search for new musical directions and also gave the album 4 out of 5 stars. In a somewhat mixed review of the album, The Guardian gave it 3 out of 5 stars, commenting that the new album is "shamelessly retro, but enjoyable pop-rock".

== Track listing ==
Standard edition
No.	Title	Writer(s)	Producer(s)	Length
1.	"Around Town"	Luke Pritchard; Inflo	Inflo	4:10
2.	"Forgive & Forget"	Pritchard; Inflo; Alexis Nuñez	Inflo	3:57
3.	"Westside"	Pritchard; Inflo; Hugh Harris	Inflo	3:30
4.	"See Me Now"	Pritchard; Inflo	Inflo	3:01
5.	"It Was London"	Pritchard; Inflo	Inflo	3:13
6.	"Bad Habit"	Pritchard; Inflo; Peter Denton	Inflo	3:40
7.	"Down"	Pritchard; Inflo	Inflo	2:41
8.	"Dreams"	Pritchard; Inflo	Inflo	3:00
9.	"Are We Electric"	Pritchard; Fraser T Smith	Smith	4:06
10.	"Sunrise"	Pritchard; Inflo	Inflo	3:14
11.	"Sweet Emotion"	Pritchard; Inflo	Inflo	5:11

Deluxe edition
No.	Title	Writer(s)	Producer(s)	Length
12.	"Murderer"	Pritchard; Inflo	Inflo	3:45
13.	"Icons"	Pritchard; Smith	Smith	3:43
14.	"Keep Your Head Up"	Pritchard; Inflo	Inflo	3:29
15.	"Backstabber"	Pritchard; Inflo	Inflo	4:07
16.	"Down" (Music Video)

== Personnel ==
The Kooks

- Luke Pritchard – vocals, guitar, co-production, programming (track 1), synths (track 2), tambourine (track 6), bass (tracks 8, 9 and 12), hand claps (track 10), keyboards (track 13)
- Hugh Harris – guitar (tracks 1, 3, 5, 10 and 15), backing vocals (tracks 2, 6)
- Peter Denton – bass (except tracks 8, 9, 12 and 13), guitar (track 6), percussion (track 10)
- Alexis Nunez – drums (except track 8), percussion (tracks 1, 2, 5, 7, 9, 10 and 13), bass (track 2)

Additional personnel

- Inflo – production (except tracks 9 and 13), percussion (tracks 1, 2, 5, 7 and 10), synths (tracks 1, 3 and 8), programming (tracks 1, 2, 3, 8, 10 and 11), piano (tracks 4 and 14), guitar (track 12), organ (track 15)
- Fraser T Smith – production (tracks 9 and 13), keyboards (tracks 9 and 13), guitar (tracks 9 and 13), drum programming (tracks 9 and 13)
- Behind the Force Choir - choir (tracks 1, 4, 6 and 15)
- Carmen Phelan - violin and viola (tracks 4 and 15)
- Cleo Nikolic - backing vocals (tracks 4, 10, 11 and 14)
- Betty Thorpe - crowd vocals (track 6)
- Kate Fletcher - crowd vocals (track 6)
- Tommy Antonio - Rhodes (track 15)
- Erica Earl - additional vocals (track 15)

== Charts ==
Chart (2014)	Peak position
Australian Albums (ARIA)	15
Austrian Albums (Ö3 Austria)	23
Belgian Albums (Ultratop Flanders)	25
Belgian Albums (Ultratop Wallonia)	55
Dutch Albums (Album Top 100)	51
French Albums (SNEP)	79
Irish Albums (IRMA)	51
German Albums (Offizielle Top 100)	19
Scottish Albums (Official Charts)	22
Swiss Albums (Schweizer Hitparade)	16
UK Albums (Official Charts)	16
US Billboard 200	85
US Top Rock Albums (Billboard)	32
US Top Alternative Albums (Billboard)	21
