= Brandon Friesen =

American music producer, audio engineer, mixer, and television producer

- Born: Minneapolis, Minnesota, United States
- Occupations: Music producer, audio engineer, mixer, television producer
- Labels: Blue Cadillac Music; Arbor Television; C12 Records
- Website: www.brandonfriesen.com

Brandon Friesen is an American music producer, audio engineer, mixer, and television producer. Born in Minneapolis, Minnesota, he spent several years living and working in Canada before relocating permanently to Los Angeles, California. His companies include record label Blue Cadillac Music with partner Billy Ray Cyrus, Arbor Television, and C12 Records (distributed by EMI Music Canada).

Friesen developed Arbor Television, a TV production company with offices in Hollywood and Canada, in 2007. The music/comedy variety series Arbor Live, produced by Arbor Television, has run for 3 seasons and featured artists such as Mötley Crüe, Buckcherry, The Stray Cats, Velvet Revolver, Fishbone, Staind, Slayer, Mother Mother, Joe Satriani, Papa Roach, and Comeback Kid. Further, Friesen co-produced the reality show LAX broadcast on Viva, MTV, Nickelodeon, and Pro7 in Europe. Arbor Television produced European network Bravo's "The Best of Bravo" in 2010, which featured appearances by celebrities such as Justin Bieber, Miley Cyrus, Kesha, Zac Efron, Taylor Lautner, and Selena Gomez.

Friesen founded Arbor Records in 1999. It was distributed by EMI Music Canada, Allegro Music Corporation, and other distributors around the world and among Applaud Magazine's Canada's Top Ten Most Influential Independent Record Labels in 2004. Friesen sold this company in 2012 to Redsmoke Records. He maintains C12 Records, a Canadian rock label distributed by EMI Music Canada, and founded Blue Cadillac Music with Billy Ray Cyrus in 2012.

Friesen has been nominated for Grammy Awards and won Juno Awards. In 2006, he was honored for a second time as Engineer of the Year at the WCMA Awards. He engineered and mixed the Power97 sessions, which include acoustic performances by Nickelback, Sum 41, Everlast, Seether, Staind, Finger Eleven, and Three Days Grace.

== Discography ==
- 54-40 Ocean Pearl - Power Sessions SonyBMG (Note: Engineered) (Note: Mixed)
- All Man Kind All Man Kind (Indie)
- Atlantis Awaits (Universal) (Note: Produced)
- Bif Naked Love Myself Today - Power Sessions (Universal)
- Billy Ray Cyrus Change My Mind (Blue Cadillac Music)
- Billy Talent This is how it goes - Power Sessions (Atlantic)
- Brave New World Our Dystopian Lives (TIB)
- Chantal Kreviazuk A Man Needs A Maid - Neil Young Tribute (Sony/BMG)
- Collective Soul Shine - Power Sessions (El Music)
- ComeBack Kid Through The Noise (Victory)
- ComeBack Kid Broadcasting (Victory)
- Cranston Foundation Communicate (Indie)
- Danko Jones The Sound of Love - Power Sessions (Aquarius)
- Derek Miller Music Is The Medicine (Arbor)/EMI
- Derek Miller The Dirty Looks (Arbor)/EMI
- Domenica The Luxury feat. Marcos Curiel (P.O.D) (C12/EMI, Rodeostar/Sony, Spinning Inc.) (Note: Cowrote)
- Domenica The Better In Us All (C12/EMI, Rodeostar/Sony, Spinning Inc.)
- Dreadnaut A Taste of What's To Come (PHD)
- Euphoria Audio (Indie)
- Everlast What It's Like, Broken - Power Sessions (Island)
- Finger Eleven One Thing - Power Sessions (Wind-Up)
- Floor Thirteen Mmmm! (C12/EMI)
- Forty Foot Echo Save Me - Power Sessions (Hollywood)
- Jeff Healey Band While My Guitar..featuring George Harrison, Geoff Lynn (EMI)
- Jet Set Satellite Vegas (Fusion 3)KO
- Kapaches Suntan In Hell (Atlantic)
- Lives of Many Until We Lay This To Rest (PHD)
- Lives of Many The Sweet Art of Deceiving (PHD)
- Nickelback Leader of Men, How You Remind Me - Power 97 Sessions (Roadrunner)
- Paper Moon One Thousand Reasons to Stay (Endearing)
- Paper Moon Broken Hearts Break Faster Everyday (Endearing)
- Port Amoral Villans (Roadrunner)
- Powderfinger Sunsets - Power Sessions (Polydor/Universal)
- Projektor Red Wolf Glass (Endearing)
- Projektor Young Hearts Fail (Endearing)
- Rob Reynolds Coming Home (IHM/Universal)I
- Seether Fine, Driven Under - Power Sessions (Wind-Up)
- Staind Outside - Power Sessions (Atlantic)
- Steeple Chaser Standing of the Verge (C12/EMI)
- Stevie Salas Be What It Is (Sony Japan)
- Stoic Frame Justicia (Navarre/Universal)
- Stone Sour Come What May (Roadrunner)
- Sum 41 Over My Head - Power Sessions (Island)
- Sylvie An Electric Trace (Smallman/Warner)
- Sylvie Trees and Shade Are Our Only Fences (Smallman/Warner)
- Syndicate Syndicate (Sony Music)
- The Harlots Crawl Spaces (Universal)
- The Harlots Connoisseur of Ruin (Universal)
- The Music The People - Power Sessions (Capital)
- The Red Paintings The Revolution is Never Coming (Indie)
- The Screaming Jets Do Ya (Sony/BMG Australia)
- The Tea Party Messenger - Power Sessions (EMI)
- The Trews Not Ready to Go - Power Sessions (SonyBMG)
- The Watchmen Holiday - Power Sessions (EMI)
- Three Days Grace Wake Up - Power Sessions (Jive)
- Tinfoil Phoenix Living In The Shadow of the Bat Roadrunner
- Tinfoil Phoenix Age of Vipers (C4/Koch)
- Waking Eyes Taking The Hard Way - Power Sessions (Warner)
