= The Kooks =

English indie rock band

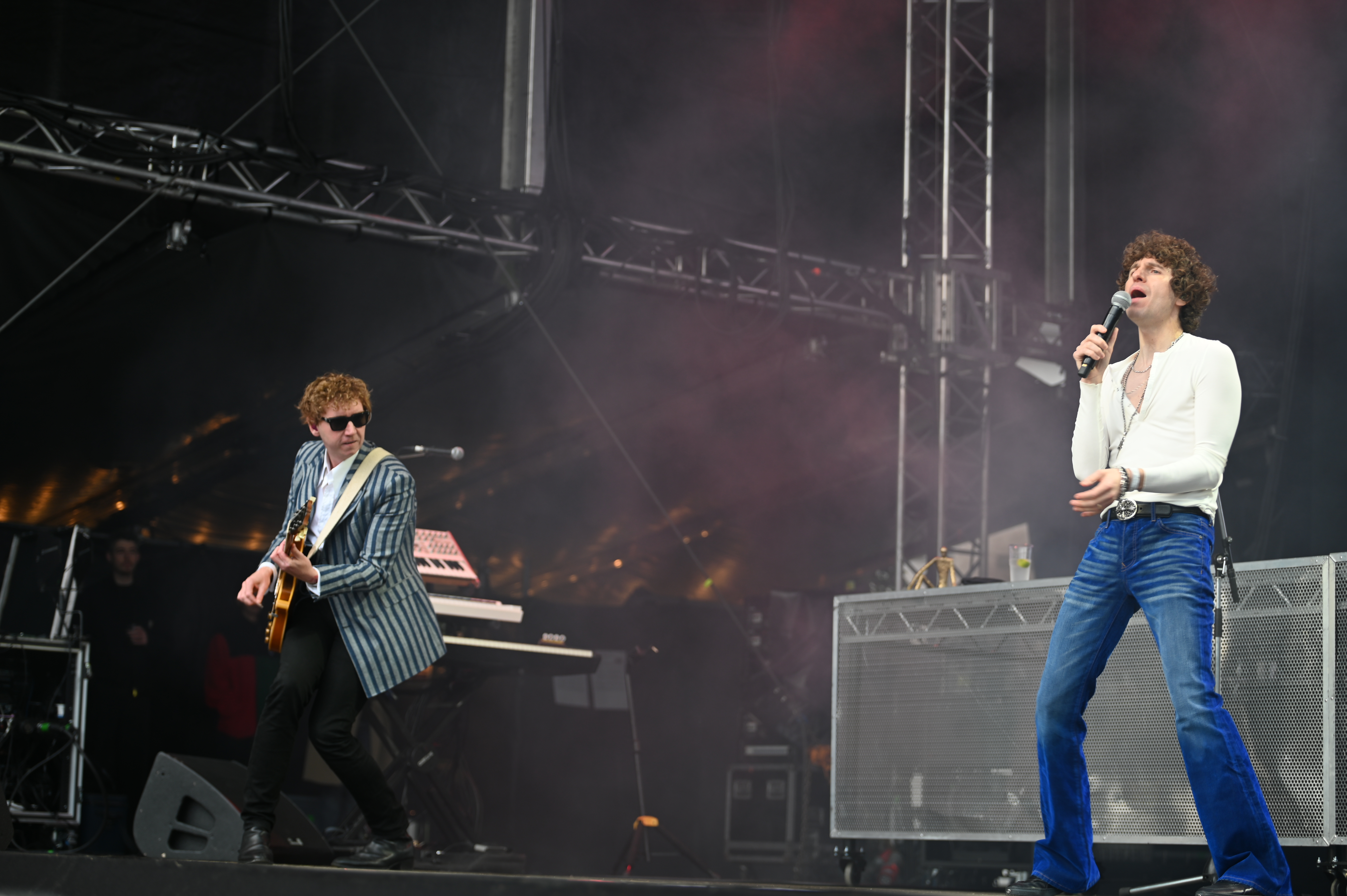
- The Kooks performing at 2026 Bergenfest

Background information
- Origin: Brighton, England
- Genres: Indie pop; pop rock; indie rock
- Years active: 2004–present
- Labels: Virgin, EMI
- Members: Luke Pritchard; Hugh Harris; Alexis Nuñez
- Past members: Peter Denton; Max Rafferty; Paul Garred
- Website: thekooks.com

The Kooks (/kuːks/, rhymes with 'flukes') are an English indie rock band formed in 2004 in Brighton. The current lineup consists of Luke Pritchard (vocals, guitar), Hugh Harris (bass, guitar, synthesizer), and Alexis Nuñez (drums, percussion).

Their music is primarily influenced by the 1960s British Invasion movement and post-punk revival of the new millennium. The Kooks have experimented in several genres including rock, Britpop, pop, reggae, ska, and more recently, funk and hip-hop, being described once as a "more energetic Thrills or a looser Sam Roberts Band, maybe even a less severe Arctic Monkeys at times".

After securing a deal with Virgin Records merely three months after forming, The Kooks achieved instant mainstream success following the release of their critically acclaimed 2006 debut album Inside In/Inside Out. The album is certified five-times platinum by the British Phonographic Industry (BPI), platinum certified by Australian Recording Industry Association (ARIA), and two times platinum by Irish Recorded Music Association (IRMA). Further success followed, with the Kooks winning Best UK & Ireland Act at the MTV Europe Music Awards 2006 and receiving a nomination at The Brit Awards for the single "She Moves in Her Own Way".

Their 2008 follow-up Konk debuted at number one on the UK Albums Chart, recording first week sales of 65,000 and achieving gold status in both the UK and Ireland. They have since released five studio albums, with their most recent, 2025's Never/Know, reaching number five on the UK chart.

== History ==
=== Formation and early years (2002–2004) ===
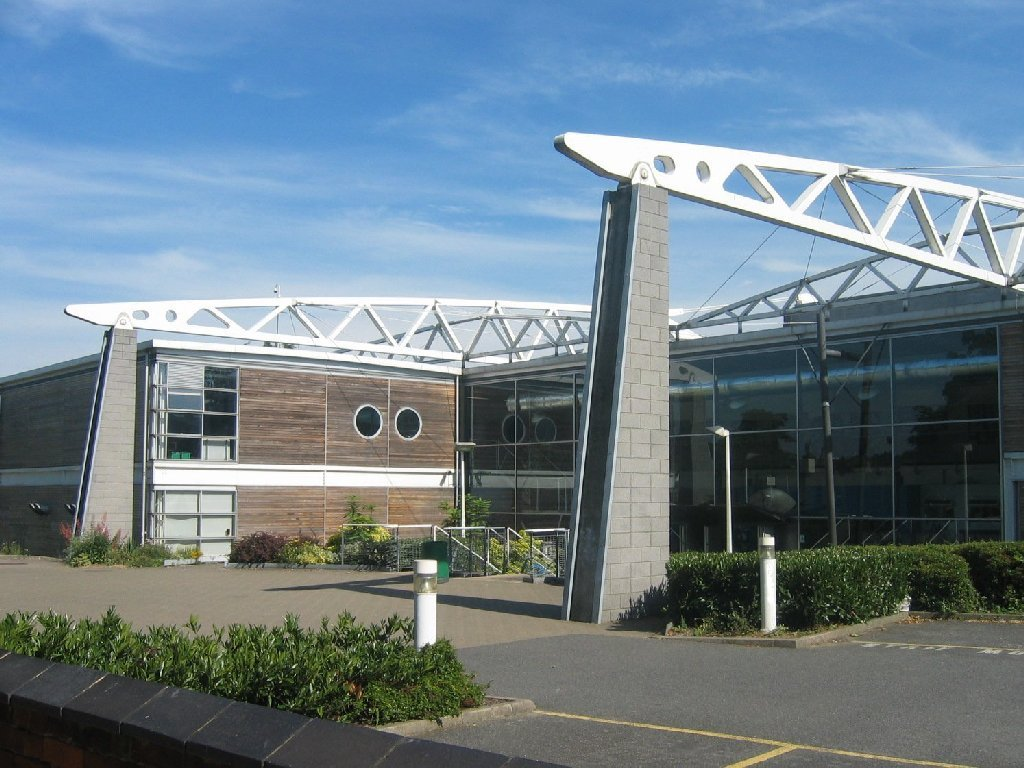
Garred, Pritchard and Harris met at the BRIT School.

The three members – Garred, Pritchard and Harris – of the Kooks all met as students at the BRIT School in Croydon, all three moving further south to join BIMM British and Irish Modern Music Institute (BIMM), where they met Rafferty – who was from Bridgnorth – in 2002. The inspiration to form a band came to Pritchard as he and Garred were out shopping for clothes one day in Primark as a joke. Speaking to MTV Garred said, "we had a vision on how we wanted the band to look and stuff—so we bought some clothes and these hats, it was fun." Sharing a love of the Rolling Stones, Bob Dylan, the Police and David Bowie, Pritchard got Harris and Rafferty involved under the guise of a school music project. Pritchard himself said "We got together just on a whim, really." With a strong demo of their material Garred and Pritchard went in search of a gig, and according to Garred, they were able to book their first show simply because the landlord liked their hats. "So we went in to get a gig, we don't have a demo blid burnt, and this guy told us, 'Well, you can't get a gig if you don't have a demo, but I like your hats, so I'm going to give you a gig'", said Garred. However, the band was unable to make the performance as they were finishing off their demo at the time.

Taking their name from the David Bowie song with the same title, Pritchard said the first song they played as a group was a cover version of the Strokes' "Reptilia". The Kooks recorded an EP demo, sending it out in search of gigs; they instead received offers from managers and record companies. The band had only been together as a group for four months when they signed with Virgin Records, after being spotted by several label scouts at the Brighton Free Butt Festival in 2005. In an interview with musicOMH, Pritchard revealed "It was really quick how it all happened, we did a demo with a mate of ours in London, which we sent off to one guy to get some gigs, and he turned out to be a manager. He rung us up and it kind of went from there." The members of the band have since revealed that they felt they weren't ready at the time, "We were way too early to sign a record deal ... We were really young, we'd been together like two or three months, so we really didn't want to sign. But then we thought it's a really good opportunity and Virgin seemed like really cool people – they just seemed to really understand where we were coming from", said Pritchard, who has also complimented the space the record label allowed for the band to grow: "They were patient with us and let us develop our style, whatever it was."

=== Inside In/Inside Out (2005–2007) ===
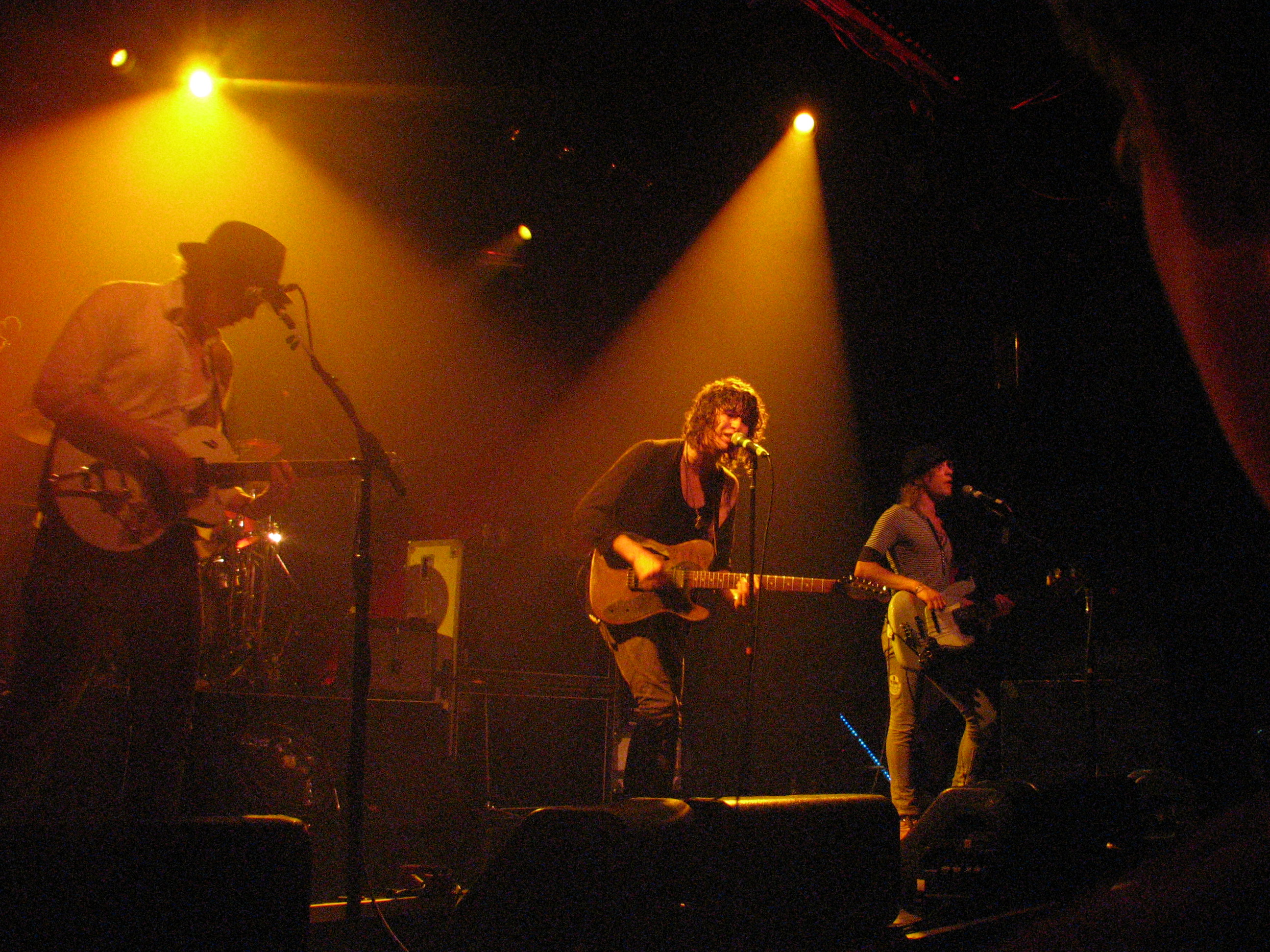
The Kooks at Irving Plaza, 11 May 2007

After they had signed to Virgin Records, the Kooks were reluctant to record an album straight away, stating a desire to focus more on their live performances and songwriting. The band has said embarking on their first live tour instead of recording an album initially helped them develop their style and sound. As Pritchard claimed, "We didn’t sit down with a blueprint. We just naturally developed and we didn’t try to shape or mould ourselves to anything." As a result, they went into the studio with hundreds of songs from a variety of genres, and it took an "incredible amount of patience" from producer Tony Hoffer to shape the content into what would become the record.

Following their first tour supporting the Thrills, the Kooks recorded their debut album, Inside In/Inside Out, at Konk studios in London in 2005. Though media attention was dominated by the release of the Arctic Monkeys debut album Whatever People Say I Am, That's What I'm Not on the same day, Inside In/Inside Out recorded first week sales of 19,098. Later, speaking to NME, Pritchard thanked the Arctic Monkeys for "shielding" The Kooks from the press' scrutiny. "God bless the Arctic Monkeys because if it wasn't for them we wouldn't have been so shielded. We were so overshadowed by the success of Whatever People Say I Am, That's What I'm Not because it was so monster and we crept in behind everybody's back." Entering the UK Albums Chart at number nine, it would eventually peak at number 2 for two weeks. Singles "Eddie's Gun", "Sofa Song", "You Don't Love Me", "Naïve", "She Moves in Her Own Way" and "Ooh La" achieved chart success in the UK and Europe, while "Naïve" and "She Moves in Her Own Way" put The Kooks in the top ten for the first time.

Kev Kharas, in his review for Drowned in Sound, viewed the Kooks as "a less irreverent and more melodic Art Brut, swapping that band's caustic wit for a far nicer type of honesty." Kharas also noted traces of "emo" in the band's style. AllMusic's Tim Sendra noted that the band's direction was "heavily indebted to classic rock", in particular Thin Lizzy and the Dexys, ultimately though Sendra felt "the band sounds like the Kooks and no one else". Calling the Kooks "an important reminder that there are just as many mediocre bands in the UK as there are in the United States" reviewer Jenny Eliscu of Rolling Stone claimed the album was "utterly forgettable, shoddily produced retro rock that at its worst sounds like a Brighton-accented version of the Spin Doctors". Brian Belardi of Prefix gave a positive review, describing Inside In/Inside Out as "An almost-perfect blend of '60s-style Britpop, '90s-style Britpop, and the post-punk of the new millennium".

The album went on to be certified quadruple platinum in the UK by the British Phonographic Industry (BPI) within a year and certified platinum across Europe by the International Federation of the Phonographic Industry (IFPI). The success of their debut album brought the band into mainstream media attention, winning the award for best UK and Ireland act at the MTV Awards in 2006 and picking up a Brit Awards nomination for "She Moves in Her Own Way", in 2007.

=== Rafferty's departure and Konk (2008) ===
Rafferty was fired from the band on 31 January 2008, after a series of absences due to illness and long-standing rumours about his place in the band; drug addiction was also quoted as one of the reasons for his departure. Rafferty subsequently refuted these claims, saying that he had been fired from the band because he "didn't think Konk was very good, and I said that." Dan Logan, bassist with a local Brighton band Cat the Dog, was drafted in as a temporary replacement for Rafferty. After the departure of Rafferty, the band had considered splitting up. Pritchard discussed the possibility of Dan Logan joining the band as their new bassist, "It's been really strange for us but it's something that had to happen. Dan hasn’t joined the band properly yet. We're trying him out, but I love playing with him." In October 2008, Peter Denton - who had previously filled in for Rafferty during the Inside In/Inside Out touring cycle - was chosen as the permanent bassist.

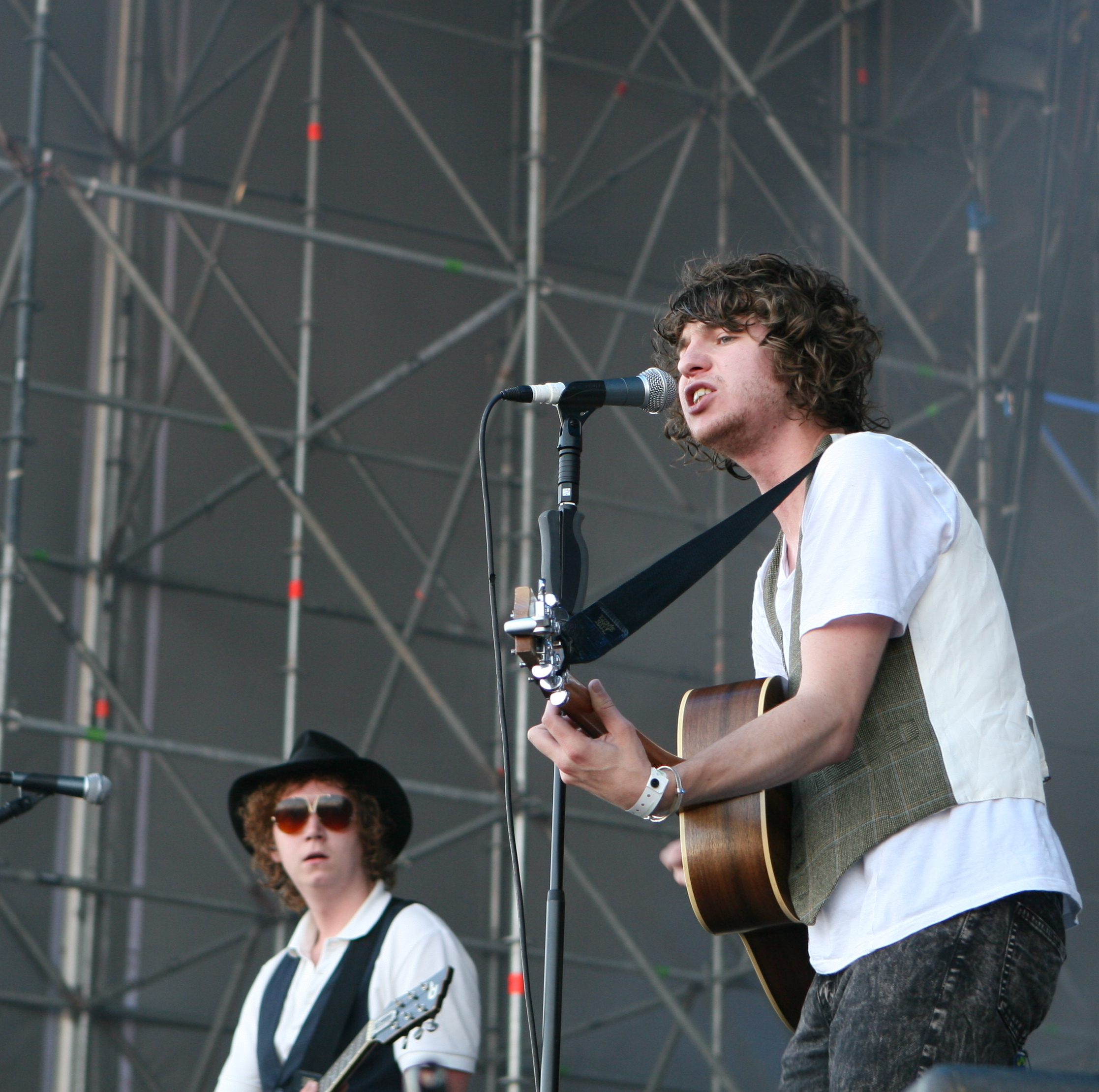
Harris and Pritchard at Summercase 2008 in Barcelona

The Kooks released their second studio album, Konk , on 14 April 2008. The record was named after the studio where it was recorded and produced by Tony Hoffer, who worked on the band's previous album, Inside In/Inside Out. Prior to releasing the album, in an interview with NME, lead singer Luke Pritchard had claimed to have 80-90 songs written for the album, stating, "I want this album to be big……I've got an ego, I want the album to do well. I want our singles to come on the radio and for people to literally have their heads blown off by them". Recorded over a total of seven weeks in London and Los Angeles Pritchard told NME the band had wanted more input into their second album. "Tony's a genius, but this time we wanted more involvement in the production," said Pritchard.

Konk debuted at No. 1 on the UK Albums Chart with first week sales of 65,901 units. The album spawned three top 50 hits including their highest chart performer to date, "Always Where I Need to Be", which peaked at No. 3 on the UK Singles Chart. In the US it reached No. 41 on the Billboard 200 and No. 22 on the Alternative Songs chart. The album was certified gold in both the UK and Ireland. A second limited edition two disc version of Konk entitled RAK was also released. The name was taken from the London studio where The Kooks recorded seven new live tracks along with the Arctic Monkeys and Mike Crossey, producer for The Zutons.

Allmusic said with Konk, The Kooks "explores pop and rock in all their glory," while BBC Music described their second album as "a little contrived with the recycling of old guitar lines and intros." NME suggested the departure of Rafferty affected Konk's production, stating "Konk is the sound of a band in disarray, unsuccessfully attempting to hold things together."

=== Junk of the Heart (2009–2013) ===
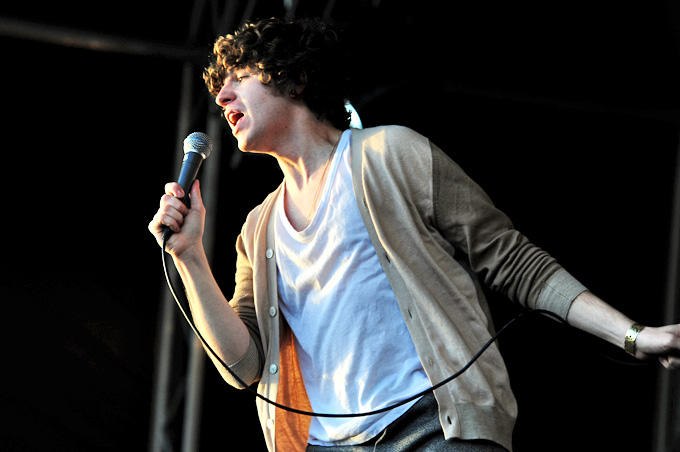
Performing at Southbound, January 2012

In April 2009, the Kooks revealed to BBC's Newsbeat that they were working on their third studio album. The band's drummer, Paul Garred left the band in late 2009 due to a nerve problem in his arm. He was temporarily replaced by Nicholas Millard, from the band Crackout, and then Chris Prendergast for live shows. However, Garred returned for the recording sessions in late 2010, while continuing to not tour with the band, as Pritchard recently stated his injury "turned more into a psychological thing" whereby he "feels uncomfortable playing for long periods of time" for fear of his arm "flaring up". One of the band's first main attempts at writing for this album together took place away from their usual surroundings, as frontman Luke Pritchard told Newsbeat, "We kind of barricaded ourselves in the countryside for a few weeks—stayed at some friend's who have a cottage in Norfolk." However, the band recently revealed that over two weeks there, the band only managed to make one new song: "Eskimo Kiss". After hiring and firing new producer Jim Abbiss (Arctic Monkeys, Kasabian, Adele) despite having some "really good sessions together", the band returned to previous producer Tony Hoffer who gave them a "new direction" and they recorded the album in a more contemporary style.

In January 2011, Pritchard announced that they had recorded fourteen new tracks. The band announced via social media that they had finished the new album on 30 March, which was eventually announced as Junk of the Heart. The first single taken from the album was "Is It Me" for Europe and "Junk of the Heart" elsewhere. The album was released in Europe on 9 September 2011 and in the U.K. on 12 September. Garred appeared in the promotional videos for "Is It Me" and "Junk of the Heart", and performed with the band in live sessions for Live from Abbey Road and Live Lounge. But for 2011 shows in the months prior to the album's release, Prendergast was still on drums, and when the band went on tour in October, they brought in session drummer Denny Weston who continued until mid-2012. Garred finally left the band in November, with Alexis Nunez (formerly of Golden Silvers) joining in mid-2012 as The Kooks' new touring drummer before eventually becoming a full member.

=== Listen (2014–2016) ===
On 20 April 2014, they released a new single titled "Down". Their new album, Listen, was released on 8 September 2014. According to reports, singer Luke Pritchard and 25-year-old London-based hip hop producer Inflo share co-producing credits. This is their first album with new drummer Alexis Nunez. In an interview in July 2014, Pritchard stated that Listen includes more improvisation and found that “that kind of fearlessness when you make the first album kind of crept back in.” Upon its release, the album debuted at No. 16 on the UK Albums Chart, then fell to No. 57 the week after, and the next week dropped off the chart. A remix album for Listen, entitled Hello, What's Your Name?, was released on 4 December 2015. It features remixes by Jack Beats, The Nextmen, Montmartre and Kove among others. The critical reception towards the album was mixed, but some of the reviews rated it as a "total fail both commercially and musically".

During the band's North America tour in mid-2015, Denton took two weeks of paternity leave to attend to the birth of his second son; Denny Weston, who was the Kooks' tour drummer prior to Nunez joining, filled in on bass.

=== The Best of... So Far (2017) ===
On 21 November 2016, the Kooks announced a 'Best Of' UK Tour to take place in April and May 2017 to mark their tenth anniversary as a band, in which they were planning to perform hits, b-sides and brand new music. To coincide with the tour, on 31 March 2017 the band announced the upcoming release of The Best of... So Far, as well as releasing "Be Who You Are", one of two new songs included on the compilation. Pritchard stressed that this compilation and tour did not signal the end of the band, stating, "It's been the greatest pleasure to work, travel, fight, hate and love the best and most talented people I've met in my life. It's the greatest job in the world and we don't intend to stop any time soon."

The two new tracks were produced by Brandon Friesen, who had also been overseeing sessions for the band's next studio album. Consisting of songs written by Pritchard while the other band members spent time with their families, the new album is deemed to be more of a band effort, as opposed to Listen which was constructed individually. "This one’s very much 'us' – all rehearsing songs, all arranging songs, all playing together. It’s got the same sort of energy that we had on our first couple of albums, which we were probably running away from a little bit for a while, but now we’ve gone back to it," said Pritchard. "Brandon Friesen, our producer, has taken more of a production role than me, so I won’t be taking the credit. On Listen, me and Inflo worked together everyday. But this one’s been much more of a band record. It’s been far more collaborative."

On 8 April 2017, the Kooks decided to start the tour with two warm up shows in their spiritual home of Brighton, a matinee gig at The Prince Albert pub and The Haunt in the evening; both these sold out within two hours on the day of the gig. They subsequently performed at the Isle of Wight Festival 2017.

=== Let's Go Sunshine (2018) ===
On 16 May 2018, The Kooks announced that their upcoming fifth studio album will be released on 31 August 2018. They also shared two new songs called ‘No Pressure’ and ‘All the Time’, which were played by them earlier this year during The Best Of Tour in South America. Several songs including ’No Pressure,’ ’All the Time,’ and ’Fractured and Dazed’ were released prior to the release of the full album.

On 4 September, the band announced a U.S. tour to take place in November. On 30 October, the band announced that the U.S. tour had to be rescheduled for early 2019 due to "unforeseen circumstances." When the band resumed performing at the Corona Capital festival in Mexico on 17 November 2018, Pete Denton was absent, with Peter Randall - who had previously played bass for Adele - in his place. Denton was also missing from subsequent shows.

The band addressed Denton's absence by announcing on 3 January 2019 via their Twitter account that Denton was no longer playing with the band. On the same day, Denton responded via his personal account that the position was "complicated" and that his advisers had told him not to discuss the matter for the time being. In 2020, it was revealed that Denton's departure from The Kooks was partly so that he could spend more time with his wife and children, which Pritchard corroborated two years later while also stating that "things broke down" between the band and Denton, and "essentially he lost the love for it."

After being unable to tour in 2020 due to COVID-19, The Kooks made their live return at Tramlines Festival on 23 July 2021 with Jonathan Harvey on bass duties.

=== 10 Tracks to Echo in the Dark (2022) ===
In January 2022, the band released the EP Connection featuring the single "Connection", and announced the album 10 Tracks to Echo in the Dark. In April 2022, the band released the single "Beautiful World" which features German duo Milky Chance. In June 2022, the band released another single "Cold Heart".

=== Never/Know (2024–present) ===
The band released their standalone single titled called "Jeanie" which features from the American indie pop band Lovelytheband. The band announced their new album, Never/Know. When it was announced, their current lineup only featured Pritchard and Harris in the photoshoot, with Alexis Nunez leaving the band but still continuing to tour. He and touring bassist Jonathan Harvey are also included on the album.

== Musical style and influences ==
"It's just like an idea, like a chorus, and then we just jam on it – it happens in loads of different ways. The best songs I find always come from the subconscious, like when you don't think. Not to be pretentious about it, but usually songs just blurt out rather than thinking about it. I never write lyrics and then do a song, I find that really hard – that's like a real skill."

— Pritchard on The Kooks' song-writing

The Kooks have mentioned drawing on a number of varied sources to create their sound, listing the Rolling Stones, the Beatles, Bob Dylan and Chris de Burgh among influences on songwriting style and musical presentation over the course of their four albums.

The band's debut album Inside In/Inside Out was touted as a typical Britpop record, and was influenced by the Libertines, Thin Lizzy, The Police and containing elements of the 60s British pop movement. Pritchard's lyrical style was compared to that of a "younger, less pathetic version of Pete Doherty's mush-mouth style". The band themselves felt the album was not consistent in its direction. "The first record was definitely genre-hopping. [...] The first album was finding its feet, it was gadabout", said Harris in an interview for The Sunday Business Post.

On the follow-up Konk, the band attempted to find a more mature and polished sound. Drawing on a much wider choice of material for the album (about 80 to 90 new songs had been accumulated within the band's repertoire by this stage), the band began to incorporate more a hard-edged rock focus into their music. Critics drew comparisons to the work of The Kinks throughout the album, it being recorded at the studio owned by Ray Davies. Also noted were the band’s growing similarities in musical direction to The Fratellis and the Arctic Monkeys. "I think we've made a dynamic album", Pritchard said. "Every song has its own character. It's a good pop album."

Their fourth album, Listen, includes much more percussion and cross rhythms than previous material. Pritchard described Listen as "percussion sonnets". "The first couple albums I made I never really thought about rhythms, I focused on the recording and the lyrics", Pritchard said.

The band's music has variously been described as pop, pop-rock, and indie-rock.

== Band members ==
Current

- Luke Pritchard – lead vocals, rhythm and lead guitar (2004–present)
- Hugh Harris – lead guitar, backing vocals, piano, keyboards (2004–present), bass (2008–present), rhythm guitar (2004–2008, 2018–present)
- Alexis Nunez – drums, percussion (2012–present)

Former

- Paul Garred – drums, percussion (2004–2009, 2010–2012)
- Max Rafferty – bass, backing vocals (2004–2008)
- Peter Denton – bass, backing vocals, rhythm guitar (2008–2018)
- James Evans - body percussion, didgeridoo (2008-2022)

Touring and session

- Nicholas Millard – drums, percussion (2008)
- Dan Logan – bass, backing vocals (2008)
- Chris Prendergast – drums, percussion (2010–2011)
- Denny Weston – drums (2011–2012), bass (2015)
- Thom Kirkpatrick – synthesizer (2011–2012)
- Jack Berkeley – guitar, percussion, backing vocals (2013–2015)
- Peter Randall – bass, backing vocals (2018–2019)
- Jonathan Harvey – bass, backing vocals (2021–present)

Timeline

== Discography ==
- Inside In / Inside Out (2006)
- Konk (2008)
- Junk of the Heart (2011)
- Listen (2014)
- Let's Go Sunshine (2018)
- 10 Tracks to Echo in the Dark (2022)
- Never/Know (2025)
