= Warburton =

Warburton may refer to

== Places ==
=== Australia ===
- Warburton, Queensland, a locality in the Shire of Boulia
- Warburton River, South Australia
  - East Warburton Basin, the site of a large impact crater
- Warburton, Victoria
  - Lilydale to Warburton Rail Trail
  - Warburton East, Victoria
  - Warburton Highway
  - Warburton Hospital
  - Warburton railway line
  - Warburton railway station
- Warburton, Western Australia
  - Warburton Airport
- Two Mile Flat, New South Wales, a former village that was officially named Warburton.

=== Canada ===
- Mount Warburton Pike, British Columbia, Canada

=== South Africa ===
- Warburton, Mpumalanga, South Africa

=== Pakistan ===
- Warburton, Punjab, Pakistan

=== United Kingdom ===
- Warburton, Greater Manchester, in England
  - Bent Farmhouse, Warburton
  - Church House, Warburton
  - Heatley & Warburton railway station
  - St Werburgh's Church, Warburton
  - Warburton School
- Warburton's Wood Nature Reserve, Kingsley, Cheshire, England

=== United States ===
- Fort Warburton, 1809-built fort protecting Washington D.C.

=== Other places ===
- Warburton Peak, South Georgia
- Warburton Ledge, Antarctica

== People and fictional characters ==
- Warburton (name), including a list of people and fictional characters

== Other ==
- Warburton Lectures, series of theology lectures held in Lincoln’s Inn, London
- Warburtons, British bakery firm
- Warburtons Milk Roll-A-Coaster, roller coaster in Blackpool, England
- Will Warburton, novel by George Gissing
- Warburton House, a historic hotel located in Philadelphia, Pennsylvania, United States
