= Peter Warburton =

Peter Warburton may refer to:

- Peter Egerton-Warburton (1813–1889), British military officer and Australian explorer
- Peter Warburton (judge) (c. 1540–1621), British judge
- Peter Warburton (1588–1666), English barrister and judge
- Peter Warburton (footballer) (born 1951), Australian rules footballer for Carlton
- Sir Peter Warburton, 2nd Baronet (died 1698), of the Warburton baronets
- Sir Peter Warburton, 4th Baronet (1708–1774), of the Warburton baronets
- Sir Peter Warburton, 5th Baronet (1754–1813), of the Warburton baronets

== See also ==
- Warburton (disambiguation)
