= Bent Farmhouse, Warburton =

Listed house in Greater Manchester, England

Bent Farmhouse
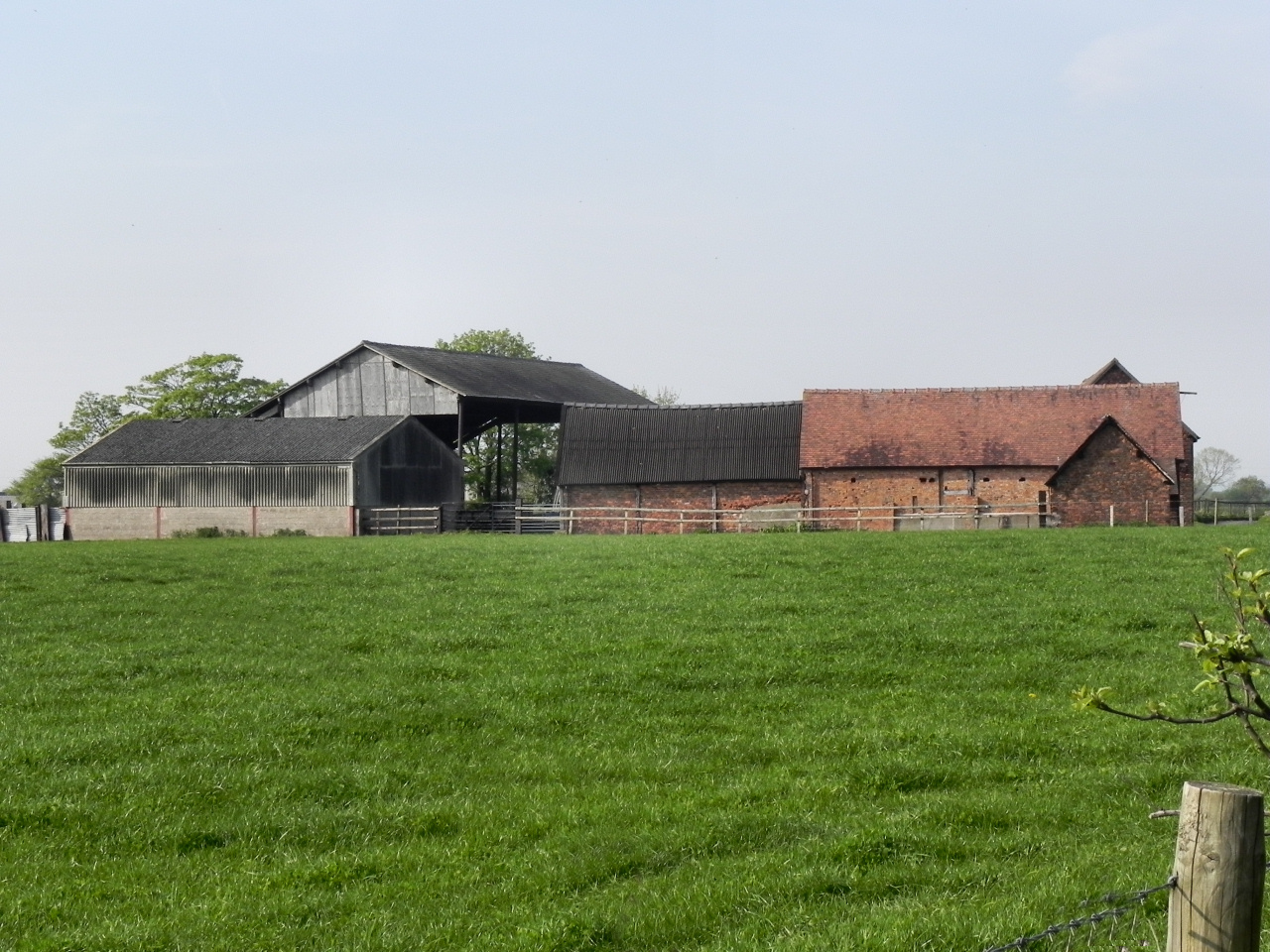
- Bent Farm, Warburton, in 2011

- Location in Greater Manchester

General information
- Architectural style: Vernacular
- Location: Warburton, Greater Manchester, England
- Coordinates: 53.3985°N 2.4465°W
- Year built: 1600
- Renovated: 1880
- Client: Rowland Egerton-Warburton (1880)

Design and construction
- Main contractor: Robert Drinkwater

Renovating team
- Architects: John Douglas (1880 restoration)

Listed Building – Grade II
- Official name: The Bent Farmhouse
- Designated: 12 July 1985
- Reference no.: 1067898

Bent Farmhouse is a 17th-century house located on Bent Lane in Warburton, a village in the Metropolitan Borough of Trafford, Greater Manchester, England. It is recorded in the National Heritage List for England as a designated Grade II listed building.

== History ==
The house was built in 1600 by Robert Drinkwater. It was a timber-framed house which was restored in 1880 by the Chester architect John Douglas for Rowland Egerton-Warburton of Arley Hall, who added "Douglas-like features and character". It stands opposite the church of St Werburgh, which was built in 1883–85.

On 12 July 1985, it was designated a Grade II listed building.

== Architecture ==
The house is built on a stone plinth. It has a brick front with terracotta dressings and much timber framing elsewhere. Douglas' restoration is described as being "heavy" and "interesting".

== See also ==
- Listed buildings in Warburton, Greater Manchester
- List of houses and associated buildings by John Douglas
