= Church House, Warburton =

- Location in Greater Manchester
- 53.3987°N 2.4454°W
- Location: Bent Lane, Warburton, Greater Manchester, England
- OS grid reference: SJ 705 892

History
- Built: 1899
- Built for: Rowland Egerton-Warburton

Site notes
- Architect: John Douglas

Listed Building – Grade II
- Designated: 12 July 1985
- Reference no.: 1067897

Church House is adjacent to St Werburgh's Church, in Bent Lane in the village of Warburton, Greater Manchester, England. It is recorded in the National Heritage List for England as a designated Grade II listed building.

== History ==
Church House was built as parish rooms and a caretaker's house in 1889. Hubbard states that it was built for Rowland Egerton-Warburton and that its design is attributed to the Chester architect John Douglas. However the authors of the Buildings of England series refer to the "Douglas motifs" and give a firm attribution to him. The citation in the National Heritage List for England states that the architect is Douglas. The building continues to function as parish rooms.

== Architecture ==
The building is constructed in brown brick with sandstone dressings and has a red clay tile roof. It has two storeys and a T-shape plan; the wing facing the road constitutes the parish rooms and the wing at the rear forms the caretaker's house. A 20th-century lean-to structure has been added to the left of the front wing. This wing has four bays; the first bay (that on the left) protrudes forwards and is gabled. There is a three-light mullioned and transomed window in both storeys of the left wing, and in the lower storey of each of the other bays. Between the windows in the right bays are buttresses. Above and between the middle two bays is a dormer containing a three-light window. Across the front of the building between the storeys is a band of decorative lozenges in brick and painted plaster. The gable over the left bay also contains lozenge panels and its bargeboard is decorated with carving. On the gable and on the dormer there are finials.

== See also ==
- Listed buildings in Warburton, Greater Manchester
- List of non-ecclesiastical and non-residential works by John Douglas
