= St Werburgh's Church =

St Werburgh's Church, dedicated to Saint Werburgh, may refer to a number of churches in England, and one in Ireland.

== Churches ==
=== England ===
- St Werburgh's Church, Birkenhead, Merseyside
- St Werburgh's Church, Bristol, deconsecrated, now a climbing centre
- St Werburgh's Church, Chester, Cheshire
- St Werburgh's Church, Chorlton-cum-Hardy, Manchester
- St Werburgh's Church, Derby, Derbyshire
- St Werburgh's Church, Kingsley, Staffordshire
- St Werburgh's Church, Spondon, Derbyshire
- St Werburgh's Church, Warbstow, Cornwall
- St Werburgh's Church, Warburton, Greater Manchester
- St Werburgh's Church, Wembury, Devon
- St Werburgh's Church, Hoo St Werburgh Kent.

=== Ireland ===
- St. Werburgh's Church, Dublin

== See also ==
- St Werburghs, an area of Bristol, England
- Werburgh Street, a street in Dublin, Ireland
- Werburgh Street Theatre, a former theatre in Dublin, Ireland
- Abbey of St Werburgh, Chester, England
