= Warburton (name) =

Warburton is surname that derives from the name of the village in Greater Manchester (formerly in Cheshire), England.

People with the name include:

== Surname ==
- List of people with surname Warburton

== Given name ==
- Warburton Gamble (1882–1945), English stage and film actor
- Warburton Pike (1861–1915), English explorer
- Adolphus Warburton Moore (1841–1887), British civil servant and mountaineer
- Sir Charles Warburton Meredith (1896–1977), Rhodesian Air Vice-Marshal
- Denis Warburton Begbie (1914–2009), South African cricketer
- Sir Howard Warburton Elphinstone, 3rd Baronet (1830 or 1831–1917), English baronet and legal academic
- James Warburton Begbie (1826–1876), Scottish physician
- John Warburton Paul (1916–2004), British government official
- John Warburton Sagar (1878–1941), English rugby player and diplomat
- Leonard Warburton Matters (1881–1951), Australian journalist and UK politician
- Philip Warburton Oland (1910–1996), Canadian businessman

== Fictional characters ==
- Melissa Warburton, a character in the TV series Friends

== See also ==
Warburton (disambiguation)
