= John Bradshaw (judge) =

17th-century English judge (c. 1602 - 1659)

Lord President of the Council of State John Bradshaw
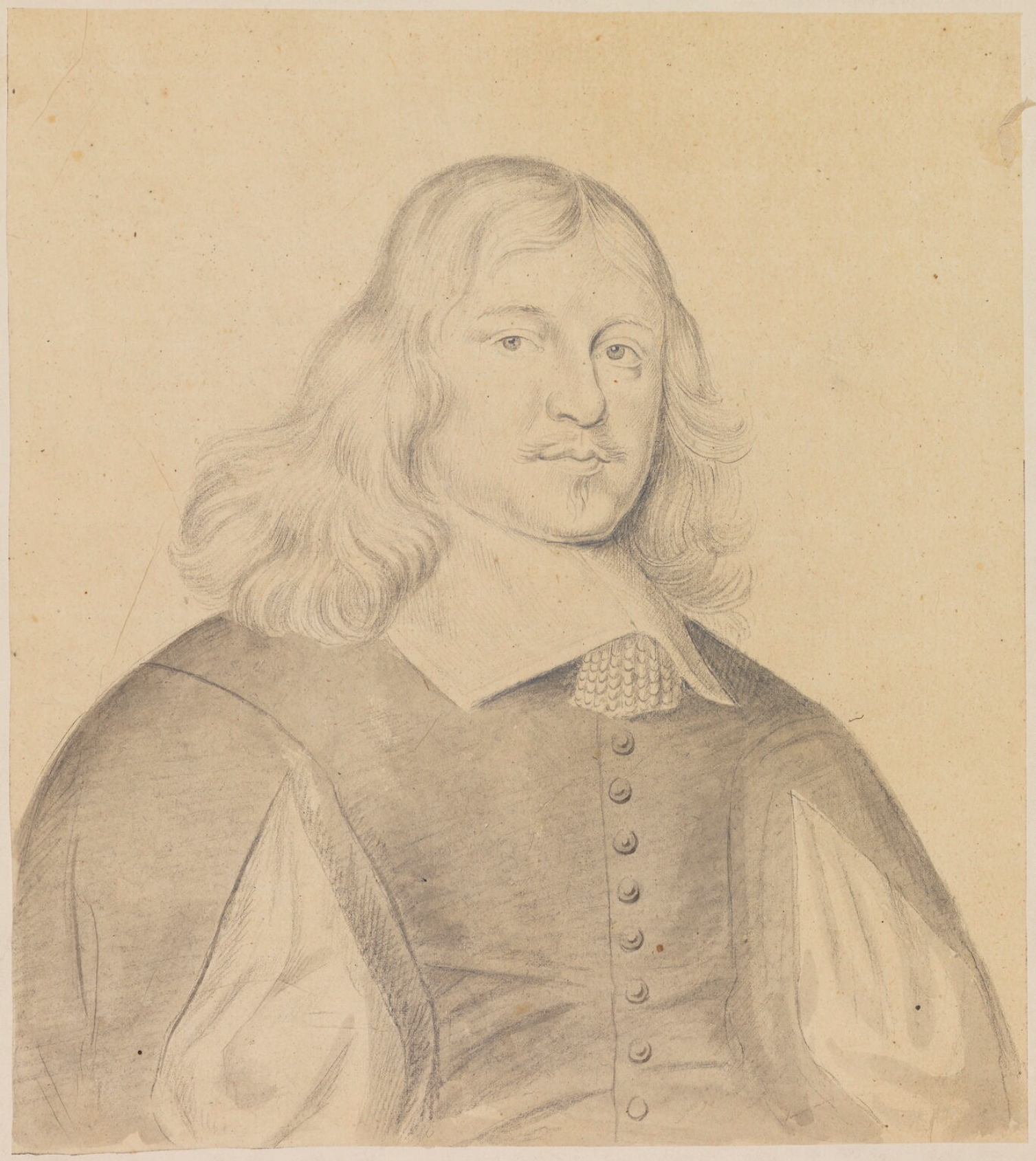
- 19th century engraving of John Bradshaw by George Perfect Harding

President of the Council of State
- In office 12 March 1649 – 29 December 1651
- Preceded by: Pro tempore Oliver Cromwell
- Succeeded by: Bulstrode Whitelocke

Lord President of High Court of Justice
- In office 10 January 1649 – 30 January 1649

Chancellor of the Duchy of Lancaster
- In office 1658–1659
- Preceded by: Thomas Fell
- Succeeded by: William Lenthal
- In office 1649–1654
- Preceded by: Gilbert Gerrard
- Succeeded by: Thomas Fell

Chief Justice of Chester and North Wales
- Preceded by: Sir Thomas Milward
- Succeeded by: Sir Timothy Turner

Personal details
- Born: 15 July 1602 Wyberslegh Hall, England
- Died: 31 October 1659 (aged 57) Westminster Abbey, England
- Resting place: Initially, Westminster Abbey
- Spouse: Mary Marbury
- Education: King's School, Macclesfield
- Alma mater: Gray's Inn

John Bradshaw (12 July 1602 – 31 October 1659) was an English jurist who was President of the High Court of Justice for the trial of Charles I and the first Lord President of the Council of State of the English Commonwealth.

== Early life ==
John Bradshaw, the second son of Henry Bradshaw and Catherine Winnington, was born in 1602 probably at Wybersley (Wyberslegh) Hall in the village of High Lane near Stockport, Cheshire, or possibly at the nearby Peace Farm, Marple (his father farmed at both) and baptised on 10 December in Stockport Church. As a child he attended the free school at Stockport, as well as schools in Bunbury and Middleton. During his teenage years he also attended The King's School, Macclesfield. According to local tradition he wrote the following inscription on a gravestone at either Macclesfield or Bunbury:

"My brother Henry must heir the land,
My brother Frank must be at his command;
Whilst I, poor Jack, will do that
That all the world will wonder at!"

He was articled as clerk to an attorney in Congleton. The White Lion public house bears a blue plaque, placed by the Congleton Civic Society, which reads: "The White Lion, built 16–17th century. Said to have housed the attorney's office where John Bradshaw, regicide, served his articles."

After studying English law in London, he was called to the bar at Gray's Inn on 23 April 1627. He served on the provincial bar of Congleton until he became mayor in 1637. John Milton wrote highly of Bradshaw's aptitude during his public service, saying that "All his early life he was sedulously employed in making himself acquainted with the laws of the country; he then practised with singular success and reputation at the bar."

On 3 January 1638 he was married to Mary, a daughter of Thomas Marbury.

At some time between 1640 and 1643, Bradshaw moved from Congleton to Basinghall Street in London. In 1643, he was elected judge of the London sheriff's court. He maintained the post until his death. Following the death of the Earl of Essex in 1646, Parliament voted Somerhill House to Bradshaw. He was appointed a serjeant-at-law by Parliament and in 1648 Chief Justice of Chester and North Wales.

== Trial of the King ==
In 1649, he was made president of the parliamentary commission to try the king. Other lawyers of greater prominence had refused the position.

Bradshaw was a controversial choice as Lord President, and opinions of his efficiency as a judge varied. Bulstrode Whitelocke believed that he was "learned in his profession," but Thomas Fuller dismissed him as a man "of execrable memory, of whom nothing good is remembered." The King himself, as well as much of the court, professed to having never heard of him.

Bradshaw himself did not attend court until the third session after his appointment, apologising on the grounds that he had been out of London and disavowed his ability to perform "so important a task." While he served as the Lord President, he was flanked by an impressive personal guard and carried a sword at his side. He wore scarlet robes and a "broad-brimmed, bullet-proof beaver hat, which he had covered over with velvet and lined it with steel and he also wore armour underneath his robes." King Charles refused to recognise the authority of the court and would not plead. After declaring Charles I guilty as a "Tyrant, Traitor, Murderer, and a public enemy," Bradshaw did not allow the king any final words. Under English law, a condemned prisoner was no longer alive and therefore did not have the right to speak, and Bradshaw followed this tradition strictly.

It is said that he dined at Odstone Hall in Leicestershire, then his property, after signing the warrant for the king's execution in 1649.

== Commonwealth and Protectorate ==
On 12 March 1649, Bradshaw was elected President of the Council of State, which was to act as the executive of the country's government in place of the king and the Privy Council.

From 1 August 1649, Bradshaw also held the post of Chancellor of the Duchy of Lancaster. As Lord President he conducted trials of leading Royalists and condemned to death by beheading the Duke of Hamilton, Lord Capell, the Earl of Holland and Eusebius Andrews, for which he was well rewarded.

After wars in Scotland and Ireland, the Long Parliament had still not dissolved itself or called for re-elections. On 30 April 1653, Oliver Cromwell declared Parliament and the Council dissolved and soon assumed rule as Lord Protector calling elections for a new parliament himself. After that date Bradshaw served as commissioner of the duchy, jointly with Thomas Fell, until mounting differences with Cromwell culminated in his resignation in 1654.

Bradshaw, an ardent Republican, became an opponent of the Protectorate. In 1654, he was elected Member of Parliament (MP) for Stafford and Cheshire, but because he refused to sign the recognition pledge put on Members to declare their recognition of the new army-backed government, he took no seat for either constituency. In 1655, the Major-General in charge of Cheshire, Tobias Bridge, persuaded leading gentry not to enter Bradshaw as the county's parliamentary candidate at elections to the next parliament.

After Oliver Cromwell died in 1658, his son Richard succeeded him as Lord Protector and reinstated Bradshaw as Chancellor of the Duchy of Lancaster. Bradshaw was elected MP for Cheshire in the Third Protectorate Parliament in 1659. During the same year, Bradshaw moved to Westminster after falling dangerously ill with a 'quartan ague' or malaria.

In October 1659, various subordinate members of the army sabotaged General Lambert's and General Ludlow's support of the Long Parliament. Colonel Morley, Major Grimes, and Colonel Sydenham eventually gained their points, and placed guards both by land and water, to hinder the members of Parliament from approaching the House. During these disorders, the Council of State still assembled at the usual place and the:

Lord President Bradshaw, who was present, though by long sickness very weak and much extenuated, yet animated by his ardent zeal and constant affection to the common cause, upon hearing Col Syndenham's justifications of the proceedings of the army in again disrupting parliament, stood up and interrupted him, declaring his abhorrence of that detestable action, and telling the council, that being now going to his God, he had not patience to sit there to hear his great name so openly blasphemed; and thereupon departed to his lodgings, and withdrew himself from public employment.

He died on 31 October 1659, aged 57. He was buried with great honours at Westminster Abbey. The eulogy was given by John Rowe. On his deathbed Bradshaw said that if called upon to try the king again he would be "the first man in England to do it".

== Posthumous execution ==
Charles II returned to power in 1660. On 30 January 1661, the twelfth anniversary of the regicide, the bodies of Bradshaw, Cromwell and Henry Ireton were ordered to be exhumed and displayed in chains all day on the gallows at Tyburn. At sunset, the three bodies that had been displayed publicly as those of the three judges being executed posthumously were all beheaded. The bodies were thrown into a common pit and the heads displayed on pikes at Westminster Hall. Samuel Pepys wrote in his diary that he saw the heads there on 5 February. The body of Bradshaw's wife was also exhumed from Westminster Abbey and, along with the remains of other Parliamentarians buried at Westminster, reburied in a common pit at St Margaret's, Westminster.

== Jamaica connection ==
The story of John Bradshaw's son James moving his body to Jamaica is thought to be a piece of 18th-century political folklore created as propaganda during the American War of Independence.

Some sources claim that the body of Bradshaw had previously been removed by his son, James or John Bradshaw, who re-buried his father's remains on a hill near Martha's Brae on Jamaica and marked the spot with a cannon. A location known as "Gun Hill" is 2.5 miles south-west of the northern port city of Falmouth, in Trelawny Parish. One of the three men had children who removed to Highland County, Virginia. James Bradshaw acquired the land in Jamaica where his father's remains were buried. Several sources recorded an inscription with the cannon found on Gun Hill, Jamaica, and attribute the quote Rebellion to tyrants is obedience to God to John Bradshaw.

Historically it is thought John Bradshaw died childless.

== Legacy ==
While some political philosophers have defended Bradshaw, most legal authorities have taken the view expressed in 1999 by Michael Kirby (then a Justice of the High Court of Australia) that the High Court of Justice for the trial of Charles I, of which Bradshaw was president, was illegal. However, in his 2005 book The Tyrannicide Brief (a biography of John Cook, the prosecutor at the trial), Geoffrey Robertson Q.C. put forward the argument that while the court was illegal due to the political settlement reached at the Restoration of the monarchy in 1660, the trial anticipated the developments in humanitarian law in the second half of the 20th century, and that the leading participants in the trial are to be admired rather than condemned.

== Bradshaw in popular culture ==
- Bradshaw was played by Stratford Johns in the 1970 historical drama film Cromwell.
- Bradshaw appears in several short stories set in the alternative history 1632 Series. In that series, King Charles discovers his future fate by reading books brought to the past in the time-displaced town of Grantville and orders the arrest and execution of almost everyone who would later have been involved in his trial and execution. In one story, John Milton is told by his father that Bradshaw has been executed, but several other stories say that Bradshaw escaped from England and journeyed to Grantville, becoming one of the town's junior district attorneys, and becoming part of a government-in-exile that plots to overthrow Charles and his tyrannical ministers.

== Notes ==
Legal offices
Preceded by Sir Thomas Milward	Chief Justice of Chester; 1648–1650	Succeeded by Sir Timothy Turner
Preceded by Gilbert Gerrard	Chancellor of the Duchy of Lancaster (Commissioner 1653–1654); 1649–54	Succeeded by Thomas Fell
Preceded by Thomas Fell	Chancellor of the Duchy of Lancaster; 1658–1659	Succeeded by William Lenthall
