= Ancient borough =

Historic unit of lower-tier local government in England and Wales

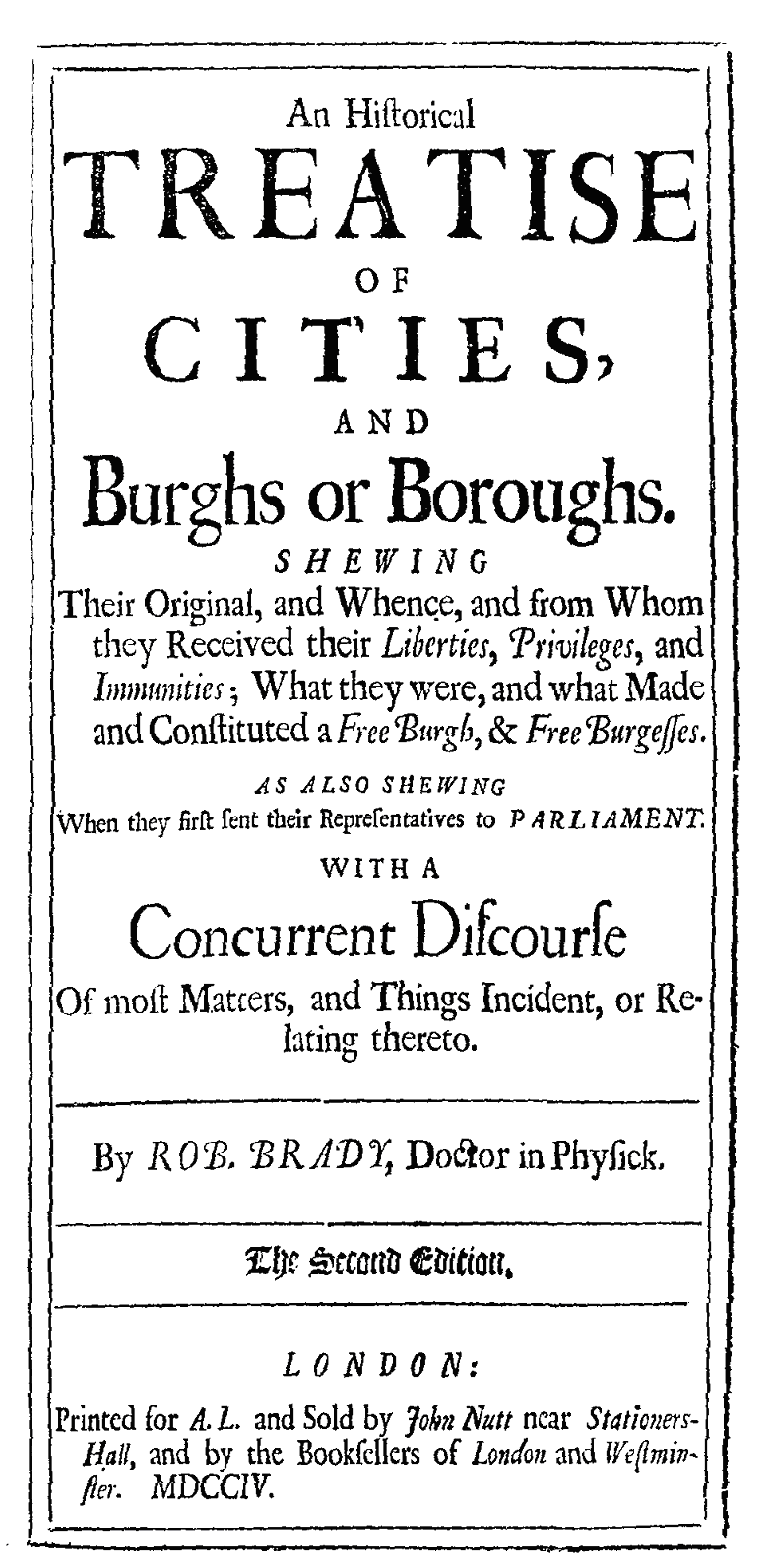
An early historical analysis of cities and boroughs by Robert Brady (1704)

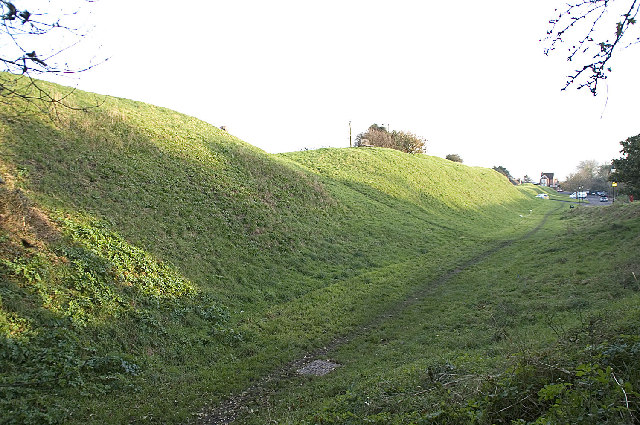
The burh wall at Wareham

An ancient borough was a historic unit of lower-tier local government in England and Wales. The ancient boroughs covered only important towns and were established by charters granted at different times by the monarchy. Their history is largely concerned with the origin of such towns and how they gained the right of self-government. Ancient boroughs were reformed by the Municipal Corporations Act 1835, which introduced directly elected corporations and allowed the incorporation of new industrial towns. Municipal boroughs ceased to be used for the purposes of local government in 1974, with borough status retained as an honorific title granted to some post-1974 local government districts by the Crown.

== Anglo-Saxon burhs ==
Throughout Britain, the effect of the Germanic invasions which completed the decline of the Roman Empire was to destroy the Roman municipal organisation. After the Anglo-Saxon settlement of Britain, the ruins of Roman colonies and camps were used by the early English to form tribal strongholds. Despite their location, burhs on the sites of Roman colonies show no continuity with Roman municipal organisation, and instead resemble the parallel revival of urban centres in continental Europe. The resettlement of the Roman Durovernum under the name "burh of the men of Kent", Cant-wara-byrig or Canterbury, illustrates this point. The burh of the men of West Kent was Hrofesceaster (Latin: Durobrivae, now Rochester), and many other ceasters mark the existence of a Roman camp occupied by an early English burh. The tribal burh was protected by an earthen wall, and a general obligation to build and maintain burhs at the royal command was enforced by Anglo-Saxon law.

Offences in disturbance of the peace of the burh were punished by higher fines than breaches of the peace of the hām or ordinary dwelling. However, neither in the early English language nor in the contemporary Latin was there any fixed usage differentiating the various words descriptive of the several forms of human settlement, and the fortified communal refuges cannot accordingly be clearly distinguished from villages or the strongholds of individuals by any purely nomenclative test.

=== Danish invasions ===
At the end of the 9th century and beginning of the 10th century there is evidence of a systematic "timbering" of new burhs, with the object of providing strongholds for the defence of Wessex against the Danes, and it appears that the surrounding districts were charged with their maintenance. It is not until after the Danish invasions that it becomes easier to draw a distinction between the burhs that served as military strongholds for national defence and the royal vills which served no such purpose. Some of the royal vills eventually entered the class of boroughs, but by another route, and for the present the private stronghold and the royal dwelling may be neglected. It was the public stronghold and the administrative centre of a dependent district which was the source of the main features peculiar to the borough. Many causes tended to create peculiar conditions in the boroughs built for national defence. They were placed where artificial defence was most needed, at the junction of roads, in the plains, on the rivers, at the centres naturally marked out for trade, seldom where hills or marshes formed a sufficient natural defence. Typically, the fortification of a burh consisted of earth ramparts faced with timber. Palisades were sometimes used.

The concept of a network of burhs as a defence in depth is usually attributed to Alfred.

The solution that Alfred devised for this apparently intractable predicament was nothing short of a revolution and that revolution began now in the 880s. If the Vikings could attack anywhere at any time, then the West Saxons had to be able to defend everywhere all the time. To make this possible Alfred ordered the construction of a network of defended centres across his kingdom, some built on refortified Roman and Iron Age sites, some built completely from scratch. These burhs were to be distributed so that no West Saxon was more than twenty or so miles – a day's march – from one of them.

This network is described in a manuscript document which has survived in later iterations, named by scholars the Burghal Hidage, which lists thirty three burhs in Wessex and English Mercia. Most of these survived into the post Norman Conquest era and are the core of later Parliamentary Boroughs and municipal corporations.

=== Commercial significance ===
Following the successful reconquest from the Vikings by Alfred's descendants Edward and Æthelstan, the latter made a series of reforms in law, the Codes issued at the Council of Grately, which gave additional impetus to the urban development of the burhs which hitherto had been mainly forts. The burhs drew commerce by every channel; the camp and the palace, the administrative centre, the ecclesiastical centre (for the mother-church of the state was placed in its chief burh), all looked to the market for their maintenance. The burh was provided by law with a mint and royal moneyers and exchangers, with an authorised scale for weights and measures. Mercantile transactions in the burhs or ports, as they were called when their commercial rather than their military importance was accentuated, were placed by law under special legal privileges in order no doubt to secure the king's hold upon his toll. Over the burh or port was set a reeve, a royal officer answerable to the king for his dues from the burh, his rents for lands and houses, his customs on commerce, his share of the profits from judicial fines.

=== Legal and administrative roles ===
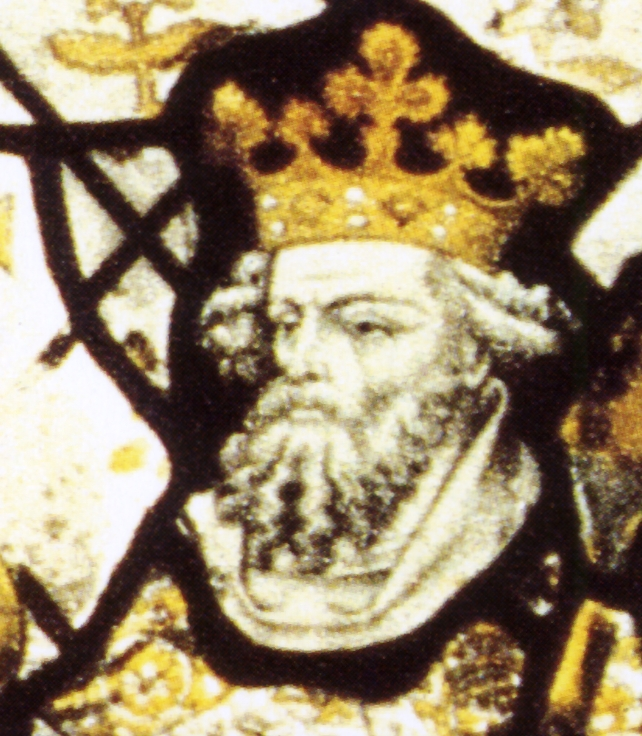
Edgar, King of England, 959 to 975

At least from the 10th century the burh had a moot or court, the relation of which to the other courts is matter of speculation. A law of Edgar, about 960, required that it should meet three times a year, these being in all likelihood assemblies at which attendance was compulsory on all tenants of the burghal district, when pleas concerning life and liberty and land were held, and men were compelled to find pledges answerable for their good conduct. At these great meetings the borough reeve (ġerēfa) presided, declaring the law and guiding the judgments given by the suitors of the court. The reeve was supported by a group of assistants, called in Devon the witan, in the boroughs of the Danelaw by a group of (generally twelve) "lawmen", in other towns probably by a group of aldermen, senior burgesses, with military and police authority, whose office was in some cases hereditary. These persons assisted the reeve at the great meetings of the full court, and sat with him as judges at the subordinate meetings which were held to settle the unfinished cases and minor causes. There was no compulsion on those not specially summoned to attend these extra meetings. At these subordinate jurisdictional assemblies, held in public, and acting by the same authority as the annual gathering of all the burh-wara, other business concerning borough administration was decided, at least in later days, and it is to these assemblies that the origin of the town council may in many cases be ascribed.

In the larger towns the division into wards, with a separate police system, can be traced at an early time, appearing as a unit of military organisation, answerable for the defence of a gate of the town. The police system of London is described in detail in a record of 930–940. Here the free people were grouped in associations of ten, each under the superintendence of a headman. The bishops and reeves who belonged to the "court of London" appear as the directors of the system, and in them we may see the aldermen of the wards of a later time. The use of the word bertha for ward at Canterbury, and the fact that the London wardmoot at a later time was used for the frankpledge system as well as for the organisation of the muster, point to a connexion between the military and the police systems in the towns.

In charters of the Anglo-Saxon period a haw, or enclosed area within a burh, was often conveyed by charter as if it were an apanage of the lands in the neighbourhood with which it was conveyed; the Norman settlers who succeeded to lands in the county succeeded therewith to houses in the burhs, for a close association existed between the thegns of the shire and the shirestow, an association partly perhaps of duty and also of privilege. The king granted borough haws as places of refuge in Kent, and in London he gave them with commercial privileges to his bishops. What has been called the heterogeneous tenure of the shirestow, one of the most conspicuous characteristics of that particular type of borough, was further increased by the liberty which some burgesses enjoyed to "commend" themselves to a lord of their own choosing, promising to that lord suit and service and perhaps rent in return for protection. Over these burgesses the lords could claim jurisdictional rights, and these were in some cases increased by royal grants of special rights within certain sokes. The great boroughs were honeycombed with sokes, or areas of seignorial jurisdiction, within which the royal reeve's authority was greatly restricted while that of the lord's reeve took precedence. Even the haws, being "burhs" or strongholds within a stronghold, enjoyed a local "peace" which protected from official intrusion.

Besides heterogeneity of tenure and jurisdiction in the borough, there was also heterogeneity of status; there were burh-thegns and cnihts, mercatores, burgesses of various kinds, the three groups representing perhaps military, commercial and agricultural elements. The burh generally shows signs of having been originally a village settlement, surrounded by open fields, of which the borough boundary before 1835 will suggest the outline. This area was as a rule eventually the area of borough jurisdiction. There is some evidence pointing to the fact that the restriction of the borough authority to this area is not ancient, but due to the Norman settlement.

== Boroughs in Norman England ==
The wide districts over which the boroughs had had authority were placed under the control of the Norman castle which was itself built by means of the old English levy of burhwork. The borough court was allowed to continue its work only within its own immediate territory, and, to prevent conflict, the castle was placed outside the borough. Losing their place in the national scheme of defence, the burgess cnihts made commerce their principal object under the encouragement of the old privileges of the walled place. Besides the great co-operative strongholds in which many lords had burgesses, there were small boroughs held by a single lord. In many cases boroughs of this "seignorial" type were created upon the royal estates. Out of the king's vill, as a rule the jurisdictional centre of a hundred, there was sometimes created a borough. The lines of division before Domesday Book are obscure, but it is probable that in some cases, by a royal grant of jurisdiction, the inhabitants of a populous royal vill, where a hundred court for the district was already held, were authorised to establish a permanent court, for the settlement of their disputes, distinct from the hundred court of the district. Boroughs of this type with a uniform tenure were created not only on the king's estates but also on those of his tenants-in-chief, and in 1086 they were probably already numerous.

=== Town and manor ===
As noted by Stenton, the practice evident in the Norman period whereby lords living in country manors owned houses in the nearest borough was a continuation of a custom developed earlier by the Anglo-Saxons:

It is clear from the Domesday Book that in 1086 a piece of borough property – a messuage, a house, or a group of houses – was often annexed to a manor in the open country. At Leicester, for example, 134 houses were thus attached, singly or in groups, to 27 different manors. So far as can be seen the borough property was treated as a profit-yielding appendage of the manor. It provided the lord with a lodging when he came to the borough on business and with a place of refuge in time of trouble.... Most of the evidence which illustrates this practice relates to the time after the conquest, but it can be traced far back into the Anglo-Saxon period, and the Anglo-Saxon kings had encouraged it.

=== Privileges granted to boroughs to encourage settlement near castles ===
A borough was usually, though perhaps not invariably, the companion of a Norman castle. In some cases a French bourg was created by the side of an English borough, and the two remained for many generations distinct in their laws and customs: in other cases a French bourg was settled by the side of an English village. A large number of the followers of the Norman lords had been almost certainly town-dwellers in their own country, and lost none of their burghal privileges by the migration. Every castle needed for its maintenance a group of skilled artisans, and the lords wished to draw to the castle gates all kinds of commodities for the castle's provision. The strength of the garrison made the neighbourhood of the castle a place of danger to men unprotected by legal privilege; and to invite to its neighbourhood desirable settlers, legal privileges similar to those enjoyed in Norman or English boroughs were guaranteed to those who would build on the plots which were offered to colonists. A low fixed rental, release from the renders required of villeins, release from the jurisdiction of the castle, and the creation of a separate borough jurisdiction, with or without the right to choose their own officers, rules fixing the maximum of fees and fines, or promising assessment of the fines by the burgesses themselves, the cancelling of all the castellan's rights, especially the right to take a forced levy of food for the castle from all within the area of his jurisdiction, freedom from arbitrary tallage, freedom of movement, the right to alienate property and devise land, these and many other privileges named in the early seignorial charters were what constituted the Norman liber burgus of the seignorial type.

Not all these privileges were enjoyed by all boroughs; some very meagre releases of seignorial rights accompanied the lord's charter which created a borough and made burgesses out of villeins. However liberal the grant, the lord or his reeve still remained in close personal relation with the burgesses of such places, and this character, together with the uniformity of their tenure, continued to hold them apart from the boroughs of the old English type, where all varieties of personal relationship between the lords and their groups of tenants might subsist. The royal charters granting the right to retain old customs prevented the systematic introduction into the old boroughs of some of the incidents of feudalism. Rights of the king took precedence of those of the lord, and devise with the king's consent was legal. By these means the lords' position was weakened, and other seignorial claims were later evaded or contested. The rights which the lords failed to keep were divided between the king and the municipality; in London, for instance, the king obtained all escheats, while the borough court secured the right of wardship of burgess orphans. From Norman times the yearly profit of the royal boroughs was as a rule included in the general "farm" rendered for the county by the sheriff; sometimes it was rendered by a royal farmer apart from the county-farm. The king generally accepted a composition for all the various items due from the borough. The burgesses were united in their efforts to keep that composition unchanged in amount, and to secure the provision of the right amount at the right time for fear that it should be increased by way of punishment.

=== Charters ===
The levy of fines on rent arrear, and the distraints for debt due, which were obtained through the borough court, were a matter of interest to the burgesses of the court, and first taught the burgesses co-operative action. Money was raised, possibly by order of the borough court, to buy a charter from the king giving the right to choose officers who should answer directly to the exchequer and not through the sheriff of the county. The sheriff was in many cases also the constable of the castle, set by the Normans to overawe the English boroughs; his powers were great and dangerous enough to make him an officer specially obnoxious to the boroughs. Henry I about 1131 gave the London citizens the right to choose their own sheriffs and a justiciar answerable for keeping the pleas of the crown. In 1130 the Lincoln citizens paid to hold their city in chief of the king. By the end of the 12th century many towns paid by the hand of their own reeves, and John's charters began to make rules as to the freedom of choice to be allowed in the nomination of borough officers and as to the royal power of dismissal.

In Richard I's reign London imitated the French communes in styling the chief officer a mayor; in 1208 Winchester also had a mayor, and the title soon became no rarity. The chartered right to choose two or more citizens to keep the pleas of the crown gave to many boroughs the control of their coroners, who occupied the position of the London justiciar of earlier days, subject to those considerable modifications which Henry II's systematisation of the criminal law had introduced. Burgesses who had gone for criminal and civil justice to their own court in disputes between themselves, or between themselves and strangers who were in their town, secured confirmation of this right by charter, not to exclude the justices in eyre, but to exempt themselves from the necessity of pleading in a distant court. The burgess, whether plaintiff or defendant, was a privileged person, and could claim in this respect a "benefit" somewhat similar to the benefit of clergy. In permitting the boroughs to answer through their own officers for his dues, the king handed over to the boroughs the farming of his rents and a large number of rights which would eventually prove to be sources of great profit. No records exist showing the nature of municipal proceedings at the time of the first purchase of charters. Certain it is that the communities in the 12th century became alive to the possibilities of their new position, that trade received a new impulse, and the vague constitutional powers of the borough court acquired a new need for definition. At first the selection of officers who were to treat with the exchequer and to keep the royal pleas was almost certainly restricted to a few rich persons who could find the necessary securities. Nominated probably in one of the smaller judicial assemblies, the choice was announced at the great Michaelmas assembly of the whole community, and it is not till the next century that we hear of any attempt of the vulgus to make a different selection from that of the magnates. The vulgus were able to take effective action by means of the several craft organisations, and first found the necessity to do so when taxation was heavy or when questions of trade legislation were mooted.

=== Taxation leads to political reformation ===
The taxation of the boroughs in the reign of Henry II was assessed by the king's justices, who fixed the sums due per capita; but if the borough made an offer of a gift, the assessment was made by the burgesses. In the first case the taxation fell on the magnates. In the levy per communam the assessment was made through the wardmoots (in London) and the burden fell on the poorer class. In Henry II's reign London was taxed by both methods, the barones majores by head, the barones minores through the wardmoot. The pressure of taxation led in the 13th century to a closer definition of the burghal constitutions; the Commons sought to get an audit of accounts, and (in London) not only to hear but to treat of municipal affairs. By the end of the century London had definitely established two councils, that of the mayor and aldermen, representing the old borough court, and a common council, representing the voice of the commonalty, as expressed through the city wards. The choice of councillors in the wards rested probably with the aldermen and the ward jury summoned by them to make the presentments. In some cases juries were summoned not to represent different areas but different classes; thus at Lincoln there were in 1272 juries of the rich, the middling and the poor, chosen presumably by authority from groups divided by means of the tax roll. Elsewhere the several groups of traders and artisans made of their gilds all-powerful agencies for organising joint action among classes of commons united by a trade interest, and the history of the towns becomes the history of the struggle between the gilds which captured control of the council and the gilds which were excluded therefrom.

Many municipal revolutions took place, and a large number of constitutional experiments were tried all over the country from the 13th century onward. Schemes which directed a gradual co-optation, two to choose four, these six to choose more, and so in widening circles from a centre of officialdom, found much favour throughout the Middle Ages. A plan, like the London plan, of two companies, alderman and council, was widely favoured in the 14th century, perhaps in imitation of the Houses of Lords and Commons. The mayor was sometimes styled the "sovereign" and was given many prerogatives. Great respect was paid to the "ancients", those, namely, who had already held municipal office. Not till the 15th century were orderly arrangements for counting "voices" arrived at in a few of the most highly developed towns, and these were used only in the small assemblies of the governing body, not in the large electoral assemblies of the people. In London in the 13th century there was a regular system for the admission of new members to the borough "franchise", which was at first regarded not as conferring any form of suffrage but as a means to secure a privileged position in the borough court and in the trade of the borough. Admission could be obtained by inheritance, by purchase or gift, in some places by marriage, and in London, at least from 1275, by a municipal register of apprenticeship. The new freeman in return for his privileges was bound to share with the other burgesses all the burdens of taxation, control, &c., which fell upon burgesses. Personal service was not always necessary, and in some towns there were many non- resident burgesses. When in later times admission to this freedom came to be used as means to secure the parliamentary franchise, the freedom of the borough was freely sold and given.

The elections in which the commons of the boroughs first took interest were those of the borough magistrates. Where the commons succeeded for a time in asserting their right to take part in borough elections they were rarely able to keep it, not in all cases perhaps because their power was feared, but sometimes because of the riotous proceedings which ensued. These led to government interference, which no party in the borough desired. The possibility of a forfeiture of their enfranchised position made the burgesses on the whole fairly submissive. In the 13th century London repeatedly was "taken into the king's hand," subjected to heavy fines and put under the constable of the Tower.

== Charters of incorporation ==
In the 15th century disturbances in the boroughs led to the creation of new constitutions, some of which were the outcome of royal charters, others the result of parliamentary legislation. The development of the law of corporations also at this time compelled the boroughs to seek new charters which should satisfy the now exacting demands of the law. The charters of incorporation were issued at a time when the king's government was looking more and more to the borough authorities as part of its executive and judicial staff, and thus the government was closely interested in the manner of their selection. The new charters were drafted in such a way as to narrow the popular control. The boroughs were placed under the control of a corporation headed by a mayor, and in most cases leading to no concept of popular control, the whole system of appointment to the corporation being one of co-option by existing members. Absence of popular protest to this may in part be due to old popular control being more nominal than real, and the new charters gave as a rule two councils of considerable size. These councils bore a heavy burden of taxation in meeting royal loans and benevolences, paying per capita, like the magnates of the 12th century, and for a time there is on the whole little evidence of friction between the governors and the governed. Throughout, unpopular changes or neglect in the closest of corporations had a means of official protest, though no means of execution, in the presentments of the leet juries and sessions juries. By means of their "verdicts" they could use threats against the governing body, express their resentment against acts of the council which benefited the governing body rather than the town, and call in the aid of the justices of the assizes (judges, in the seasons of sittings outside of London, "assizes") where the members of the governing body were suspected of fraud.

Elizabeth repeatedly declared her dislike of incorporations "because of the abuses committed by their head rulers," but in her reign they were fairly easily controlled by the privy council, which directed their choice of members of Parliament and secured supporters of the government policy to fill vacancies on the borough bench. The practice in Tudor and Stuart charters of specifying by name the members of the governing body and holders of special offices opened the way to a "purging" of the hostile spirits when new charters were required. There were also rather vaguely worded clauses authorising the dismissal of officers for misconduct, although as a rule the appointments were for life. When under the Stuarts and under the Commonwealth political and religious feeling ran high in the boroughs, use was made of these clauses both by the majority on the council and by the central government to mould the character of the council by a drastic "purging". Another means of control first used under the Commonwealth was afforded by the various acts of Parliament, which subjected all holders of municipal office to the test of an oath. Under the Commonwealth there was no improvement in the methods used by the central government to control the boroughs.

All opponents of the ruling policy were disfranchised and disqualified from office by act of Parliament in 1652. Cases arising out of the act were to be tried by commissioners, and the commissions of the major-generals gave them opportunity to control the borough policy. Few Commonwealth charters have been preserved, although several were issued in response to the requests of the corporations. In some cases the charters used words which appeared to point to an opportunity for popular elections in boroughs, where a usage of election to the corporation by the town council had been established. In 1598 the judges gave an opinion that the town councils could make by-laws determining the government of the towns regardless of the terms of the charter. In the 18th century the judges decided to the contrary. But even where a usage of popular election was established, there were means of controlling the result of a parliamentary election. The close corporations, though their right to choose a member of Parliament might be doubtful, had the sole right to admit new burgesses, and whether in parliamentary elections to enfranchise non-residents. Where conflicts arose over the choice of a member of Parliament, two competing selections were typically made and the matter came before the House of Commons. The Commons quite often decided in favour of the more popularly elected candidate against the nominee of the town council, on the general principle that neither the royal charter nor a by-law could curtail the usual franchise. But as each case rested on the national body swayed by the dominant political party, no principle was steadily adhered to in the trial of election petitions. The royal right to create boroughs was freely used by Elizabeth and James I as a means of securing a submissive Parliament.

=== Crown control of boroughs in the restoration ===
The later Stuarts abandoned this method, and the few new boroughs made by the Georges were not made for political reasons. The object of the later Stuarts was to control the corporations already in existence, not to make new ones. Charles II, from the time of his restoration decided to exercise a strict control of the close corporations to secure not only submissive parliaments, but also a pliant executive among the borough justices, and pliant juries, which were impanelled at the selection of the borough officers. In 1660 it was made a rule that all future (town) charters should reserve expressly to the Crown the first nomination (naming) of the aldermen, recorder and town-clerk, and a proviso should be entered placing with the common council the return of the member of parliament. The Corporation Act 1661 gave power to royal commissioners to settle the composition of the town councils, and to remove all who refused the sacraments of the Church of England or were suspected of disaffection, even though they offered to take the necessary oaths. Even so, the difficulty of securing submissive juries was again so great in 1682 that a general attack on the borough franchises was begun by the crown. A London jury having returned a verdict hostile to the crown and taxation, after various attempts to bend the city to his will, Charles II issued a quo warranto against the mayor and commonalty to charge the citizens with illegal encroachments beyond their chartered rights. The way this was analogous to well-precedented Crown rights to regulate the actions of organised groups of men such as rebels, made it easy for the crown judges to find legally flawed actions of the boroughs, and also made it possible for the Londoners to argue that no execution could be taken against the mayor, commonalty and citizens, a "body politic invisible"; that the indictment lay only against every particular member of the governing body; and that the corporation as a corporation was incapable of suffering a forfeiture or of making a surrender. The judges gave a judgment for the king, the charters were forfeited and the government placed with a court of aldermen of the king's own choosing. Until James II yielded, there was no common council in London. The novelty of the proceedings of Charles II and James II lay in using the weapon of the quo warranto systematically to ensure a general revocation of charters. The new charters which were then granted required the king's consent for the more important appointments, and gave him power to remove officers without reason given.

Under James II in 1687 six commissioners were appointed to "regulate" the corporations and remove from them all persons who were opposed to the abolition of the penal laws against Catholics. The new appointments were made under a writ which ran, "We will and require you to elect" (a named person). When James II sought to withdraw from his disastrous policy, he issued a proclamation restoring to the boroughs their ancient charters. The governing charter thenceforth in many boroughs, though not in all, was the charter which had established a close corporation, and from this time on to 1835 the boroughs made no progress in constitutional growth.

== List of boroughs ==
The following places had borough charters in the period 1307–1660, or are known to have had borough status then or before through other sources:

=== England ===
- Abingdon, Agardsley, Aldborough, Amersham, Andover, Appleby, Arundel, Axbridge, Aylesbury
- Bamborough, Banbury, Barnard Castle, Barnstaple, Baschurch, Basingstoke, Bath, Bedford, Berkhamsted, Berwick-upon-Tweed, Beverley, Bewdley, Bideford, Bishop's Castle, Blandford Forum, Bodmin, Boston, Brading, Bradninch, Bridgwater, Bridgnorth, Bridport, Bristol, Buckingham, Burford, Bury St Edmunds
- Calne, Cambridge, Camelford, Canterbury, Carlisle, Chard, Chester, Chesterfield, Chichester, Chippenham, Chipping Campden, Chipping Norton, Chipping Sodbury, Christchurch, Cirencester, Clitheroe, Clun, Colchester, Colnbrook, Colyford, Congleton, Coventry, Cricklade
- Dartmouth, Daventry, Derby, Devizes, Doncaster, Dorchester, Dover, Droitwich, Dunheved (Launceston), Great Dunmow, Dunster, Dunwich, Durham
- Evesham, Exeter, Eye
- Farnham, Faversham, Folkestone, Fordwich, Frodsham
- Gainsborough, Gloucester, Godalming, Godmanchester, Grampound, Grantham, Gravesend, Grimsby, Guildford
- Hadleigh (Suffolk), Hartlepool, Harwich, Hastings, Hedon, Helston, Hemel Hempstead, Henley-on-Thames, Hereford, Hertford, Higham Ferrers, Horsham, Huntingdon, Hythe (Kent)
- Ilchester, Ilfracombe, Ipswich
- Kendal, Kidderminster, King's Lynn, Kingston upon Hull, Kingston upon Thames, Knutsford
- Lancaster, Langport (formerly Langport Eastover), Launceston, Leeds, Leicester, Leominster, Lichfield, Lincoln, Liskeard, Liverpool, London, Looe (East), Looe (West, also known as Porthbychan), Lostwithiel, Louth, Ludlow, Lydd, Lyme Regis
- Macclesfield, Maidenhead, Maidstone, Maldon, Malmesbury, Marazion, Marlborough, Melcombe Regis, Midhurst, Milborne Port
- Nantwich, Newark-on-Trent, Newbury, Newcastle-under-Lyme, Newcastle upon Tyne, Newport (Isle of Wight), Newport (Shropshire), Newtown (Isle of Wight), Northampton, Norwich, Nottingham
- Okehampton, Orford, Ormskirk, Oswestry, Oxford
- Penryn, Penzance, Pevensey, Plymouth, Plympton, Pontefract, Poole, Portsmouth, Preston
- Queenborough
- Ravenser Odd, Reading, Retford (East), Richmond (Yorks), Ripon, Roby, Rochester, Romney (New), Romsey, Ruyton, Rye
- Saffron Walden, St Albans, St Briavels, St Ives (Cornwall), Salisbury, Saltash, Sandwich, Scarborough, Seaford, Shaftesbury, Sheffield, Sherbourne, Shrewsbury, Southampton, South Molton, Southwark, Southwell, Southwold, Stafford, Stamford, Stockton-on-Tees, Stratford-upon-Avon, Sudbury, Sunderland, Sutton Coldfield
- Tamworth, Taunton, Tenterden, Tewkesbury, Thaxted, Thetford, Tintagel, Tiverton, Torksey, Torrington, Totnes, Tregony, Truro
- Ulverston
- Wainfleet All Saints, Wallingford, Walsall, Wareham, Warwick, Wells (Somerset), Wenlock, Weymouth, Whitchurch (Hampshire), Wigan, Wilton, Winchester, Windsor, Wisbech, Wokingham, Woodstock, Wootton Bassett, Worcester, Wycombe
- Great Yarmouth, Yarmouth (Isle of Wight), York

=== Wales ===
- Aberystwyth
- Cardiff
- Cardigan
- Cefnllys
- Flint
- Haverfordwest
- Lampeter
- Mawddwy
- Neath
- Pembroke
- Swansea
- Tenby

== Reform and replacement ==
The tendency for the close corporation to treat the members of the governing body as the only corporators, and to repudiate the idea that the corporation was answerable to the inhabitants of the borough if the corporate property was squandered, became more and more manifest as the history of the past slipped into oblivion. The corporators came to regard themselves as members of a club, legally warranted in dividing the lands and goods of the same among themselves whensoever such a division should seem profitable. Even where the constitution of the corporation was not close by charter, the franchise tended to become restricted to an ever-dwindling electorate, as the old methods for the extension of the municipal franchise by other means than inheritance died out of use. At Ipswich in 1833 the "freemen" numbered only one fifty-fifth of the population. If the electorate was increased, it was done so by the wholesale admission to borough freedom (burgess status) to voters willing to vote as directed by the corporation at parliamentary elections. The corporation of Louth before the 1830s reforms for example was the governing body of its grammar school which was the major endowed landowner in the town. Growth of boroughs' corruption continued unchecked (but sometimes a little side-stepped see below) until the era of the Reform Act 1832. Several boroughs had by that time become insolvent, and some had recourse to their member of Parliament to eke out their revenues. In Buckingham the mayor received the whole town revenue without rendering account; sometimes, however, heavy criminal charges fell upon the officers.

Before the Reform era dissatisfaction came to occasional fruition in local acts of Parliament which placed under the authority of special commissioners a variety of administrative details, which if the corporation had not been suspected would certainly not have been assigned to its care. The trust offered another convenient means of escape from difficulty, and in some towns out of the trust was developed a system of municipal administration where there was no recognised corporation. Thus at Peterborough the feoffees who had succeeded to the control of certain ancient charities constituted a form of town council with very restricted powers. In the 17th century Sheffield was brought under the act "to redress the misemployment of lands given to charitable uses", and the municipal administration of what had been a borough passed into the hands of the trustees of the Burgery or Town Trust. The many special authorities created under act of Parliament, such as improvement commissioners, led to much confusion, conflict and overlapping, and increased the need for a general reform.

The reform of the boroughs was treated as part of the question of parliamentary reform. The Reform Act 1832 abolished the exclusive privileges of the corporations in parliamentary elections and enfranchised male occupiers; the question of the municipal franchise was next dealt with. In effect this made the borough parliamentary franchise the same as the county franchise. In 1833 a commission inquired into the administration of the municipal corporations, the commissioners found far more corporations than parliamentary boroughs, many of which had fallen into desuetude or were purely nominal if not moribund. Those that were active were essentially oligarchies of a closed number of families, there were a few exceptions whereby the councils were elected by all the local residents or those born there. The majority were not representative of the inhabitants. The result of the inquiry was the Municipal Corporations Act 1835 (5 & 6 Will. 4. c. 76), which gave the municipal franchise to the ratepayers, but also allowed the freemen to remain on the roll. In all the municipal corporations dealt with by the act, the town council came to consist of a mayor, aldermen and councillors, and the councils were given like powers, being divided into those with and those without a commission of the peace. The commissions of the peace were also an instrument of reform. Many boroughs had borough courts of the previous oligarchies of mayor and aldermen, advised by a recorder, these were abolished with the magistrates being appointed as in the counties – many indeed were supposedly 'county boroughs'. This reform was as crucial as that of the constitution of the council itself.

The minutes were to be open to the inspection of any burgess, and an audit of accounts was required. Exclusive rights of retail trading, which in some towns were restricted to freemen of the borough, or to specialist guilds and companies (similar to those of the London livery companies), were abolished. The system of police, which in some places was still medieval in character as a town watch, was modernised along the lines of the Peel reforms for constabulary placed under the control of the council. The various privileged areas within the bounds of a borough were with few exceptions made part of the borough. The powers of the council to alienate corporate property were closely restricted. The operations of the act were extended by later legislation, and the diverse amendments and enactments which followed were consolidated in the Municipal Corporations Act 1882 (45 & 46 Vict. c. 50).

== See also ==
- County corporate
- Liberty (division)
- Burh
- Rotten and pocket boroughs
