= Corporation of Congleton =

The Corporation of Congleton was the civic organisation for Congleton established by charter by Henry de Lacy in 1271/2. This charter bestowed a range of rights:

- to elect a mayor and ale taster
- to have a merchant guild
- to behead known felons

== Mayors of Congleton ==
- 1637 John Bradshawe
