= Justice of Chester =

Chief judicial authority for the county palatine of Chester

The Justice of Chester was the chief judicial authority for the county palatine of Chester, from the establishment of the county until the abolition of the Great Sessions in Wales and the palatine judicature in 1830.

Within the County Palatine (which encompassed Cheshire, the City of Chester, and Flintshire), the Justice enjoyed the jurisdiction possessed in England by the Court of Common Pleas and the King's Bench. While the legal reorganisation of Wales and the Marches under Henry VIII diminished the authority of the Earl of Chester (i.e., the Prince of Wales) in the County Palatine, the authority of the Justice was, in fact, increased. In 1542, the Great Sessions were established in Wales, that country being divided into four circuits of three shires each. Denbighshire, Flintshire, and Montgomeryshire were made part of the Chester circuit, over which the Justice presided. Under Elizabeth I, a second justice was added to each of the Welsh circuits, after which the senior and junior justice are generally referred to as the Chief Justice of Chester and the Second or Puisne Justice of Chester.

Because the Cheshire justices were free to practise as barristers in the English courts or sit in Parliament, the post of Chief Justice was often awarded as a form of patronage by the Government to aspiring lawyers. The offices of Chief and Puisne Justice were abolished in 1830, as part of reforms that also brought Wales under the jurisdiction of the courts at Westminster.

== Justices of Chester ==
- Philip Orreby 1202–29
- John de Grey c.1246
- William de Vernon 1229–?1236
- Richard de Vernon
- Earl of Lincoln
- John Lestrange 1241-1245
- John Grey 1245-1249
- Alan la Zouche 1250–1255
- Gilbert Talbot 1255–
- Roger de Montalt/Mohaut (aka Mold) 1258–1259
- Fulk de Orreby 1259–1261
- Thomas de Orreby 1261–1262
- William la Zouche 1262–
- Luke de Thaney c.1265
- James de Audley c.1265
- Reginald de Grey, 1st Baron Grey de Wilton c.1270
- Robert de Ufford c.1276–
- Guncelin Badelesmere 1276-79
- Reginald de Grey, 1st Baron Grey de Wilton 1281-1290
- Reginald de Grey, 1st Baron Grey de Wilton c.1297
- Richard Massy c.1300
- Robert Holland, 1st Baron Holand c.1307–c.1320
- Pain de Tibetot c.1311
- Richard Daumary c.1325
- William de Clinton, 1st Earl of Huntingdon c.1330
- Hugh de Freyne c.1335
- Henry Ferrers, 2nd Baron Ferrers of Groby 1336–1342
- Thomas de Felton 1369–1381
- Sir John Holland 1381–1385
- Edmund of Langley, 1st Duke of York 1385–1387
- Robert de Vere, Duke of Ireland 1387–1388
- Thomas of Woodstock, 1st Duke of Gloucester 1388–1391
- John Holland, 1st Duke of Exeter 1391–1394
- Thomas de Mowbray, 1st Duke of Norfolk 1394–1398
- William le Scrope, 1st Earl of Wiltshire 1398–1399
- Henry Percy 1400–1403
- Gilbert Talbot, 5th Baron Talbot 1403–1419
- Thomas Beaufort, Duke of Exeter 1420–1427
- Humphrey, Duke of Gloucester 1427–1440
- William de la Pole, 1st Duke of Suffolk 1440–1450 (jointly from 1443, murdered 1450))
- Thomas Stanley, 1st Baron Stanley 1443–1459 (jointly to 1450)
- John Talbot, 2nd Earl of Shrewsbury 1459–1460 (KIA 1460)
- in commission 1460
- John Needham 1461
- Thomas Stanley, 1st Earl of Derby 1461–1471
- Richard, Duke of Gloucester 1471
- Thomas Stanley, 1st Earl of Derby 1471–1504
- Sir Thomas Englefield 1505–1514?
- Sir Nicholas Hare 1540–1545
- Sir Robert Townshend 1545–1557
- Sir John Pollard 1557
- George Wood Esq.1558 of Hall atte Wood, Balterley, Staffordshire
- John Throckmorton 1558–1578
- Sir George Bromley 1564–1589
- Richard Shuttleworth 1589–1592
- Sir Richard Lewknor 1592–1616

== Chief and Puisne Justices of Chester ==
| Year | Chief Justice | Puisne Justice |
|---|---|---|
| 1603 | Sir Richard Lewknor | Henry Townshend |
| 1616 | Sir Thomas Chamberlayne | Henry Townshend |
| 1620 | Sir James Whitelocke | Henry Townshend |
| 1624 | Sir Thomas Chamberlayne | Henry Townshend |
| 1625 | Sir John Bridgeman | Marmaduke Lloyd |
| 1636 | Sir John Bridgeman | Richard Prytherg |
| 1638 | Sir Thomas Milward | Richard Prytherg |
| 1648 | John Bradshaw | Peter Warburton |
| 1649 | John Bradshaw | Thomas Fell |
| 1660 | Timothy Turner | Thomas Fell |
| 1661 | Sir Geoffrey Palmer, Bt | Robert Milward |
| 1662 | Sir Job Charlton | Robert Milward |
| 1674 | Sir Job Charlton | George Johnson |
| 1680 | Sir George Jeffreys | George Johnson |
| 1681 | Sir George Jeffreys | John Warren |
| 1684 | Sir Edward Herbert | John Warren |
| 1686 | Sir Edward Lutwyche | John Warren |
| 1686 | Sir Job Charlton | John Warren |
| 1689 | Sir John Trenchard | Lyttelton Powis |
| 1690 | John Coombe | Lyttelton Powis |
| 1696 | John Coombe | Salathiel Lovel |
| 1697 | Joseph Jekyll | Salathiel Lovel |
| 1707 | Joseph Jekyll | John Pocklington |
| 1711 | Joseph Jekyll | John Warde |
| 1714 | Joseph Jekyll | Edward Jeffreys |
| 1717 | Spencer Cowper | Edward Jeffreys |
| 1726 | Spencer Cowper | John Willes |
| 1729 | Sir John Willes | William Jessop |
| 1734 | John Verney | Richard Potenger |
| 1738 | Matthew Skinner | Richard Potenger |
| 1740 | Matthew Skinner | John Talbot |
| 1749 | William Noel | John Talbot |
| 1756 | William Noel | Taylor White |
| 1762 | John Morton | Taylor White |
| 1771 | John Morton | John Skynner |
| 1777 | John Morton | Francis Buller |
| 1778 | John Morton | Daines Barrington |
| 1780 | Lloyd Kenyon | Daines Barrington |
| 1784 | Richard Pepper Arden | Daines Barrington |
| 1788 | Edward Bearcroft | Francis Burton |
| 1796 | James Adair | Francis Burton |
| 1798 | William Grant | Francis Burton |
| 1799 | James Mansfield | Francis Burton |
| 1804 | Vicary Gibbs | Francis Burton |
| 1805 | Robert Dallas | Francis Burton |
| 1813 | Richard Richards | Francis Burton |
| 1814 | Sir William Garrow | Francis Burton |
| 1815 | Sir William Garrow | William Draper Best |
| 1816 | Sir William Garrow | Samuel Marshall |
| 1817 | John Leach | Thomas Jervis |
| 1818 | William Draper Best | Thomas Jervis |
| 1818 | John Copley | Thomas Jervis |
| 1819 | Charles Warren | Thomas Jervis |

Offices abolished 1830

== Bibliography ==
- Yates, Joseph Brooks (1856). The Rights and Jurisdiction of the County Palatine of Chester, the Earls Palatine, the Chamberlain, and Other Officers. Charles Simms & Co.
- The Penny Cyclopedia of the Society for the Dissemination of Useful Knowledge, Volume XXVI. London: Charles Knight & Co. 1843.
