= Listed buildings in Warburton, Greater Manchester =

Warburton is a civil parish in the Metropolitan Borough of Trafford, Greater Manchester, England. It contains 22 listed buildings that are recorded in the National Heritage List for England. Of these, one is listed at Grade I, the highest of the three grades, and the others are at Grade II, the lowest grade. The parish contains the village of Warburton, and is otherwise rural. Most of the listed buildings are houses, farmhouses and farm buildings. The other listed buildings include churches and associated structures, a war memorial, and an enclosure containing stocks and a cross base, with its wall also listed.

== Key ==
Grade	Criteria
I	Buildings of exceptional interest, sometimes considered to be internationally important
II	Buildings of national importance and special interest

== Buildings ==
Name and location	Photograph	Date	Notes	Grade
Barn, Heathlands Farm; 53.40745°N 2.43476°W	—	15th to 16th century	A cruck barn, later altered and extended, it is in brick with a slate roof. There are three bays, outshuts at both ends, and pigsties at the south end. There are various openings, some blocked. Inside are two complete crucks.	II
Old Church of Saint Werburg; 53.40215°N 2.45729°W		Late 16th century	The church was extended in the 17th century, and the sanctuary and tower date from 1711. It is partly timber framed, partly in sandstone and partly in brick, and has a roof of Kerridge stone-slate. The church consists of a nave, north and south aisles, a chancel and vestry, and a tower at the east end. The tower has a doorway with a semicircular head and a dated keystone, above it at the east end is an oval window, the bell openings are round-headed, and on the summit are six pinnacles. The windows are mullioned. The church is now redundant.	I
The Bent Farmhouse; 53.39847°N 2.44649°W	—	1600	The farmhouse was considerably restored in 1880 by John Douglas. It is basically timber framed on a stone plinth, the front is in brick with terracotta dressings, there is brick nogging at the rear, and the roof has clay tiles. There are two storeys and a projecting cross-wing with five bays to its left and two to the right. The windows are mullioned, above them is a continuous hood mould, and on the upper floor is decorative brickwork. The porch is gabled with a decorative bressumer and finials. Inside there is an inglenook and bressumer.	II
Barn, Bent Farm; 53.39822°N 2.44686°W		c. 1600 (possible)	The barn is in brick on a stone plinth, it is cruck framed, and has a tile roof replacing a thatched roof. There are two storeys, three bays, a lean-to at the rear, and a three-bay cart shed at the right. The barn contains doors and dormer loft hatches. Inside are four largely complete crucks.	II
Building west of Villa Farmhouse; 53.40086°N 2.43842°W	—	Late 16th or early 17th century	Originally a farmhouse, later used for other purposes, it was first timber framed, later in the century it was partly rebuilt in sandstone, and in the 18th century largely replaced in brick. There are two storeys and a lean-to at the rear. The windows are casements. Inside there are timber framed partitions with wattle and daub infill, and 16th-century wall paintings.	II
Barn, Overtown Farm; 53.40037°N 2.44801°W	—	17th century	The barn is timber framed with brick nogging on a stone plinth, with some rebuilding in brick, and a slate roof. It has two storeys and five bays. The barn contains a large doorway, a first-floor loading door, and diamond-shaped honeycomb vents.	II
Stocks; 53.40200°N 2.45428°W	—	17th century (possible)	The stocks were restored in about 1900. They consist of two square stone posts with projecting plinths and semicircular heads. The foot restraints have been replaced, and repaired by iron cramps.	II
Farm building, Warburton Park Farm; 53.40778°N 2.45055°W	—	17th century	The farm building was originally timber framed on a stone plinth, with brick nogging and a slate roof, and two sides have been rebuilt in brick. It has a single storey and two bays. On the roof is a weathervane.	II
Wigsey Farmhouse; 53.40168°N 2.45174°W	—	17th century	The farmhouse was later extended and altered. It is in brick on a stone plinth, with two storeys, three bays, and a wing and a lean-to at the rear. On the front is a 19th-century porch, most of the windows are casements, and incorporated in the rear is a 17th-century mullioned window. Inside there is a cruck and a bressumer.	II
Paddocklake Farmhouse; 53.40165°N 2.45012°W	—	1717	A brick farmhouse with a clay tile roof, it has two storeys, two bays, and a rear wing. There is a central doorway flanked by brick buttresses, and the windows are three-light replacement casements. Inside there is an inglenook and a bressumer.	II
Barn, Birch Farm; 53.40843°N 2.42149°W	—	18th century	The barn incorporates cruck frames dating from the 17th century or earlier. It is in brick with a slate roof, and consists of a long range mainly in one storey, with an open bay to the right, and a two-storey wing at the front. The barn contains doorways, casement windows, dormers, and diamond-shaped honeycomb vents. Inside are two full crucks.	II
Shippon, Wigsey Farm; 53.40171°N 2.45218°W	—	18th century	A range of farm buildings incorporating earlier crucks, it is in brick with a slate roof, two storeys, and an L-shaped plan. The older north wing contains an owl hole and a datestone, and inside are two cruck trusses.	II
Sundial; 53.40209°N 2.45741°W	—	1765	The sundial is in the churchyard of Old Church of Saint Werburg to the southwest of the church. It is in stone and consists of a baluster-type shaft with a square head and base. On the top are a copper dated dial and a gnomon.	II
Heathlands Farmhouse; 53.40734°N 2.43495°W	—	Late 18th century	A brick farmhouse on a stone plinth with a slate roof, it has two storeys, a double-depth plan, and a later garage to the right. There is a central porch, and the windows have segmental brick arches with keystones, and contain casements.	II
Stone flag wall 53.40204°N 2.45438°W	—	18th or 19th century	The wall partly encloses the area occupied by the stocks and the cross base. It consists of sandstone slabs measuring about 1 metre (3 ft 3 in) by 0.5 metres (1 ft 8 in), set vertically and held together by iron cramps. The top edge is chamfered, and the wall runs for about 25 metres (82 ft).	II
The School; 53.39906°N 2.43605°W	—	1871–72	A school designed by John Douglas, later a private house, it is in brick with dressings in terracotta and stone, and has a clay tile roof. There are two storeys, three bays, and a rear wing. On the front is a projecting chimneystack with decorative brick work, flanked by seven-light mullioned windows, and to the right is a dormer gable with lozenge decoration. The porch has a hipped roof, and there is a bellcote also with a hipped roof. Inside there are two pairs of truncated crucks.	II
St Werburgh's Church; 53.39840°N 2.44544°W		1882–85	The church, designed by John Douglas is in sandstone with a clay tile roof. It consists of a nave, a north aisle, a chancel, and a northeast tower. The tower has three stages, with diagonal buttresses, and an embattled parapet with crocketed pinnacles on the corners. Above the main doorway is a niche for a statue, and on a buttress between the nave and the chancel is a sundial.	II
Lychgate; 53.40215°N 2.45671°W		1887	The lychgate is at the entrance to the churchyard of Old Church of Saint Werburg. It is in timber and has a stone-slate roof with a cross finial. The lychgate contains a pair of wooden gates, and there is an inscription on the beam.	II
Church House; 53.39864°N 2.44545°W		1889	Parish rooms and a caretaker's house designed by John Douglas, the building is in brick with sandstone dressings and a clay tile roof. It has a T-shaped plan, two storeys, a four-bay front, a lean-to at the left, and a rear wing. The left bay forms a cross-wing with a gable containing lozenge panels, and with carved bargeboards and finials. In the third bay is a dormer, the windows are mullioned, most also with transoms, between the bays are buttresses, and between the floors is a decorative lozenge band. The doorway has a moulded surround and a dated lintel.	II
Post Office House; 53.39978°N 2.43840°W	—	1893	A brick house designed by John Douglas, it has terracotta dressings and a slate roof. There are two storeys, an L-shaped plan, and three bays, the right wing projecting as a gabled wing. The porch is timber framed, and the windows are mullioned, some also with transoms. There is decorative brickwork on the upper floor and in the gable.	II
War memorial 53.39837°N 2.44571°W		1920	The war memorial is in the churchyard of St Werburgh's Church. It is in Aberdeen granite, and has a simple Celtic cross-style design. The cross is set on a tapering square base and a square plinth. On the base are inscriptions and the names of those lost in the two World Wars.	II
Cross base 53.40200°N 2.45432°W	—	Unknown	The cross base is in stone. Five large steps surround four sides of the cross base, which contains a square socket for a cross.	II
