= Timothy Turner =

English judge

Sir Timothy Turner SL JP (11 July 1585 – January 1677) was an English judge.

Turner was the eldest son of the Shropshire barrister Thomas Turner. He was a member of Staple Inn and then joined Gray's Inn on 8 March 1607, being called to the bar on 30 October 1611. In the contemporary debates between Sir Edward Coke and Lord Chancellor Ellesmere, Turner's notebooks reveal him to have felt a strong reaction against Ellesmere's claims for the royal prerogative as "transcendent to the common law".

His initial practice was centered on Ludlow, the legal center of Wales and the Marches, but he was of little note officially until 1626, when he became a justice of the peace for Shropshire, through the influence either of Sir Thomas Coventry, or Ellesmere's son and heir the Earl of Bridgewater. (Turner's second wife was the widow of Bridgewater's late solicitor.)

A commissioner in Shropshire for the forced loan of 1626, Turner was subsequently king's solicitor before the Council of the Marches from 1627 to 1637, and a master in chancery extraordinary from 1630. He became a bencher of Gray's Inn in 1632. His first judicial appointment came in 1634, when he was made puisne judge for the North Wales circuit, and in 1637, became chief justice of South Wales. He became recorder of Shrewsbury in 1638.

In 1642, it was reported to the House of Commons that Turner and the mayor of Shrewsbury had placed a declaration before the grand jury which declared the Commissions of Array legitimate and included a promise to defend the King as well as the laws and privileges of Parliament. While Turner later claimed that he had been forced to take this position due to the strength of the Royalist party in Shropshire — and several members of his household, including his son, joined the Parliamentary cause — he was stripped of his offices by the end of 1645 and forced to compound with Parliament.

During the Interregnum, Turner reflected in 1658 that the conflict between Coke and Ellesmere "overthrew all at Last and brought the whole nation...into that slavery". However, upon the Restoration, Turner's passivity during the Interregnum was rewarded. He was made Chief Justice of Chester in 1660, restored to the recordership of Shrewsbury from 1660 until 1670, and a serjeant-at-law in 1669. He was knighted in 1670, and died in January 1677 aged 91.

Legal offices
Preceded by John Bradshaw	Chief Justice of Chester; 1660–1661	Succeeded by Sir Geoffrey Palmer, Bt
