= Wyberslegh Hall =

House in Stockport, Greater Manchester, England

Coordinates: 53.365407°N 2.058357°W

Wyberslegh Hall (sometimes spelled Wybersley Hall) is a large house dating from the 16th century, on the edge of the village of High Lane in Greater Manchester, England. Now in private ownership, Wyberslegh Hall was formerly the home of eldest sons of the Bradshaw family. Of unusual design, it has castellated gables. The author Christopher Isherwood was born there.

The hall was designated a Grade II listed building in 1967.
