= Werburgh =

Anglo-Saxon saint

Saint Werburgh
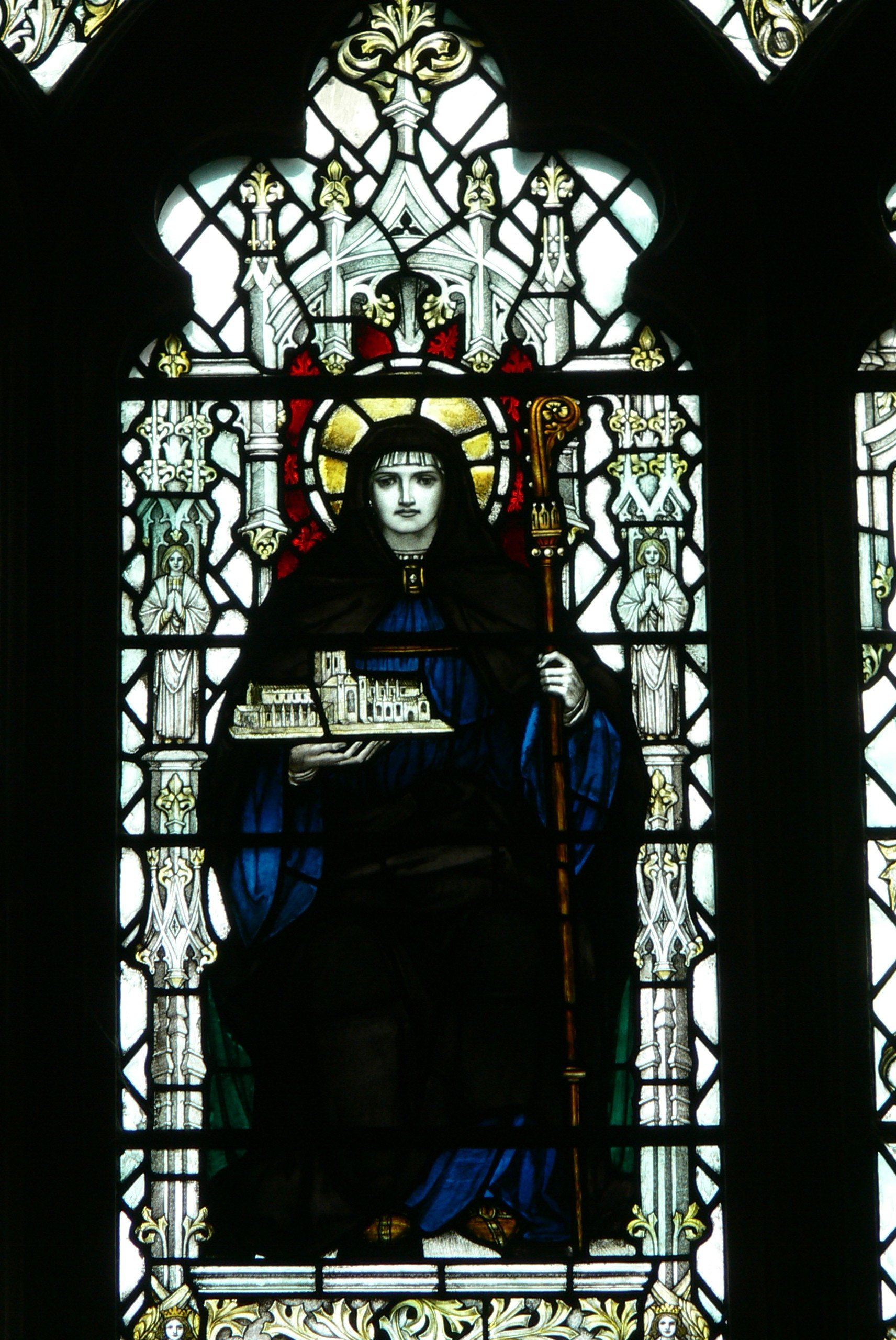
- Saint Werburgh, Chester Cathedral.
- Born: c. 650; Stone, Mercia
- Died: 3 February 700; Trentham, Staffordshire, England
- Venerated in: Catholic Church; Anglican Communion; Eastern Orthodox Church
- Major shrine: Hanbury then Chester Cathedral
- Feast: 3 February
- Patronage: Chester

Werburgh (also Wærburh, Werburh, Werburga, meaning "true city"; Latin: Vereburga; c. AD 650 – 3 February 700) was an Anglo-Saxon princess who became the patron saint of the city of Chester in Cheshire. Her feast day is 3 February.

== Life ==
Werburgh was born at Stone (now in Staffordshire), and was the daughter of King Wulfhere of Mercia (himself the Christian son of the pagan King Penda of Mercia) and his wife Ermenilda, herself daughter of the King of Kent. She obtained her father's consent to enter the Abbey of Ely, which had been founded by her great-aunt Etheldreda (or Audrey), the first Abbess of Ely and former queen of Northumbria, whose fame was widespread. Werburgh was trained at home by Chad (afterwards Bishop of Lichfield), and by her mother; and in the cloister by her aunt and grandmother. Werburgh was a nun for most of her life. During some of her life she was resident in Weedon Bec, Northamptonshire.

Werburgh was instrumental in convent reform across England. She eventually succeeded her mother Ermenilda, her grandmother Seaxburh, and great-aunt Etheldreda as fourth Abbess of Ely. She died on 3 February 700 and was buried at Hanbury in Staffordshire.

== Veneration ==
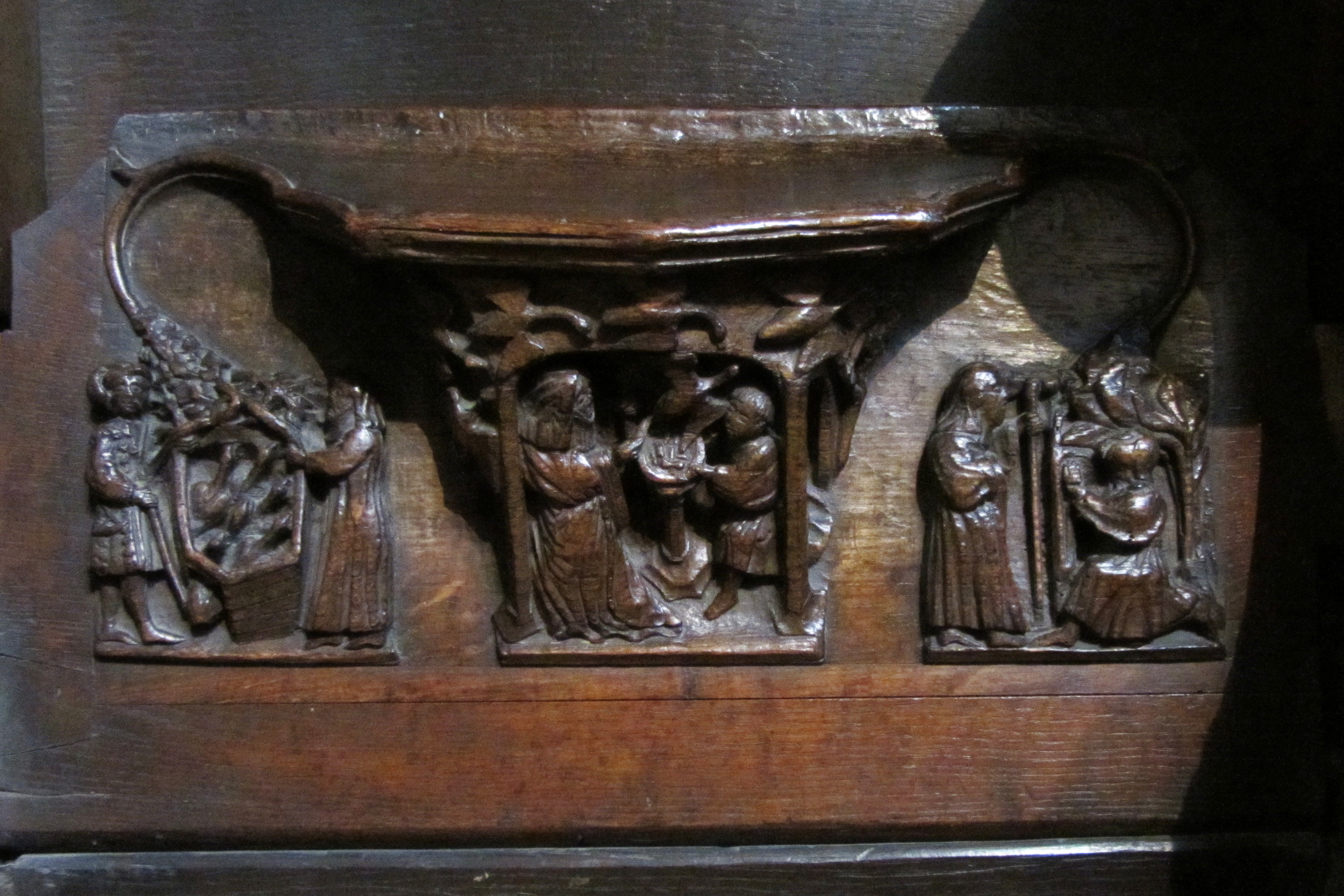
Miracles of St Werburgh, including the resurrection of the goose, depicted on a misericord at Chester Cathedral

Following Werburgh's death, her brother Coenred became king of Mercia. In 708 he decided to move his sister's remains to a more conspicuous place within the church at Hanbury. When the tomb was opened, her body was found to be miraculously intact. This preservation was taken as a sign of divine favour. A year later Coenred had abdicated as king and taken holy orders, becoming a monk in Rome. It was at this time that the most famous story about Werburgh appeared, according to which she restored a dead goose to life after it had been eaten, as recounted by the medieval hagiographer Goscelin. A stained glass window in the Church of St Peter and St Paul, Weedon Bec, relates to another tale in which she was said to have banished all the geese from the village.

The shrine of St Werberh remained at Hanbury until the threat from Danish Viking raids in the late 9th century prompted their relocation to within the walled city of Chester. A shrine to St Werberh was established at the Church of St Peter and St Paul (the site is now occupied by Chester Cathedral). In 975, the Church of St Peter and St Paul was re-dedicated to St Werburgh and the Northumbrian saint Oswald. A monastery in the names of these two saints was attached to the church in the 11th century.

By 1057 the Abbey church was rebuilt and further endowed by Leofric, Earl of Mercia. By this time, Werburgh was regarded as the patron saint and protector of Chester. A miracle attributed to her was the unexpected withdrawal of the Welsh king Gruffudd ap Llywelyn from besieging the city.

Even after 1066 and the Norman Conquest of England, the shrine of St Werburgh was a place of veneration. In 1093, Hugh d'Avranches, the second Norman Earl of Chester, presented gifts of property to the abbey and had the church enlarged and rebuilt. He also established a Benedictine monastery. Its monks came from Bec Abbey in Normandy, which had provided the first two post-Conquest Archbishops of Canterbury: Lanfranc and Anselm. Like many other Anglo-Norman barons, Hugh d'Avranches entered the monastery shortly before he died and, in turn, was buried there. During the Middle Ages, the badge of a gaggle of geese was adopted as proof of having made a pilgrimage to the Shrine of St Werburgh.

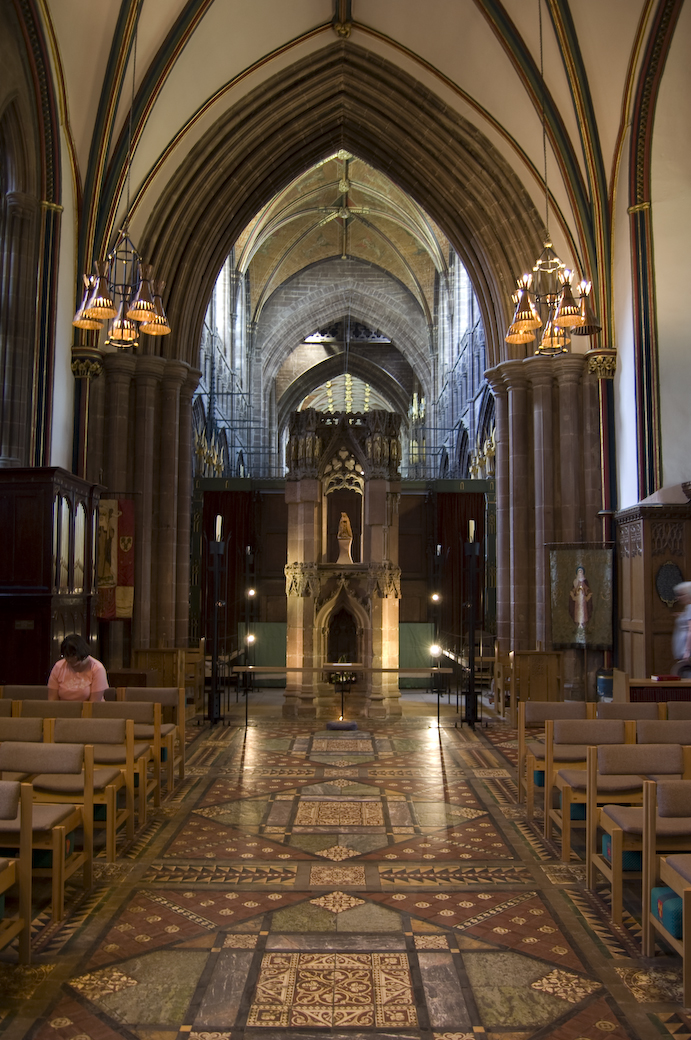
The reassembled shrine at the back of the Lady Chapel

In 1540 the dissolution of the abbey led to the creation of Chester Cathedral, which was rededicated to Christ and the Blessed Virgin Mary. Although an elaborate shrine had been constructed in the 14th century to Werburgh, this was broken up at the time of the Dissolution. Werburgh's relics were lost. Parts of the shrine's stonework that survived were reassembled in 1876. The shrine remains on display in the cathedral's Lady Chapel at the back of the main nave.

== Today ==
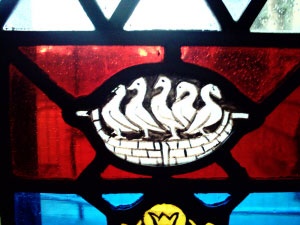
St Werburgh's pilgrimage badge, showing a gaggle of geese

St Werburgh remains the patron saint of Chester. Her feast day is 3 February.

At least ten churches in England, and some overseas, are dedicated to St Werburgh, including those in Dublin, Derby, Stoke-on-Trent and Spondon. The village of Warburton in Greater Manchester (previously Cheshire) is named after its parish church of St Werburgh, and a neighbourhood in Bristol is named St Werburghs after its church (now a climbing centre). The Kent village of Hoo St Werburgh is the largest on the Hoo Peninsula. The Manchester Metrolink line to East Didsbury has St Werburgh's Road, at the crossroads with Wilbraham Road where there is a church dedicated to St Werburgh.

== See also ==
- St Werburgh's Church (disambiguation)
