= Warburton School =

- Location in Greater Manchester
- 53.3998°N 2.4384°W
- Location: Warburton, Greater Manchester, England

History
- Built: 1871–72
- Built for: Rowland Egerton-Warburton

Site notes
- Architect: John Douglas

Listed Building – Grade II
- Official name: The School
- Designated: 12 July 1985
- Reference no.: 1356531

Warburton School is on the south side of Dunham Road in the village of Warburton, Greater Manchester, England. It has been converted into a house and is recorded in the National Heritage List for England as a designated Grade II listed building.

The school was built in 1871–72 for the landowner Rowland Egerton-Warburton of Arley Hall, and was designed by the Chester architect John Douglas. It is constructed in brick with stone and terracotta dressings, and has a tiled roof. The building has three bays; from the left, the first two bays contain seven-light mullioned windows. Above the window in the central bay is a dormer gable that contains a three-light mullioned window. The right bay contains a modern patio window. Between the left and central bays is a decorated brick chimney stack. Above the main roof is a hipped bellcote. In the interior of the building are two pairs of truncated crucks supporting the roof.

== See also ==
- Listed buildings in Warburton, Greater Manchester
- List of non-ecclesiastical and non-residential works by John Douglas
