= Peter Warburton (1588–1666) =

English barrister and judge

Peter Warburton (1588–1666) was an English barrister and judge.

== Life ==
The eldest son of Peter Warburton of Hefferston Grange, Cheshire, grandson of Sir Peter Warburton (d. 1550) of Arley in the same county, by Magdalen, daughter of Robert Moulton of St. Alban's, Wood Street, London, Auditor of the Exchequer in the reign of Elizabeth, he was born on 27 March 1588. At Oxford, where he matriculated at Brasenose College on 11 May 1604, he graduated B.A. on 22 November 1606. On 27 January 1607 he was admitted student at Lincoln's Inn, where he was called to the bar in 1612.

Warburton was one of the commissioners appointed on 1 February 1641 for the levy in Cheshire of the first two subsidies granted by the Long Parliament, and on 6 November 1645 was added to the committee of accounts. Parliament also appointed him on 22 February 1647 justice of the court of session of Cheshire and of the great sessions of Montgomeryshire, Denbighshire, and Flintshire, and advanced him on 12 June 1649 to a puisne judgeship in the Court of Common Pleas, having first (9 June) caused him to be invested with the coif. He was a member of the special commission which on 24 October of that year tried John Lilburne. On 14 March 1655 he was placed with Sir George Booth and Sir William Brereton on the militia commission for Cheshire. Soon afterwards he was transferred from the court of common pleas to the upper bench, in which he sat with Lord-chief-justice John Glynne on the trial (9 February 1657) of Miles Sindercombe.

Though pardoned at the Restoration of 1660, Warburton was not confirmed by a new call in the status of serjeant-at-law. He died on 28 February 1666, and was buried in the church of Fetcham, Surrey.

== Family ==
By his wife Alice, daughter of John Gardener of Himbleton, Worcestershire, Warburton left a son Robert.

== Notes ==
Attribution

This article incorporates text from a publication now in the public domain: Lee, Sidney, ed. (1899). "Warburton, Peter (1588-1666)". Dictionary of National Biography. Vol. 59. London: Smith, Elder & Co.
