= Warburton, Greater Manchester =

Coordinates: 53.403°N 2.455°W

Warburton
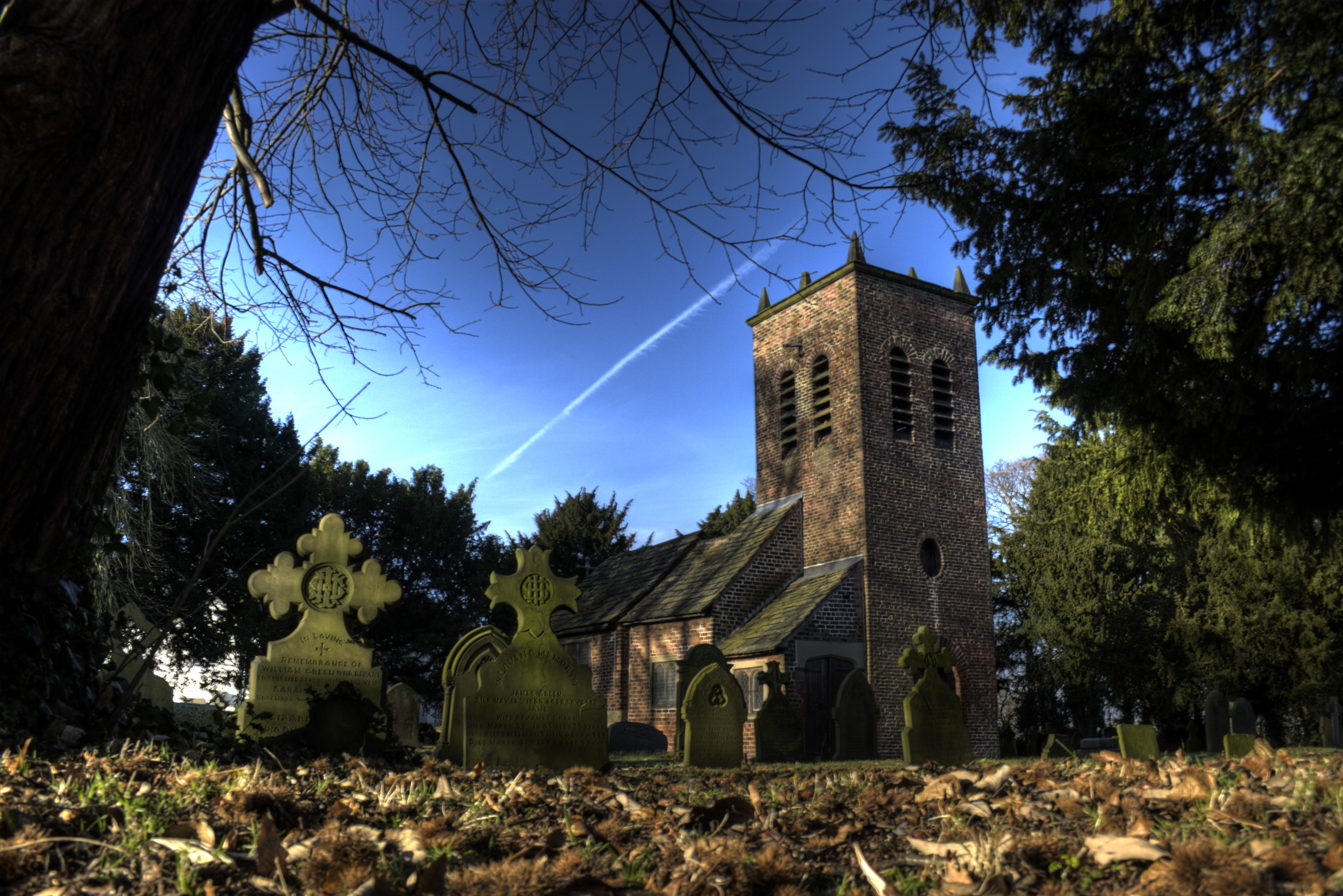
- St Werburgh's Church

- Location within Greater Manchester
- Population: 286 (2001 census)
- OS grid reference: SJ697896
- Metropolitan borough: Trafford
- Metropolitan county: Greater Manchester
- Region: North West
- Country: England
- Sovereign state: United Kingdom
- Post town: LYMM
- Postcode district: WA13
- Dialling code: 01925
- Police: Greater Manchester
- Fire: Greater Manchester
- Ambulance: North West
- UK Parliament: Altrincham and Sale West

Warburton is a village and civil parish in the Metropolitan Borough of Trafford, Greater Manchester, England. Historically in Cheshire, it lies on the south bank of the River Mersey. The village remains predominantly rural. Altrincham is the nearest town. At the 2001 census, the parish had a population of 286.

Warburton has a history of settlement from the 11th century. There are 22 listed buildings in the village, including the timber-framed Grade I Church of St Werburgh, which is at least 700 years old. Among the other listed buildings are examples of architect John Douglas's work, including the second Church of St Werburgh, built in 1883. In 2006, Time Team excavated land at Moss Brow Farm in Warburton, looking for a Roman fortlet. No evidence of a fortlet was found and the previously identified 'punic' ditch turned out to be the remains of an 18th-century hedgerow.

== History ==
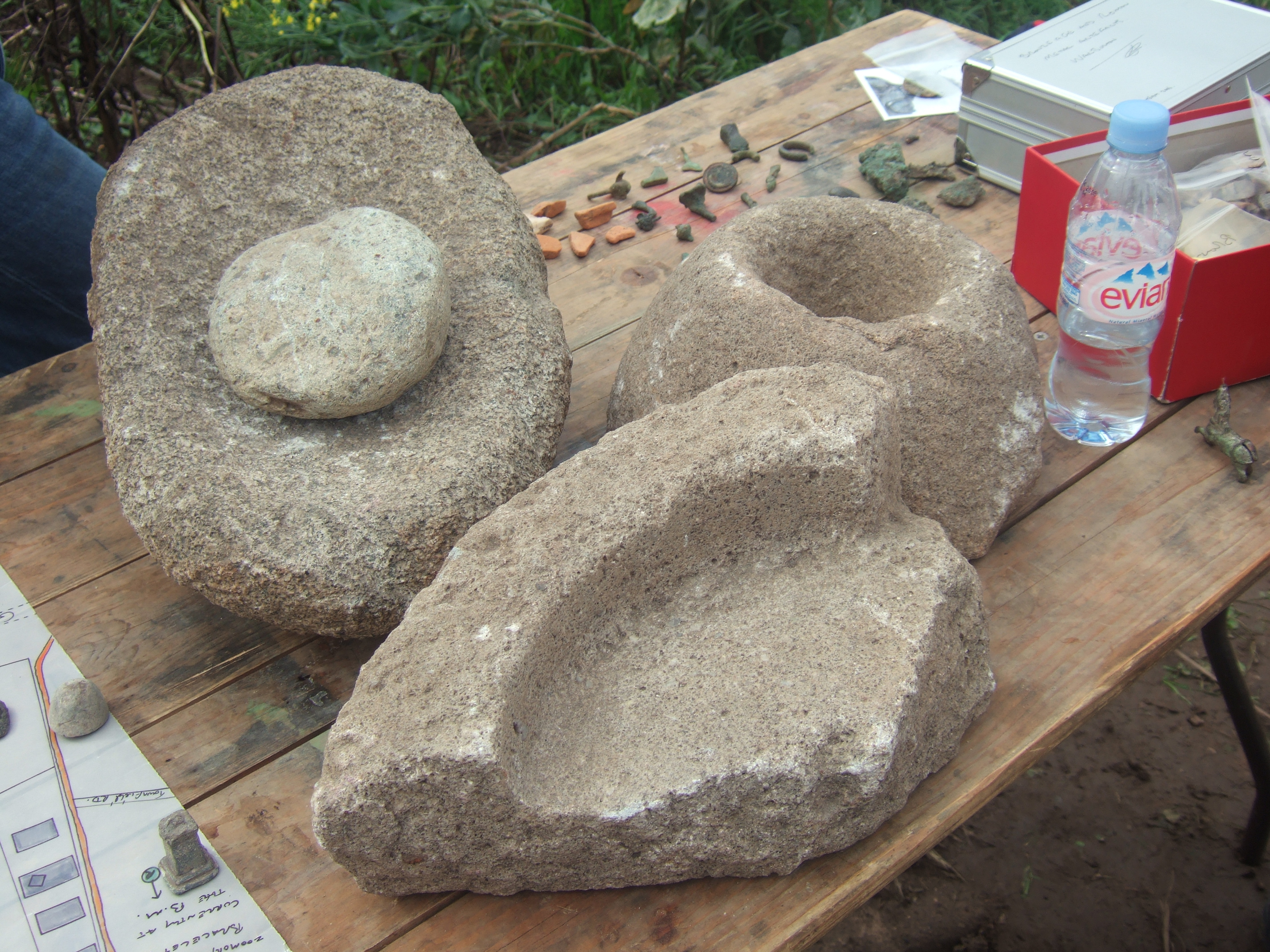
Quernstones found in Warburton

Some limited evidence has been found of activity on the site of Warburton dating from the Bronze Age, through the Iron Age and Roman periods; these include a flint blade, six Mesolithic tools, pieces of quernstone, and a snake bracelet. Archaeological evidence indicates that the area around Warburton has been used agriculturally since at least Roman times. In the Domesday Book, the name was Warburgtune. The suffix -ton means a settlement or farmstead in Old English, indicating that the settlement has pre-Conquest origins. It has been suggested that Warburton was the site of an Anglo-Saxon burgh or defended settlement, possibly called either "Toppingburgh" orWeard byrig, established by Aethelflaed, Queen of the Mercians, in 915 during the wars with the Vikings. However, it now seems likely that that site lay on the Wales–Cheshire border.

The earliest surviving documented reference to Warburton is in the Domesday Book, which recorded the two manors of Warburton; the manors were united by the late 12th century. Before the Norman Conquest, the area was controlled by the Anglo-Saxon thegn Aelfward. Although the Domesday Book records no church in Warburton, it is possible that the church dedicated to Saint Werburgh is pre-Conquest. The omission of the church may not be significant, as not all pre-Conquest churches or chapels were recorded in the Domesday survey. The earliest surviving documentary evidence of a church in Warburton is a deed of 1187, when it was a chapel of ease for the parish of Lymm. Warburton became a separate parish in the 13th century. The church is surrounded by a ditch and bank, probably dating back to at least the 14th century. Warburton is also the site of a medieval priory, near the Church of St Werburgh; although the priory was only formed in the 13th century, it was dissolved in 1270.

Warburton was predominantly a farming village during the medieval period. The north-western corner of the township was used as a deer park. Warburton grew as an agricultural town during the medieval period. It remained almost untouched by the Industrial Revolution; this is reflected in the population change between 1801 and 1901, from 466 to 403, showing a decrease at a time when the population of the rest of Trafford was growing considerably.

== Administration ==
The civil parish of Warburton was created in 1894, under the Local Government Act 1894, and has its own parish council. Warburton became part of the Metropolitan Borough of Trafford in 1974 upon the borough's creation, and was previously in Bucklow Rural District. The village is part of the Bowdon electoral ward; as of the 2012 local elections the councillors for the Bowdon ward are all Conservative. Warburton is in the Altrincham and Sale West constituency, which from its formation in 1997 was represented in the House of Commons by the Conservative MP Sir Graham Brady until he stood down at the 2024 general election, when it was taken by the present, Labour, MP, Connor Rand.

== Geography ==
The village of Lymm lies to the south-west of Warburton in the borough of Warrington, the River Bollin forming the border between the two villages. The Bollin joins the River Mersey in the village; however, the Mersey in Warburton has dried up, as it was diverted into the Manchester Ship Canal further upstream. To the east lie Dunham Town, Dunham Massey, Bowdon and Altrincham, with Little Bollington to the south, and Partington and Urmston to the north. The local geology is lower keuper marl, with a ridge of sand and gravel running from Warburton to Dunham.

== Transport ==
The main roads running through Warburton are the A6144 and the B5159. A local bus service, 5 (operated by Warrington Borough Transport), links Warburton with Warrington and Altrincham. Formerly, the 38 (operated by Warrington Coachways) also served the village.

== Demography ==
At the 2001 UK census, Warburton had a total population of 286. For every 100 females, there were 121.7 males. The average household size was 2.44. Of those aged 16–74 in Warburton, 43.2% had no academic qualifications or one GCSE, similar to the figures for Trafford as a whole (40.8%) and for England (45.5%). According to the census, 1.40% were unemployed and 33.49% were economically inactive. 16.43% of the population were under the age of 16 and 6.64% were aged 75 or over; the mean age of the people of Warburton was 43.03. 69.34% of residents described their health as 'good'.

Population change in Warburton since 1801
Year	1801	1811	1821	1831	1841	1851	1861	1871	1881	1891	1901	1911	1921	1931	1951	1961	1971	2001
Population	466	470	509	510	509	489	484	452	426	416	403	403	379	354	376	328	289	286

== Landmarks ==
=== Churches ===
Warburton has two churches of note. St Werburgh's (grid reference SJ 696 895) is a timber-framed church and a Grade I Listed Building, one of six in Trafford. Of the 29 timber-framed churches that survive in England and Wales, St Werburgh's is one of the oldest. The church dates back to at least the 14th century, and it may be built on the site of an earlier Saxon chapel. It is rarely used for worship but is accessible to visitors. The church features an early-17th-century font, a Jacobean pulpit, and a 1645 altar. Nearby are the remains of the old village cross, complete with stocks of which the wooden restraints are modern and the supporting pillars are much older. The other church in Warburton, also dedicated to St Werburgh, was built in 1883 by John Douglas and is a Grade II Listed Building. It is made of red sandstone and has a clay tile roof.

=== Grade II listed buildings ===
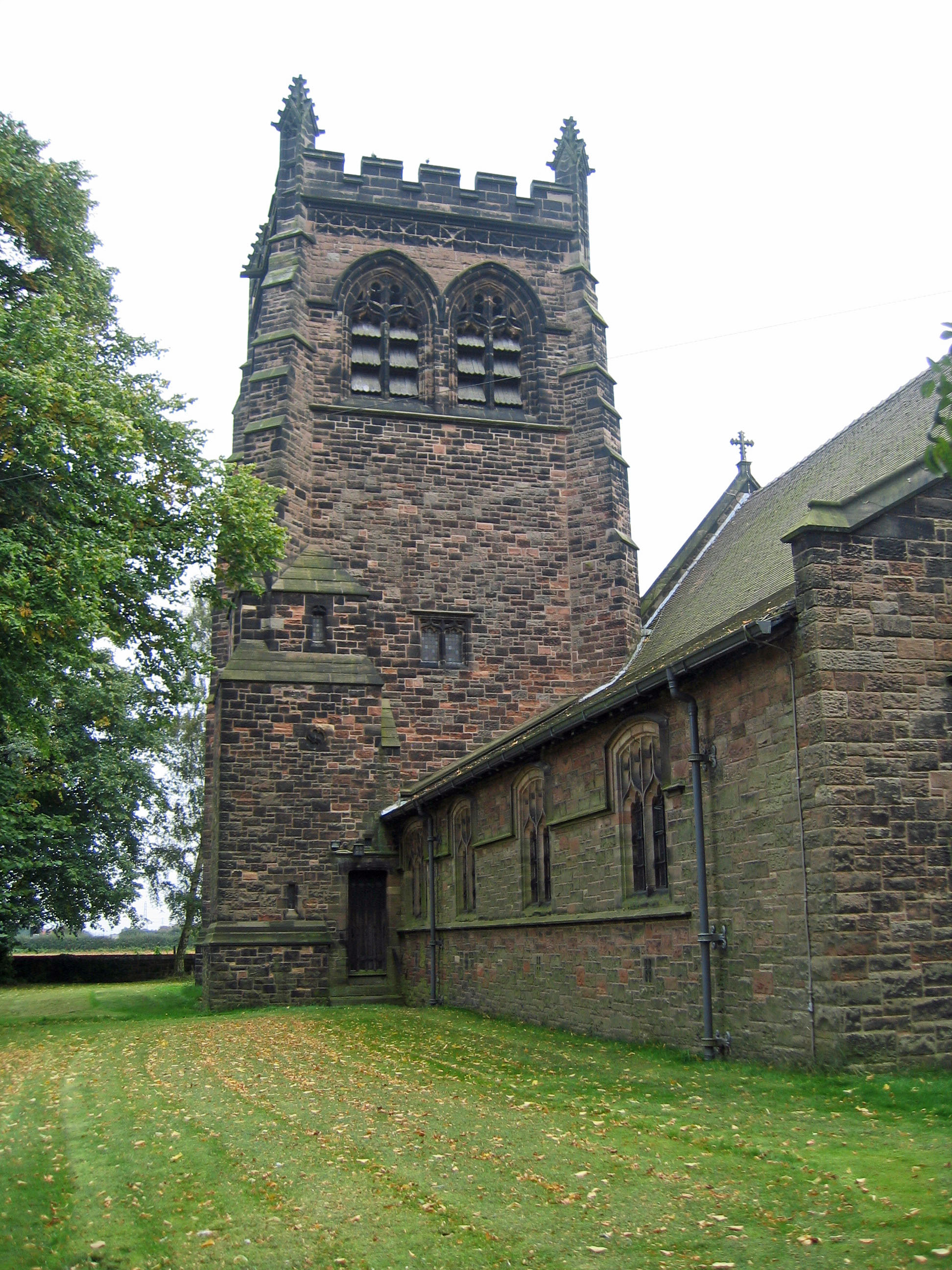
The new St Werburgh's Church is a Grade II listed building

As well as the later church dedicated to Saint Werburgh, there are 20 other Grade II listed buildings. The parish rooms and caretaker's house were built in 1889, and designed by John Douglas. Also built in the village by Douglas were the post office in 1893, and Warburton School in 1871–72; the latter has been converted to a residence but still features crucks supporting the roof. Some farm buildings in Warburton are also listed, including the farmhouse on Moss Lane. The barn is 18th-century but features crucks which may be 17th-century or earlier. The timber-framed farm building on Park Road is 17th-century in origin; the late-18th-century farmhouse on Warburton Lane was made with Flemish bond brick and has a slate roof. The barn on Paddock Lane dates from the 17th century. Also on Paddock Lane are two farmhouses: one was built in 1717 by Thomas Egerton and features an inglenook fireplace; the other, Wigsey Farmhouse, was built in the 17th century and has later additions, including a 19th-century porch. The building on Warburton Lane near Villa Farmhouse was originally a timber-framed building from the 16th or early 17th century. The house features late-16th- or early-17th-century frescos of a woman, possibly St Werburgh, with two geese and a rose.

There is the base of a stone cross on Townfield Lane, and wooden stocks nearby, probably dating from the 17th century. One of the more unusual listed structures in Warburton is the 25 m stretch of wall constructed from flagstones, probably built in the 18th or 19th century. There are two listed structures in the grounds of the old Church of St Werburgh: a lychgate from the late 19th century, and a sundial from 1765.

=== Warburton Toll Bridge ===
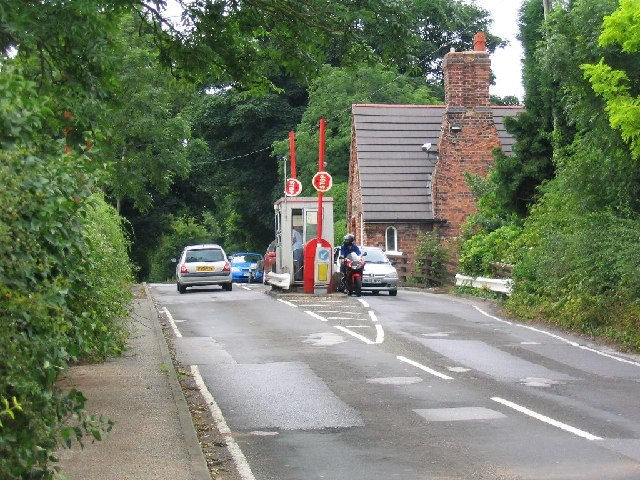
The toll booth on the 1863/4 Warburton Toll Bridge

Rixton and Warburton Bridge Act 1863
- Act of Parliament
- Parliament of the United Kingdom
- Long title: An Act for the making and maintaining of a Bridge over the River Mersey, to be called "Rixton and Warburton Bridge," with Roads thereto; and for other Purposes.
- Citation: 26 & 27 Vict. c. lxiii

Dates
- Royal assent: 8 June 1863

Text of statute as originally enacted

Rixton and Warburton Bridge Amendment Act 1867
- Act of Parliament
- Parliament of the United Kingdom
- Long title: An Act to enable the Rixton and Warburton Bridge Company to raise further Money, and to create Preference Shares; and for other Purposes.
- Citation: 30 & 31 Vict. c. xxxvii

Dates
- Royal assent: 31 May 1867

Text of statute as originally enacted

Locations
1 1863/4 Warburton Toll Bridge over a section of the River Mersey now drained.
2 1893 high level Warburton Toll Bridge over the Manchester Ship Canal.

Warburton Toll Bridge and Warburton Bridge Road form a privately owned statutory tolled undertaking carrying a public highway upon which tolls are payable. The high-level cantilever bridge crosses the Manchester Ship Canal on the B5159 road, connecting the A57 with the A6144, and was commissioned, in its earlier incarnation, under the Rixton and Warburton Bridge Act 1863 (26 & 27 Vict. c. lxiii). The original stone bridge spanned the River Mersey before its diversion into the Manchester Ship Canal, over which a new bridge was built. Section 29 of the Rixton and Warburton Bridge Act 1863 established that if the Mersey and Irwell Navigation was upgraded to allow sea-going vessels, then the Rixton and Warburton Bridge Company would be responsible for all costs, including its ongoing maintenance.

Both bridges and the unadopted approach roads are privately maintained. It is one of the few remaining pre-motorway toll bridges in the United Kingdom, and the only one in Greater Manchester.

It is sometimes incorrectly claimed that the tolls are payable only for crossing the now defunct original River Mersey bridge, but section 48 of the Rixton and Warburton Bridge Act 1863 makes the toll payable for "passing over, along or upon the Bridge and Roads, or any of them, or any part thereof". Section 9 of the Manchester Ship Canal (Various Powers) Act 1890 (53 & 54 Vict. c. ccxxvii) included the diversion of the original road and the new Ship Canal bridge within the scope of the toll charges.

Rixton and Warburton Bridge Order 2024
- Statutory Instrument
- Parliament of the United Kingdom
- Citation: SI 2024/630

Dates
- Made: 9 May 2024
- Commencement: 30 May 2024
Other legislation
Made under	Transport and Works Act 1992

Text of statute as originally enacted

The level of tolls was originally fixed, but can now be changed under the provisions of the Transport Charges &c. (Miscellaneous Provisions) Act 1954 (2 & 3 Eliz. 2. c. 64). They were increased by the Rixton and Warburton Bridge Order 2024 (SI 2024/630), which was instead granted under the Transport and Works Act 1992.

== Time Team in Warburton ==
Since 1998, archaeological techniques such as field walking have led to the discovery of finds ranging in age from prehistoric flints and Bronze Age axe heads to Roman and late medieval finds. Featuring prominently amongst these finds were Roman artefacts including coins, brooches and a snake bracelet. At the invitation of local historian Jim Balme, Time Team excavated in Warburton in September 2006. They were searching for a Roman fortlet that previous archaeological digs by South Trafford Archaeological Group (STAG) had indicated might be present. Though no evidence of a Roman fortlet was found, the discovery of strip lynchets indicates that there was a Romano-British farm in Warburton. The presence of Roman finds was explained as rubbish, mixed in with manure to be spread on the crops.

== See also ==
- Listed buildings in Warburton, Greater Manchester
