= Cheadle railway station (Staffordshire) =

Former station in Staffordshire 1901–1963

Cheadle
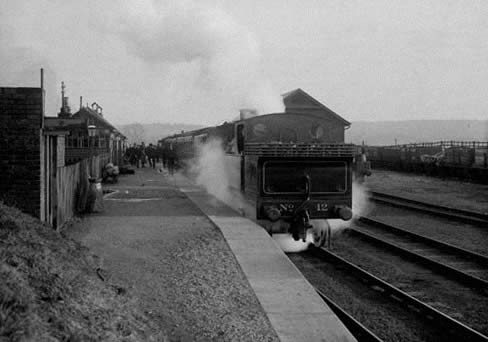
- Cheadle station in 1908, with the temporary station building on the left

General information
- Location: Cheadle, Staffordshire, Staffordshire Moorlands; England
- Coordinates: 52.9807°N 1.9929°W
- Grid reference: SK003425
- Platforms: 1

Other information
- Status: Disused

History
- Original company: North Staffordshire Railway
- Post-grouping: London, Midland and Scottish Railway; London Midland Region of British Railways

Key dates
- 1 January 1901: Opened
- 17 June 1963: Closed to passengers
- 6 March 1978: Closed to freight
- 1986: Closed completely
Location

Cheadle railway station served the town of Cheadle, Staffordshire, England. It was the terminus of a branch line from Cresswell and opened in 1901.

== Facilities ==
The initial station buildings were of a temporary nature and a permanent structure was built in 1910. Later that year, the goods yard was expanded and the goods shed was extended. A new loading dock was also built and a crane was later provided. Cheadle station had a loop but no turntable and so most trains left Cheadle with the locomotive running "bunker first".

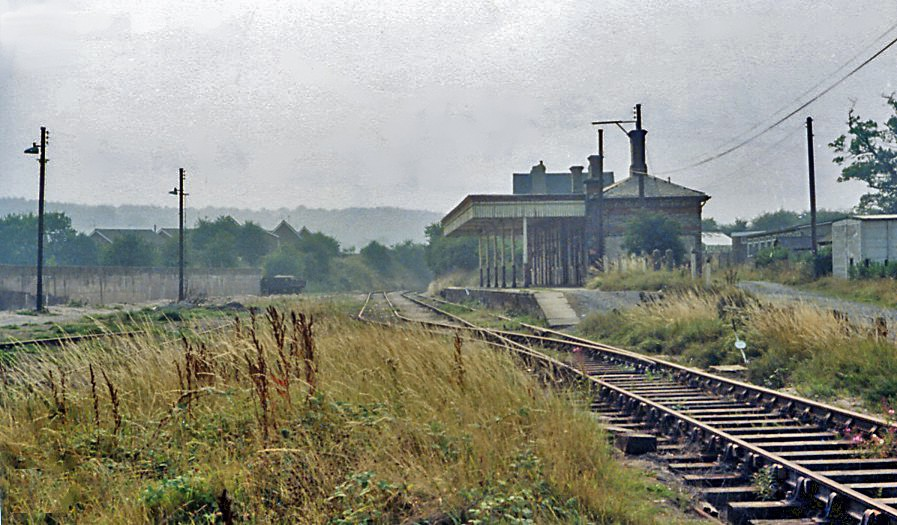
The remains in 1983

== Later years ==
Passenger services were withdrawn in June 1963, though the closure of the service was not directly due to the Beeching Axe (withdrawal had already been proposed prior to the publication of his report in March of that year). Local sand traffic from nearby quarries continued and a new road-rail loading dock replaced the goods shed in the late 1960s. Approximately 1,200 tons per day was being moved by this time but in the 1970s the amount of traffic reduced and on 6 March 1978 public freight working was withdrawn. A small amount of traffic for railway civil engineering use continued until November 3, 1984.

An InterCity charter train ran from Euston to Cheadle in 1985, InterCity choosing the Cheadle branch to show the versatility of their charter service. Passengers were taken to Alton Towers by coach from Cheadle, which fueled debate about a regular service, however this came to nothing

Cheadle station building was demolished in 1986, leaving just a bare platform at the end of the branch line that quickly became overgrown with weeds.

== The site today ==
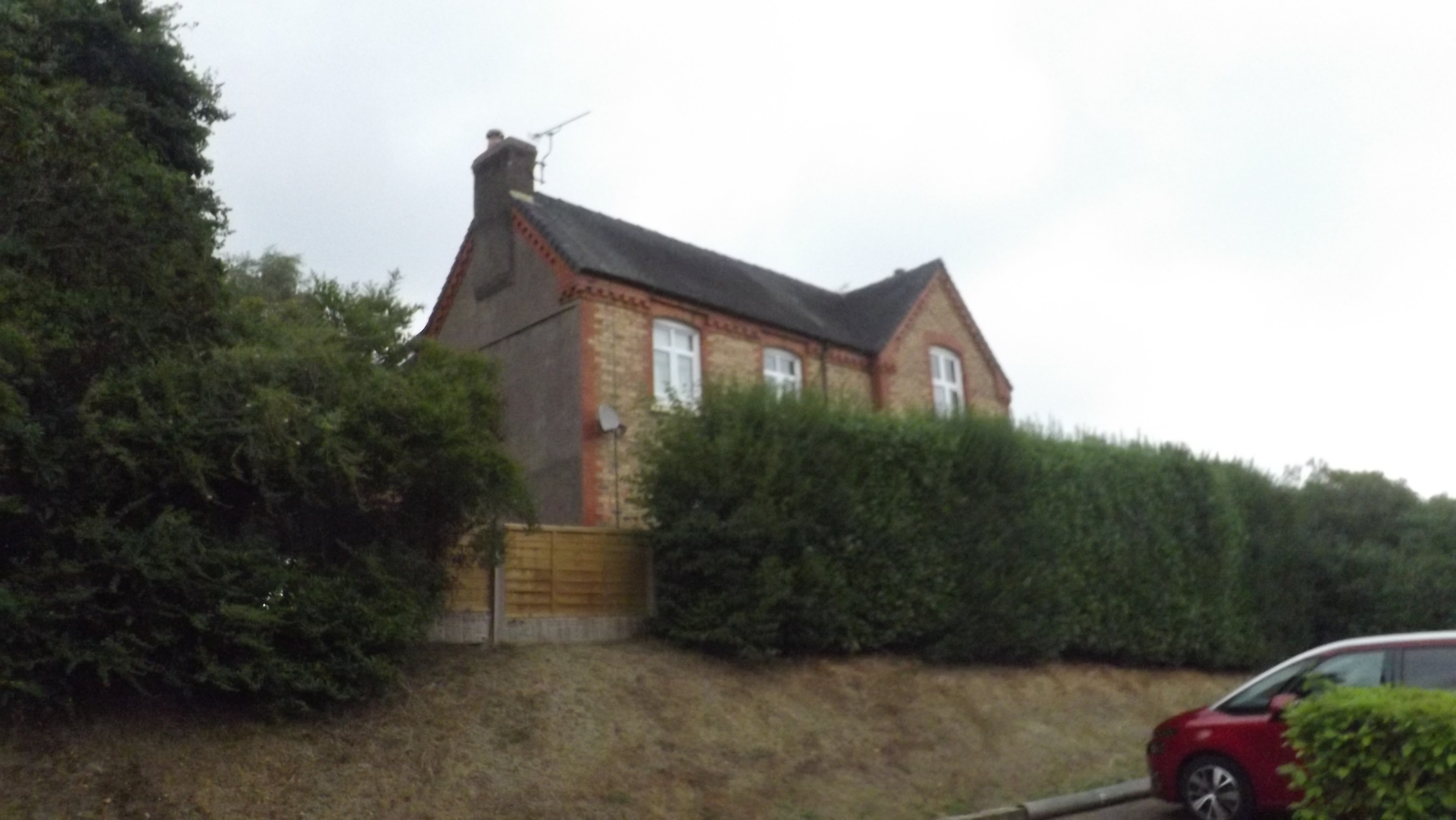
Former station masters house in 2018

The only trace of the station that remains today is the station master's house; the station platform was demolished in 1994, and the sand loading dock and a buffer stop that was left behind by the track lifters in 1992 were also crushed to make way for a new housing development.

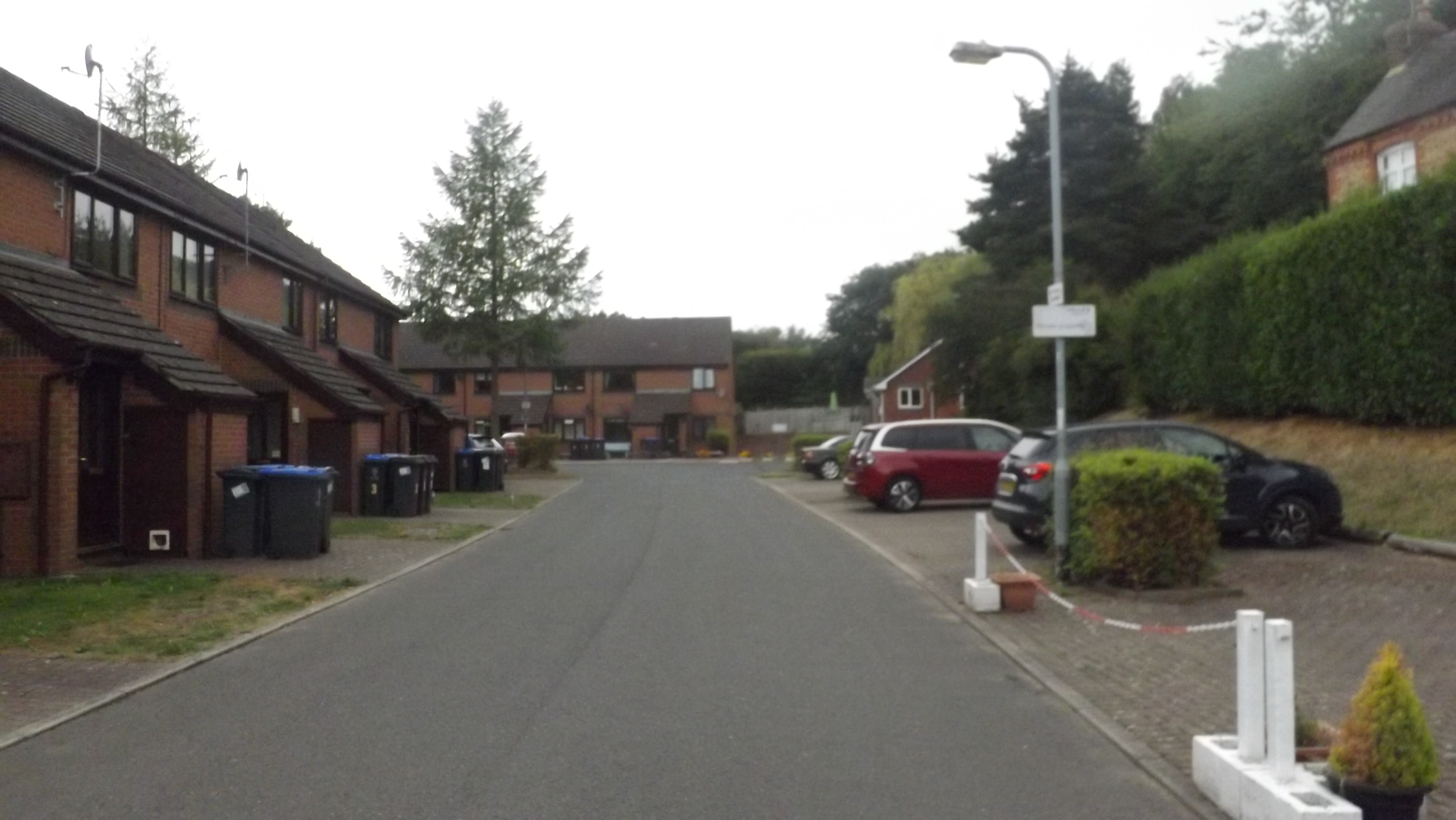
Looking in a similar direction to the 1983 photo towards Tean

Preceding station	Disused railways	Following station
Tean Line and station closed	North Staffordshire Railway Cheadle Branch Line	Terminus
