= Cresswell railway station =

Former railway station in England

Cresswell
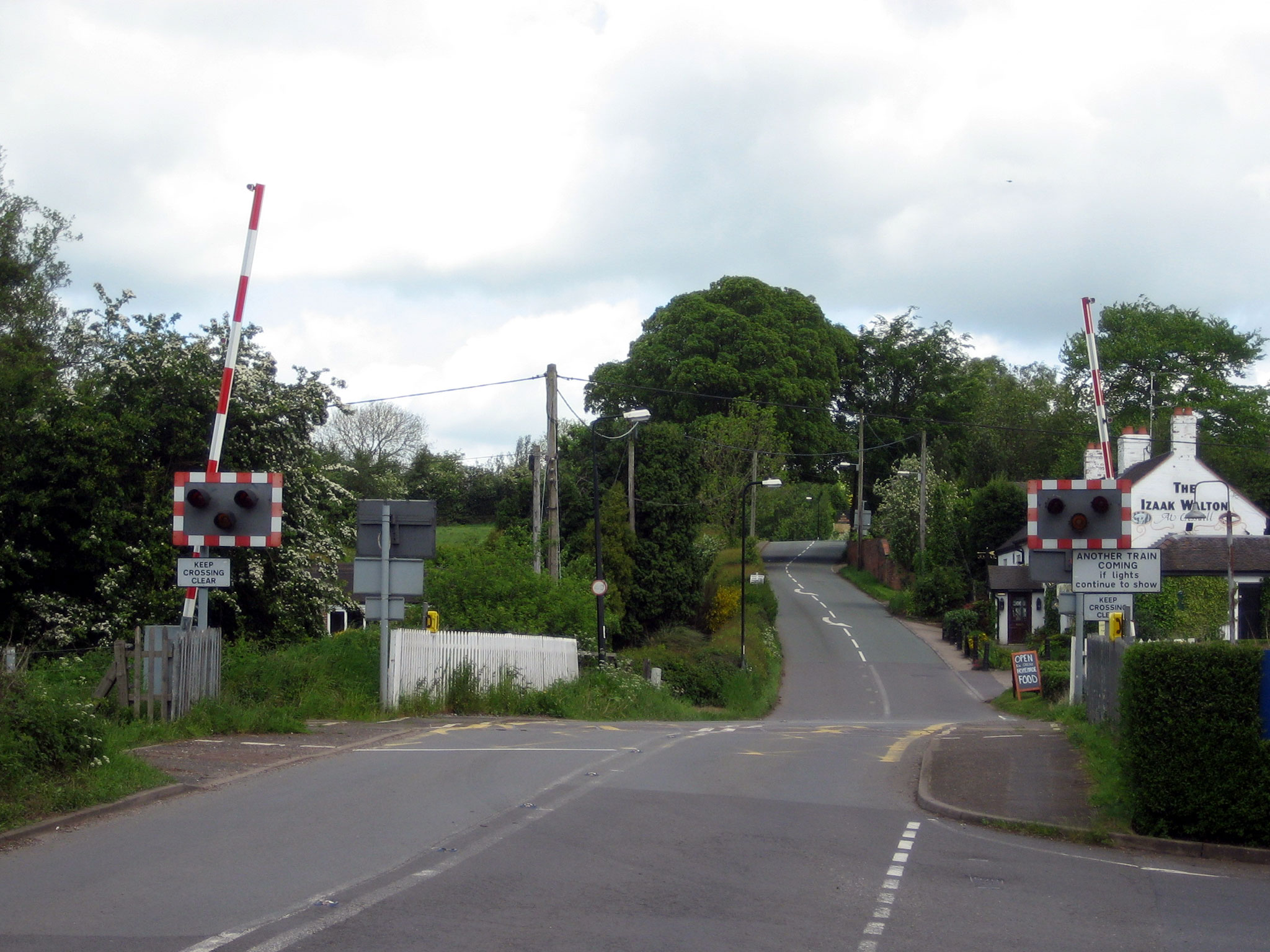
- Level crossing at the site of the former station

General information
- Location: Cresswell, Staffordshire, England
- Coordinates: 52.9508°N 2.0370°W
- Grid reference: SJ975394
- Platforms: 2

Other information
- Status: Disused

History
- Original company: North Staffordshire Railway
- Post-grouping: London, Midland and Scottish Railway; London Midland Region of British Railways

Key dates
- 7 August 1848: Opened
- 7 November 1966: Closed
Location

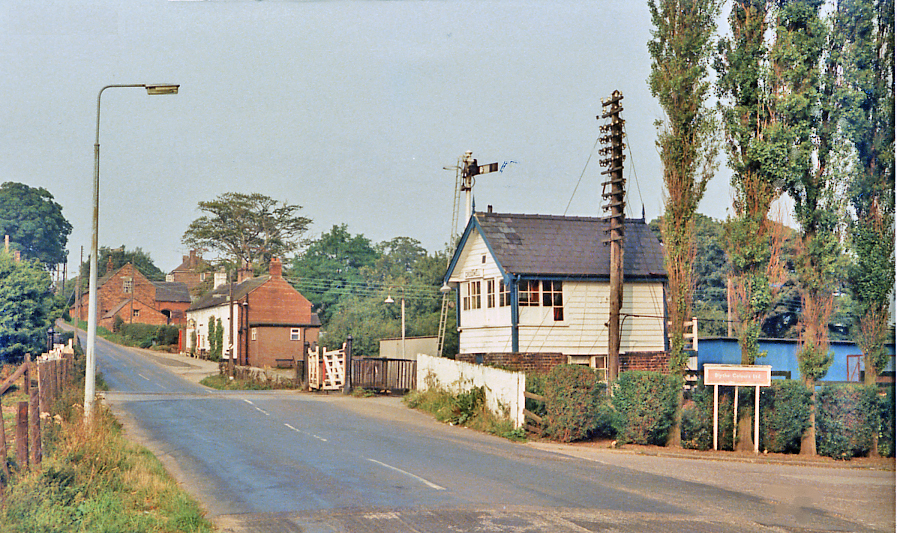
Site of Cresswell station in 1983

Cresswell railway station was a railway station located on the Stoke-Derby line serving the small village of Cresswell in the Staffordshire Moorlands district of Staffordshire, England. It was opened by the North Staffordshire Railway in 1848 and closed in 1966.

The station was located near the Izaak Walton pub and had a substantial building and a small goods yard. It became the junction station for the Cheadle Branch Line in 1892. When the latter closed to passengers, the sidings remained in occasional use for another 20 years, mainly sand traffic from Cheadle.

The level crossing was converted to automatic barrier operation in 1989, whereupon the signal box was demolished and the junction was lifted.

There is no trace of the station today.

Preceding station	Historical railways	Following station
Blythe Bridge Line and station open	North Staffordshire Railway Crewe to Derby Line	Leigh Line open, station closed
Terminus	North Staffordshire Railway Cheadle Branch Line	Tean Line and station closed
