= Fielding majolica =

Fielding majolica is pottery made at the Railway Pottery in Stoke on Trent under the proprietorship of Simon Fielding (1827–1906) and Abraham Fielding. Victorian majolica is a generic name given to the brightly coloured lead-glazed earthenware that was originally developed by Mintons for the Great Exhibition of 1851.

== Railway Pottery ==
The Railway Pottery was set up for the manufacture of high quality "General Ware and Art Ware" by Frederick Hackney and J. Kirkham, who had previously worked for Wedgwood. In 1878 Simon Fielding bought the company, which was subsequently known as S.Fielding and Co., and managed it with Abraham Fielding. Simon Fielding owned the Blyth Colour Works in Cresswell, Staffordshire, which gave the Railway Company direct control over important ceramic raw materials.

In 1879 the press praised the company for making "wonderful strides" and said, "majolica is equal to anything we have seen", but the company ran into debt. Abraham Fielding paid off the debts and took charge of the company. Hackney moved to Baltimore, United States to work for D.F.Haynes & Co. at the Chesapeake Pottery. In 1880, the Blyth Colour Works was sold to Piggot & Scarrott. The next ten years were the peak period for the manufacture of Fielding's pottery.

In 1893, a trade journal wrote of the Railway Pottery,

At the present time upwards of four hundred hands are employed by the firm, and there is every prospect of these being largely increased in the future. The reason of this success is not far to seek. The firm have aimed at the production of goods of artistic designs and excellent quality at the lowest possible prices, while by continually introducing novelties they have kept pace with the popular demand for something new. The consequence is that during the past five years the volume of the firm's business has been doubled. The firm's works, known as the Railway Pottery, is fitted up with all the latest machinery, driven by three powerful engines.

Abraham Fielding invented a patent down-draft kiln, in which the heat of the fire, instead of simply rising from the bottom of the oven up through the chimney at the top, rose and was then driven down through the centre of the kiln before rising through the chimney. This design distributed the heat more evenly in the kiln and reduced wear-and-tear.

The Railway Pottery was renamed the Devon Pottery in 1912 and developed the Crown Devon line.

== Designs ==
By 1878 the Railway Pottery was making a range of majolica jugs, bread trays, oyster plates, etc.

Ten majolica designs were registered between 1881 and 1884 and were used on a huge range of goods: tea and coffee sets, dessert, fruit, ice cream and fish services, vases, jardinieres, cuspidors, jugs, tea pots and umbrella stands.

Umbrella stands were made in standard designs and designs incorporating goats, hares, ducks, cranes and a tree trunk with a girl skater. A Kate Greenaway stand was made, which contained figures on panels representing spring and autumn. Perhaps the most bizarre stand produced in 1879 showed: "The Ameer of Afghanistan running up a tree, in the shape of a monkey, to escape from John Bull, who is supposed to be shooting at him" (Pottery Gazette)

A fox fruit dish was described as follows: "The surface of this dish has a fine grouping of ferns and foliage and the handle or knob is formed by a well moulded fox that is intently watching a rabbit peeping from beneath a burrow."

The most popular designs were: fan, fan and insect, fan and scroll, fan and daisy, and other fan designs; ribbon and leaf, ribbon and daisy, shell and net, hummingbird and bamboo, pansy and fuchsia; shell shapes, panels with birds, squirrels and other animals. The background colours are argenta white, turquoise, yellow, and cobalt blue. The oyster plates are highly prized, particularly in the USA.

Other designs:

- Butterfly and bamboo
- Cobalt blue moustache cup
- Figural and panelled jugs
- Garden seats
- Ribbon and leaf
- Shaving mugs
- Shell and net
- Wheat and daisy
- Wheat ribbon and daisy

== Back stamps ==
Early majolica was stamped with a fleur de lys in a shield. Other marks are a diamond and the word Fielding. On 19th century majolica, all marks are impressed, not printed, but there are some black or, occasionally, purple painters' marks. Shell feet are often found.
