= Tean railway station =

Former railway station in England

Tean
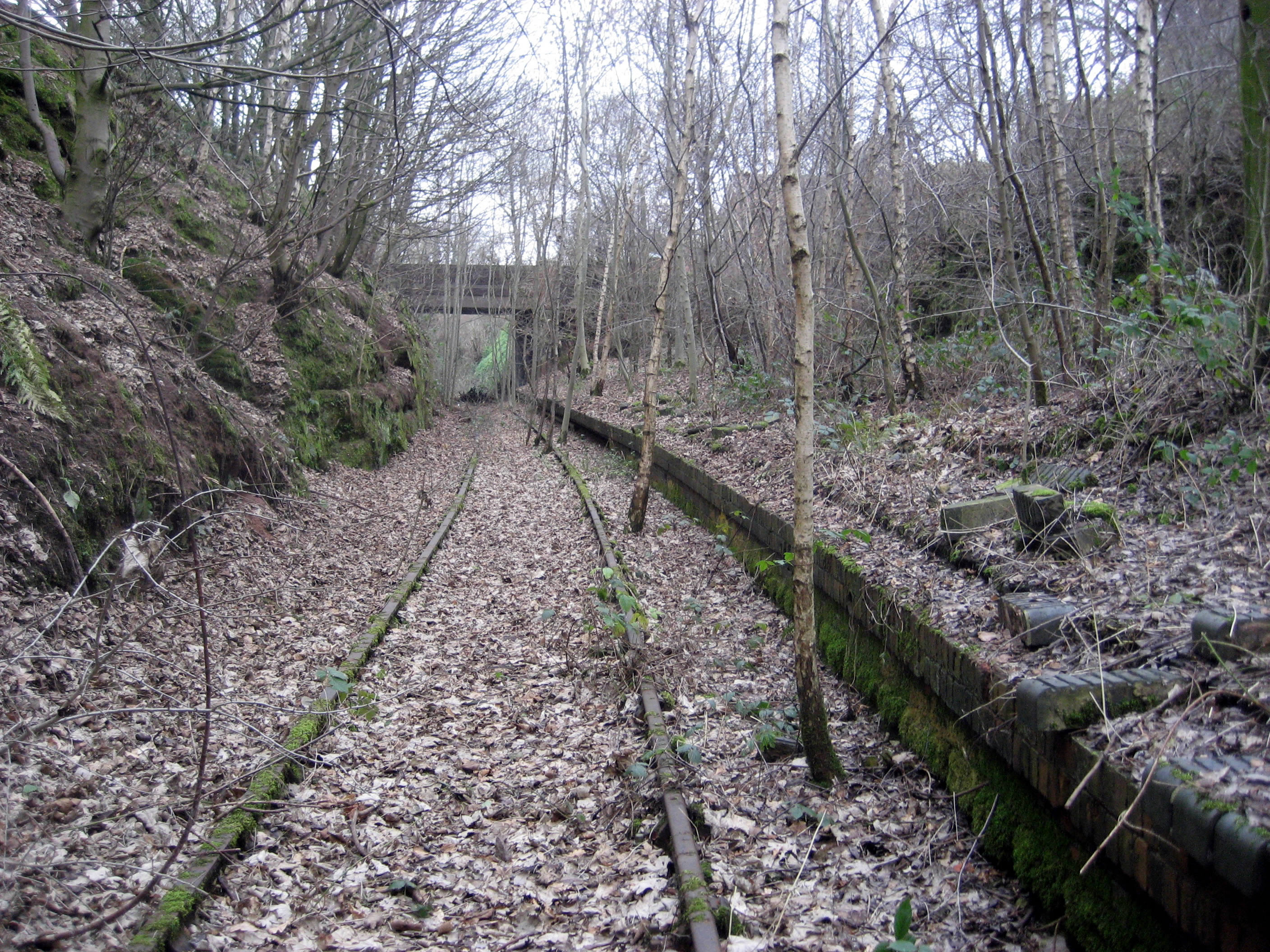
- The remains of Tean railway station, December 2008

General information
- Location: Totmonslow, Staffordshire, Staffordshire Moorlands; England
- Coordinates: 52.9545°N 2.0093°W
- Grid reference: SJ994397
- Platforms: 1

Other information
- Status: Disused

History
- Original company: North Staffordshire Railway
- Post-grouping: London, Midland and Scottish Railway; London Midland Region of British Railways

Key dates
- 7 November 1892: Opened as Totmonslow
- 1 February 1907: Renamed to "Tean"
- 1 June 1953: Closed
Location

Tean railway station was a railway station located on the Cheadle Branch Line at Totmonslow, Staffordshire. It was opened as Totmonslow in 1892 and was the terminus of the line until it reached Cheadle in 1901.

== Facilities ==
The station was located in a cutting underneath the Stoke to Uttoxeter turnpike road and had a small goods siding with shed. Because of the restricted location, a loop was provided a short distance to the south, although it was never actually used a such and was removed in 1938.

A platform shelter was the only building until 1907, when part of the station building from Keele Park railway station was erected, the latter having closed earlier that year. Up until this point, a nearby cottage was used as a booking office.

== Later years ==
The station was renamed in 1906 after the village of Upper Tean, which was located around a mile east of Totmonslow. It was never well used and closed in 1953, having by then been reduced to a halt. The goods siding was soon removed and the station site occupied by a scrap merchant until 1977.

Preceding station	Disused railways	Following station
Cresswell Line and station closed	North Staffordshire Railway Cheadle Branch Line	Cheadle Line and station closed

== The site today ==
The track was removed in 2013. The platform remains, although overgrown, and can be seen from the adjacent road bridge.
