= St Mary's Church, Cresswell =

Church of St Mary
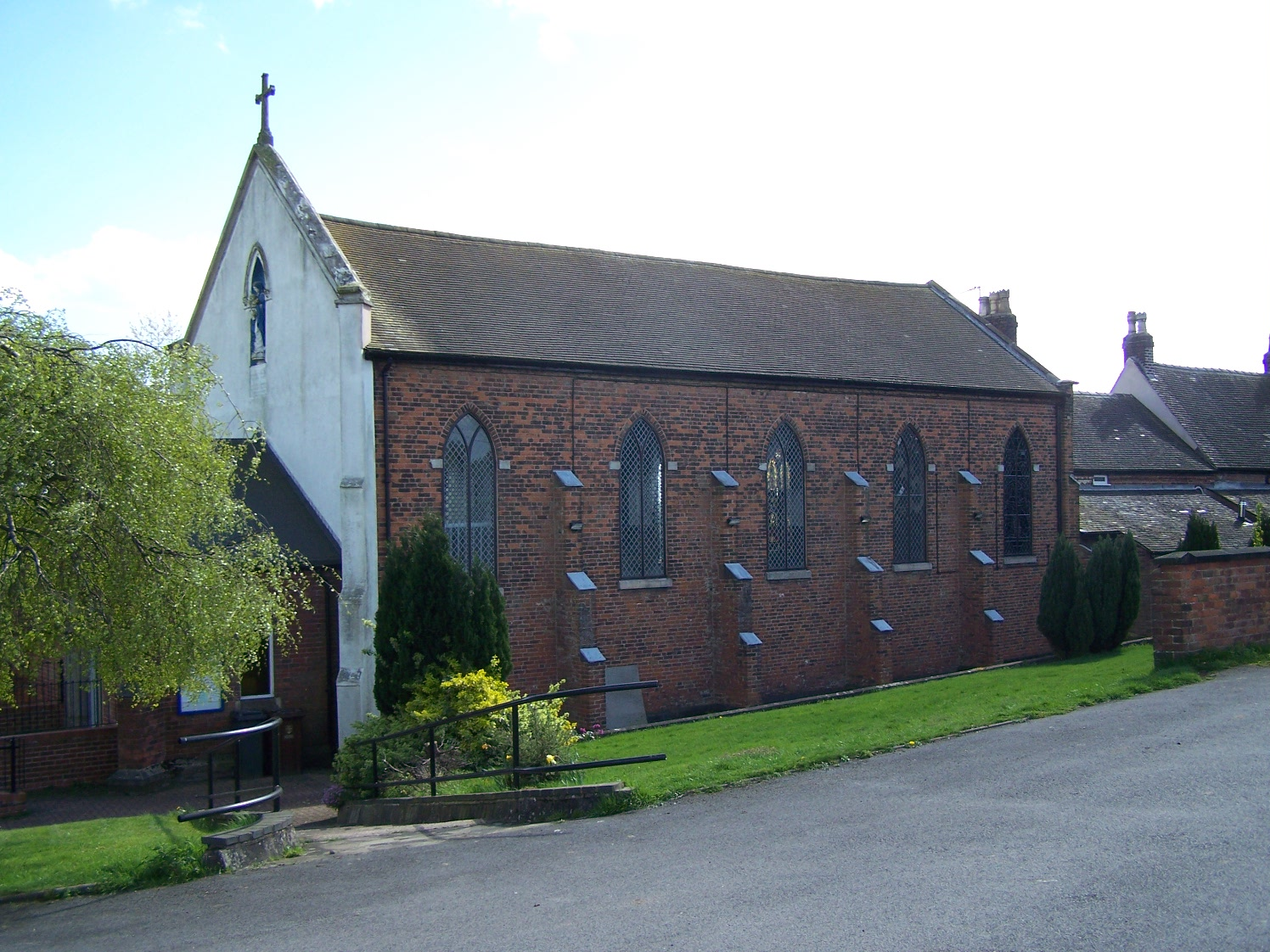
- Viewed from the north
- Church of St Mary
- 52°57′5.303″N 2°1′57.990″W
- OS grid reference: SJ 97895 39344
- Location: Cresswell, Staffordshire
- Country: England
- Denomination: Roman Catholic

Architecture
- Heritage designation: Grade II listed
- Designated: 4 February 2016
- Completed: 1816

Administration
- Diocese: Archdiocese of Birmingham

St Mary's Church is a Roman Catholic church in Cresswell, a hamlet near Draycott in the Moors in Staffordshire, England, and in the Archdiocese of Birmingham. The building, completed in 1816, is Grade II listed.

== History ==
St Mary's in Cresswell was the first Roman Catholic church built in north Staffordshire after the Roman Catholic Relief Act of 1791. It was built in 1815–1816 for Thomas Baddeley, and funded by Lady Mary Stourton, a member of the family owning the Draycott estate. The adjoining house, dating from the 17th century (now Grade II listed), was by the time of the building of the church a presbytery. The church contains vestments and a chalice from the chapel at Paynsley Hall, which was owned by the Draycott family. Paynsley Hall, near Cresswell, is now demolished; the remaining moated site is a scheduled monument.

== Description ==
It is a brick building with rendered gable ends, and a mid 20th-century porch to the north-east. The sides are separated by stepped buttresses into five bays, each with a lancet window, and there are stepped buttresses at each corner.

The interior was reordered in the 1960s, becoming more simplified, with many fittings dating from this time. There are wall mounted memorials, originally in the chapel at Paynsley Hall. There is a window of 1848 by A. W. N. Pugin to Lady Stourton, depicting the Annunciation, made by Hardman & Co. The Romanesque stone font of the mid 19th century is probably not by Pugin, as was once supposed. The sanctuary in the south-west, liturgical east, has a 20th-century altar of marble, with mosaic and opus sectile panels.

The churchyard cross in the adjacent cemetery dates from the mid 19th century, and is attributed to A. W. N. Pugin. It is listed Grade II.

== See also ==
- Listed buildings in Draycott in the Moors
