= Northenden railway station =

Former railway station in Greater Manchester, England

Northenden
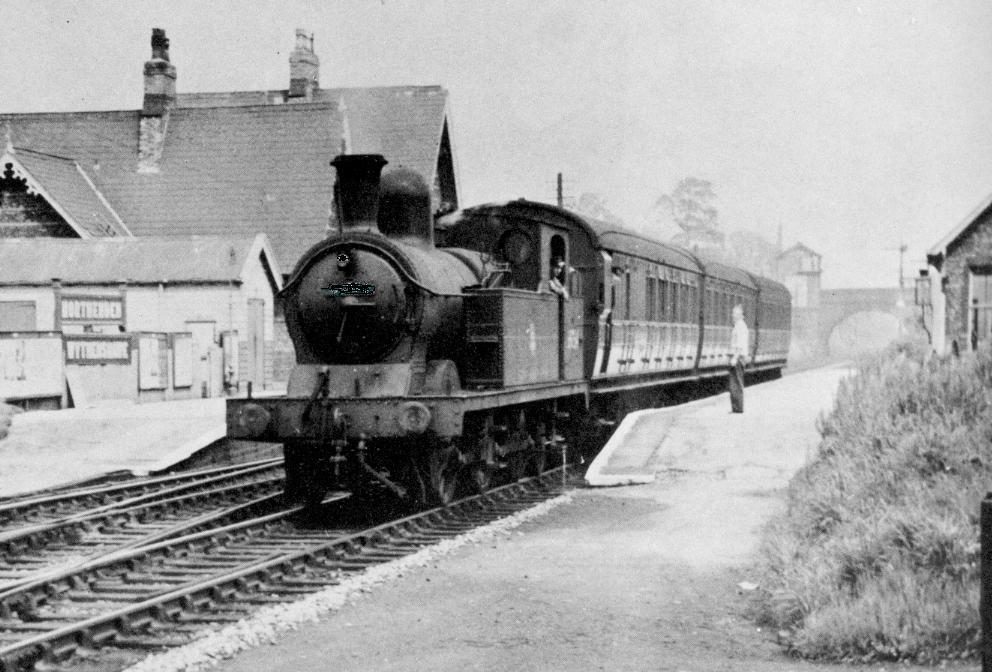
- Northenden station in 1954, looking east; it shows the station building, with the signal box in the background

General information
- Location: Sharston, Manchester; England
- Coordinates: 53.3986°N 2.2531°W
- Grid reference: SJ832891
- Platforms: 2

Other information
- Status: Disused

History
- Original company: Stockport, Timperley and Altrincham Junction Railway
- Pre-grouping: Cheshire Lines Committee
- Post-grouping: Cheshire Lines Committee

Key dates
- 1 February 1866: Opened
- 30 November 1964: Closed
Location

Northenden railway station served the suburb of Northenden, in Manchester, England; it was located to the south-east of the town in Sharston.

== Opening ==
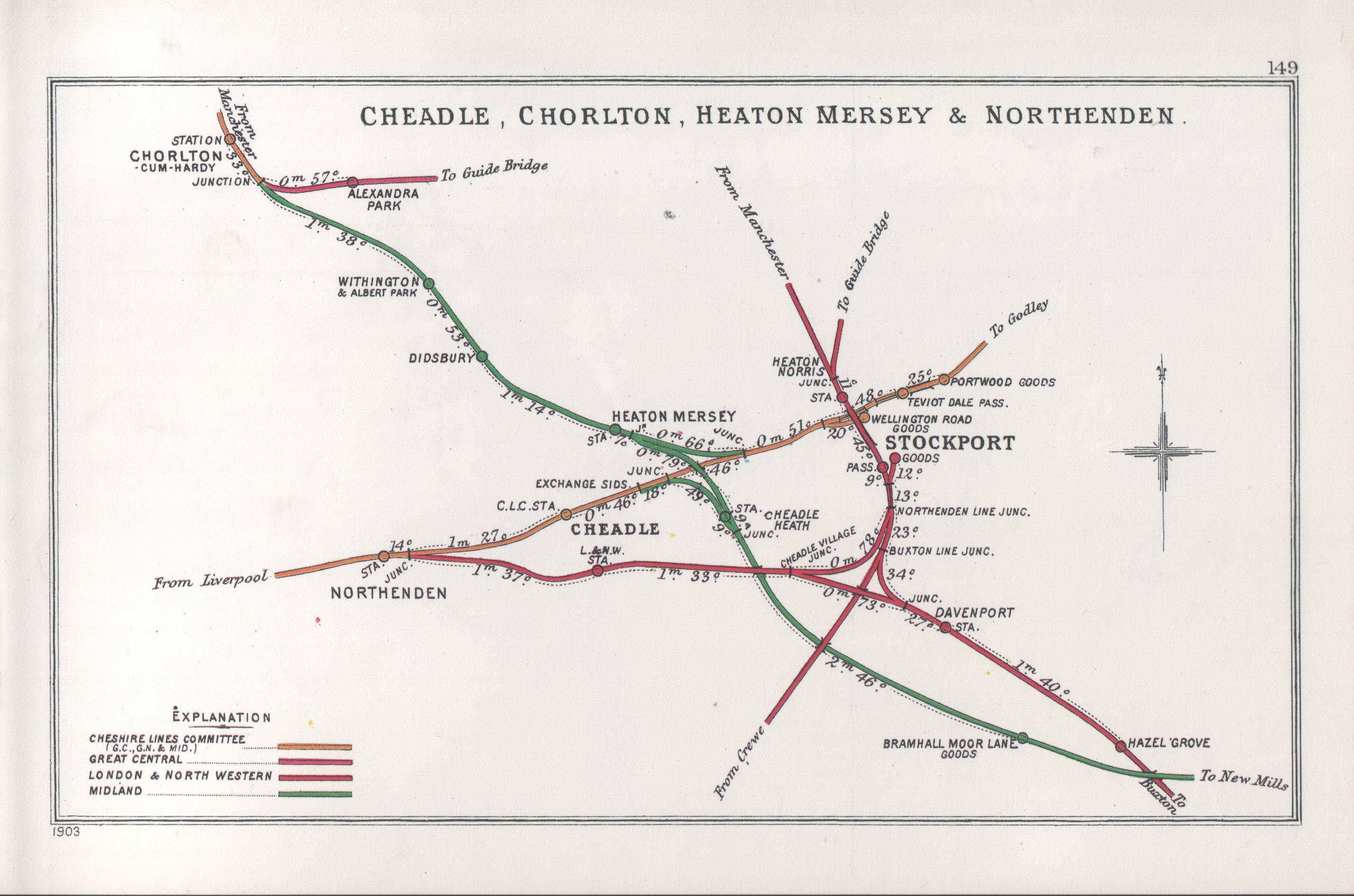
A 1903 Railway Clearing House diagram of railways in south Manchester (Note: The map shows Northenden station and the junction, with the CLC line (top) running towards Stockport Tiviot Dale and the LNWR line (bottom) running towards Stockport Edgeley)

Northenden station was built by the Stockport, Timperley and Altrincham Junction Railway (ST&AJ) and opened for passenger and goods traffic on 1 February 1866.

On 15 August 1867, the ST&AJ became part of the Cheshire Lines Committee (CLC); it became jointly owned by the London and North Eastern Railway and the London, Midland and Scottish Railway on 1 January 1923.

Some railway timetables described the station as Northenden for Wythenshawe because, lying between the road bridges at Sharston Road and Longley Lane, it served the two districts.

== Facilities ==
The main brick-built station building was constructed to a typical Cheshire Lines Committee design, with steeply sloping roofs and decorative wooden barge boarding.

It contained the booking office, passenger waiting room, parcels office, toilet facilities and the station master's accommodation. Until the 1890s, a telegraph office, which was available to send public messages, was located in the station building.

The main building was located on the north side of the line and therefore was nearest to Northenden village; it served passenger trains travelling eastwards from Liverpool and Warrington towards Stockport.

On the south side of the line was a smaller brick-built building containing a waiting room for passengers; it could be reached from the station's eastern end by a boarded railway crossing. This platform served passenger trains from Stockport travelling westwards towards Warrington and Liverpool.

== Northenden Junction signal box ==
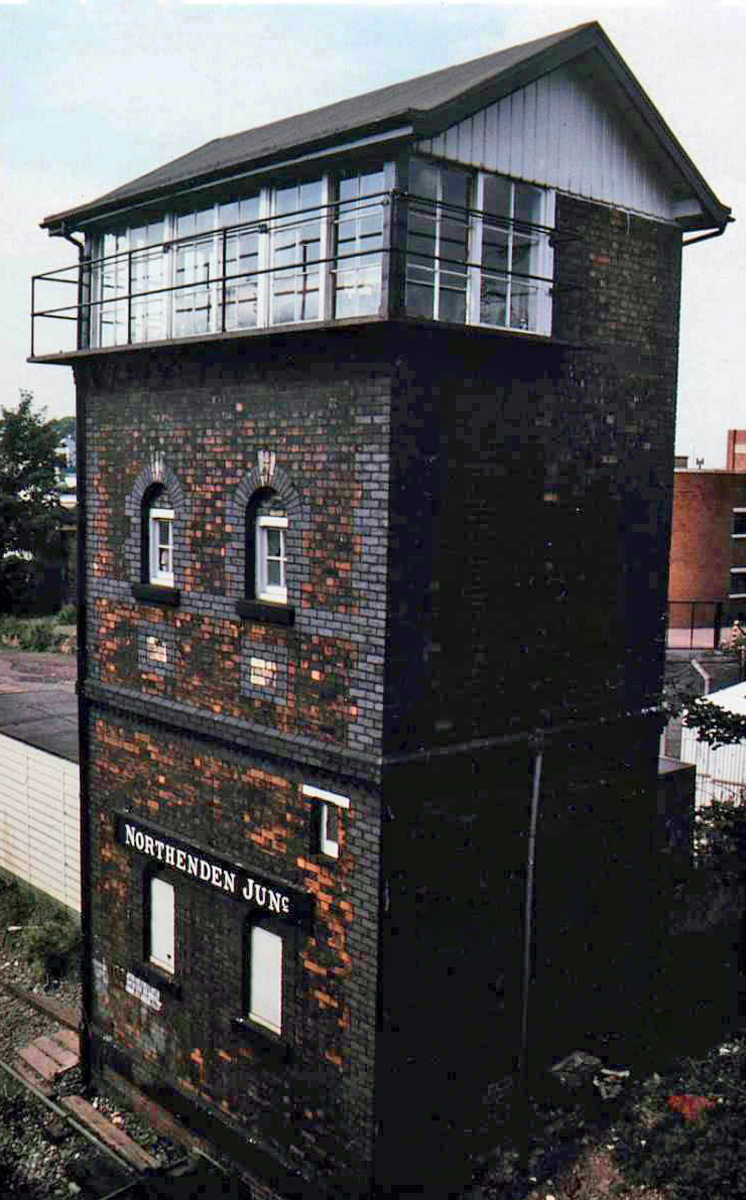
Northenden Junction signal box in 1979 taken from the Longley Lane bridge

Northenden Junction signal box is sited 200 yards (183 metres) to the east of where the main station buildings were, on the north side of the line, adjoining Longley Lane. It was built in 1881 by Stevens & Sons using CLC's standard dark-brick construction. It utilised an unusually tall design, sufficiently high to enable the signalman on duty to readily see above Longley Lane road bridge over the line and on to Northenden Junction; this is where the London & North Western Railway's line from Stockport Edgeley joined the CLC line from Stockport Tiviot Dale. The signal box controlled sets of signals protecting the junction and also operated the powered railway switching points.

== Passenger services ==
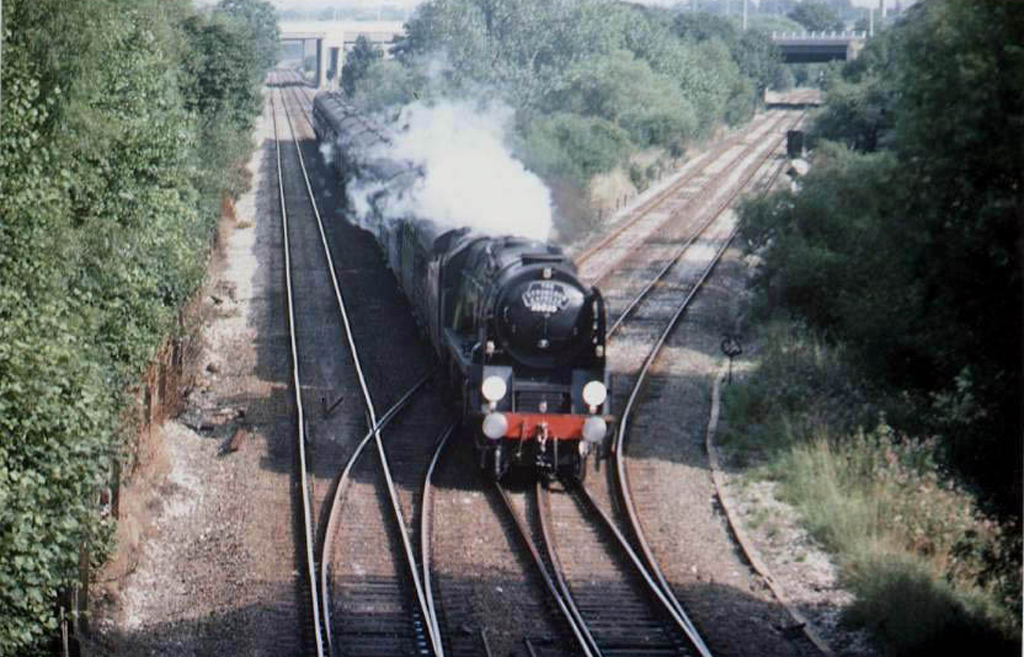
Northenden Junction in 1979 (Note: The photo shows the line from Stockport Tiviot Dale CLC on the left (now singled) and the line from Stockport LNW on the right (now mostly singled). The photo was taken looking east from the Longley Lane bridge, with 35028 Clan Line heading west.)

From its opening in 1866, Northenden station was served by local CLC passenger trains from Stockport Tiviot Dale to Altrincham, Warrington Central and Liverpool Central stations.

The London and North Western Railway (LNWR) opened its line from Stockport Edgeley, via Cheadle LNW to Northenden on 1 August 1866. Between that date and 1917, the LNWR operated a passenger train service from Stockport Edgeley and on to Broadheath and Warrington Arpley, thence to Liverpool Lime Street. These trains used the Northenden Line Junction to Cheadle Village Junction curve in Stockport to access the line to Northenden.

During the late 19th century, the CLC operated five trains per day from Stockport Tiviot Dale, stopping at Northenden and continuing via Deansgate Junction near Broadheath to Altrincham. The trains were timed to connect at Altrincham with the CLC trains from Manchester Central to Northwich and Chester.

Until 1939, some express trains running through Sheffield Victoria, along the Woodhead Line, used the route from Godley East through Northenden to bypass Manchester. This included some LNER Hull Paragon to Liverpool trains, which did not stop at the station.

The weekday westbound CLC local train service in July 1922 comprised four trains to Warrington or Liverpool and five to Altrincham. By August 1946, the service to Altrincham had ceased and just four passenger trains per weekday ran to Warrington Central and Liverpool Central. The January 1956 passenger service was at the same sparse level.

For most of the station's existence, the passenger trains were hauled by steam locomotives but, for some years leading up to the Second World War, some services from Stockport to Altrincham, via Northenden, were operated by the CLC's own fleet of Sentinel steam railcars.

Preceding station	Disused railways	Following station
Baguley; Line open, station closed	Cheshire Lines Committee; Stockport, Timperley and Altrincham Junction Railway	Cheadle (CLC); Line open, station closed
Baguley; Line open, station closed	London and North Western Railway; Warrington and Stockport Railway	Cheadle (LNW); Line open, station closed

== Closure ==
Northenden station was closed on 30 November 1964, when passenger trains were withdrawn by British Railways and the buildings were later demolished.

== The line and site today ==
Passenger trains continue to run along the line, through the disused site. Northern Trains operates diesel multiple units on the Mid-Cheshire line between Manchester Piccadilly and Chester, via Stockport, Navigation Road, Altrincham and Northwich.

Diesel-hauled freight trains still run through Northenden. These include heavy block trains carrying limestone from quarries at Tunstead, near Buxton, in Derbyshire to the alkali works located near Northwich, Cheshire.

== Freight services ==
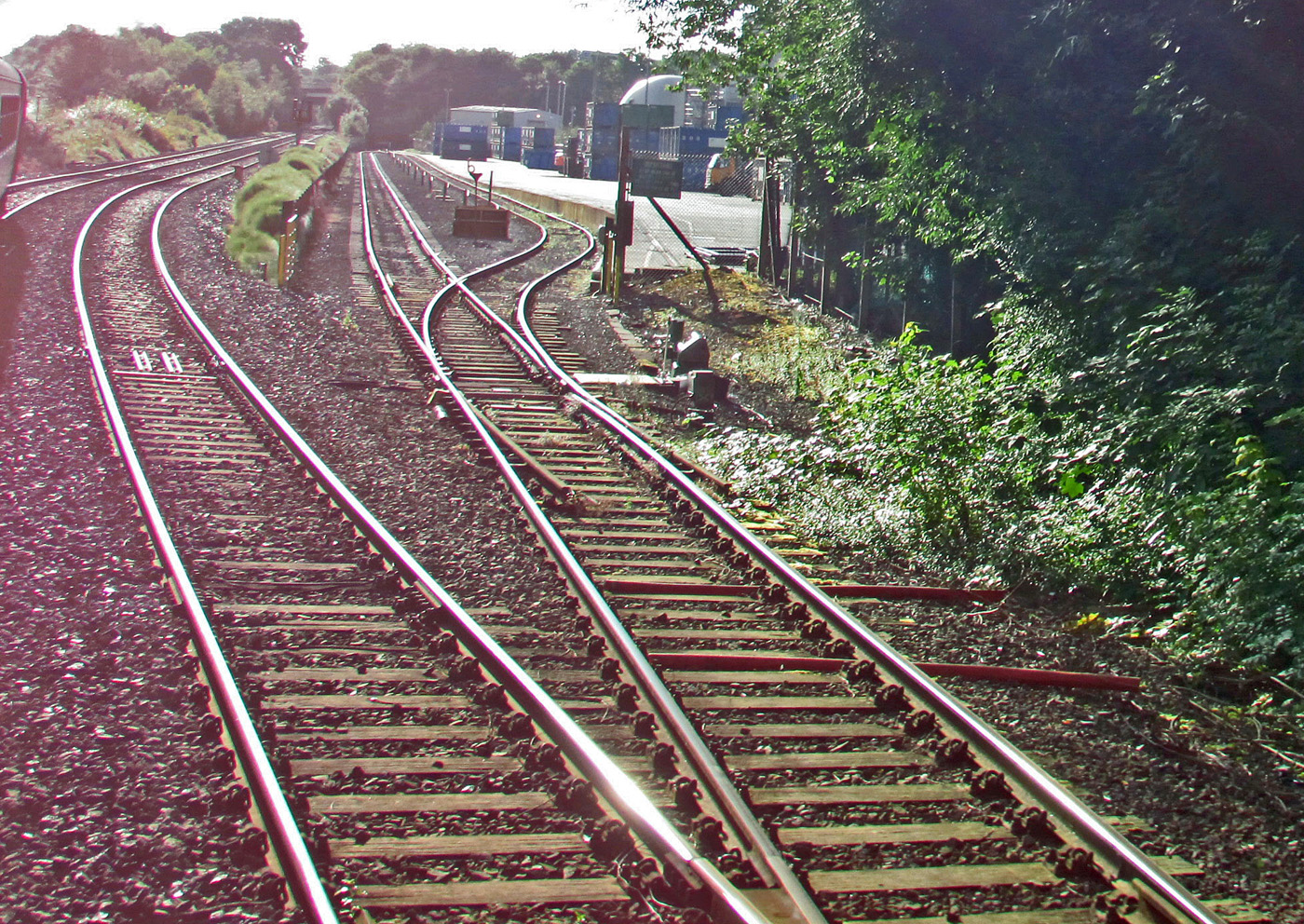
Northenden Junction, looking south-east towards Stockport in 2016; to the right, it shows the two-line waste disposal siding and processing facilities

A two-line goods siding was located to the south of the westbound platform; it was served by local freight trains, which shunted the sidings each day. The goods facilities at Northenden were withdrawn on 19 June 1965, although the sidings remained in use for cement manufacturing companies including Blue Circle Cement and later Lafarge.

Until the early 1960s, there was an intensive service of freight trains through Northenden, heading from Yorkshire and the North Midlands to Liverpool Docks and Birkenhead Docks. Local freight trains stopped at Northenden each day, with goods wagons containing coal and other materials being shunted into the sidings for unloading by local merchants and businesses.

A large waste disposal terminal was constructed to the south of the junction in the mid-1970s; this was the property of Greater Manchester County Council and then Greater Manchester Waste Disposal Authority from 1986. This two-line siding continues in use for the dispatch of container trains carrying landfill refuse to Roxby Gullet, near Scunthorpe in North Lincolnshire.

== See also ==
- Rose Hill, Northenden, the home of railway magnate Sir Edward Watkin, located 0.25 miles (0.40 km) north-east of Northenden station
