= Listed buildings in Draycott in the Moors =

Draycott in the Moors is a civil parish in the district of Staffordshire Moorlands, Staffordshire, England. It contains twelve listed buildings that are recorded in the National Heritage List for England. Of these, one is at Grade II*, the middle of the three grades, and the others are at Grade II, the lowest grade. The parish includes the villages of Draycott in the Moors and Cresswell, and the surrounding area. The listed buildings consist of houses and farmhouses, two churches with items in the churchyards, and a milepost.

== Key ==
Grade	Criteria
II*	Particularly important buildings of more than special interest
II	Buildings of national importance and special interest

== Buildings ==
Name and location	Photograph	Date	Notes	Grade
St Margaret's Church; 52.95947°N 2.02959°W		Early 13th century	The church was altered in the 16th century and in about 1848. It is built in sandstone with tile roofs, and consists of a nave, north and south aisles, a south porch, a chancel, a north chapel, and a west tower. The tower has three stages, diagonal buttresses, a clock face, a string course with gargoyles, and an embattled parapet. Along the aisles is a fretted parapet.	II*
Paynsley Hall; 52.93935°N 2.02085°W	—	16th century	The remains of a farmhouse that was refaced in the 18th century and extended in the 19th century. It is partly timber framed and partly in red brick and has a tile roof.	II
St. Mary's House; 52.95137°N 2.03292°W	—	17th century	The house, later a presbytery, was extended in the 19th century. The original part is in stone and has a tile roof with verge parapets on corbelled kneelers on the left. There are two storeys and three bays. In the centre is a bay window with a hipped roof, and the other windows are casements. The extension to the right is in brick, and contains a bay widow and a porch with a hipped roof.	II
Manor Farmhouse; 52.95822°N 2.02887°W	—	Late 17th century	The farmhouse was refaced in the 19th century and altered in the 20th century. It is partly in rendered stone and partly in brick, and has a tile roof. There are two storeys and an attic, and three bays. On the front is a gabled porch with verge parapets, and a doorway with a heavy lintel. The windows on the front are casements, and on the side are chamfered mullioned windows.	II
Wastegate Farmhouse; 52.94099°N 2.03678°W	—	Early 18th century	The farmhouse is in roughcast brick and has a tile roof. There are two storeys and an attic, and an L-shaped plan, with a front of three bays. The central doorway has a fanlight, and the windows are casements with aprons and keystones.	II
The Old Rectory; 52.95913°N 2.02659°W	—	18th century	The former rectory is in rendered brick, and has a tile roof. There are two storeys and an attic, five bays, and it contains sash windows. The outer bays are gabled and contain flat-roofed two-storey semicircular bay windows with bands between the storeys and tripartite windows. In the gables are shield motifs and attic windows. There is a central doorway with a moulded surround, a fanlight and a hood, and above it is a gabled dormer.	II
Hancock memorial 52.95937°N 2.02951°W	—	Mid to late 18th century (probable)	The memorial is in the churchyard of St Margaret's Church, and is to the memory of Jane Hancock. It is a chest tomb in stone, and has a moulded plinth, waisted balusters at the angles, a moulded top slab, and inscribed sides.	II
The Fields Farmhouse; 52.97165°N 2.02594°W	—	Late 18th century	The farmhouse, which was altered in the 20th century, is in rendered brick, and has a tile roof with verge parapets. There are three storeys and three bays. In the centre is a porch with a hipped roof, and the windows are three-light casements, those in the lower two floors with segmental heads and raised keystones.	II
St Mary's Church, Cresswell; 52.95150°N 2.03264°W		1815–16	A Roman Catholic church, it is in red brick with stone dressings, rendered gable ends, and a tile roof. The church has a rectangular plan, and consists of a nave and chancel in one unit, and a gabled porch. In the gable end is a niche with a hood mould containing a statue of Our Lady. Along the sides are buttresses and two-light lancet windows.	II
Hyatt memorial 52.95937°N 2.02963°W	—	1827	The memorial is in the churchyard of St Margaret's Church, and is to the memory of Anna Hyatt. It is a chest tomb in stone, and has a moulded plinth and top slab, and inscribed sides and angles.	II
Milepost at SJ9945039761; 52.95508°N 2.00870°W		1828	The milepost is on the south side of Draycott Road. It is in cast iron and has a triangular plan, a sloping top, and a back plate with a segmental-arched head. On the top is "DRAYCOTT PARISH", on the sides are the distances to Uttoxeter and Newcastle-under-Lyme, and on the back plate are the distances to Liverpool and London.	II
Churchyard cross 52.95164°N 2.03226°W	—	Late 18th century	The cross is in the churchyard of St Mary's Church, Cresswell, and is in stone. Its design is attributed to A. W. N. Pugin. The cross has a base of two steps and an octagonal plinth. On this stands a wheel-head cross with foliate terminals, and an octagonal shaft with a foliate capital.	II
