= Cheadle railway station =

Former railway station in Greater Manchester, England

Coordinates: 53.39526°N 2.21645°W

Cheadle
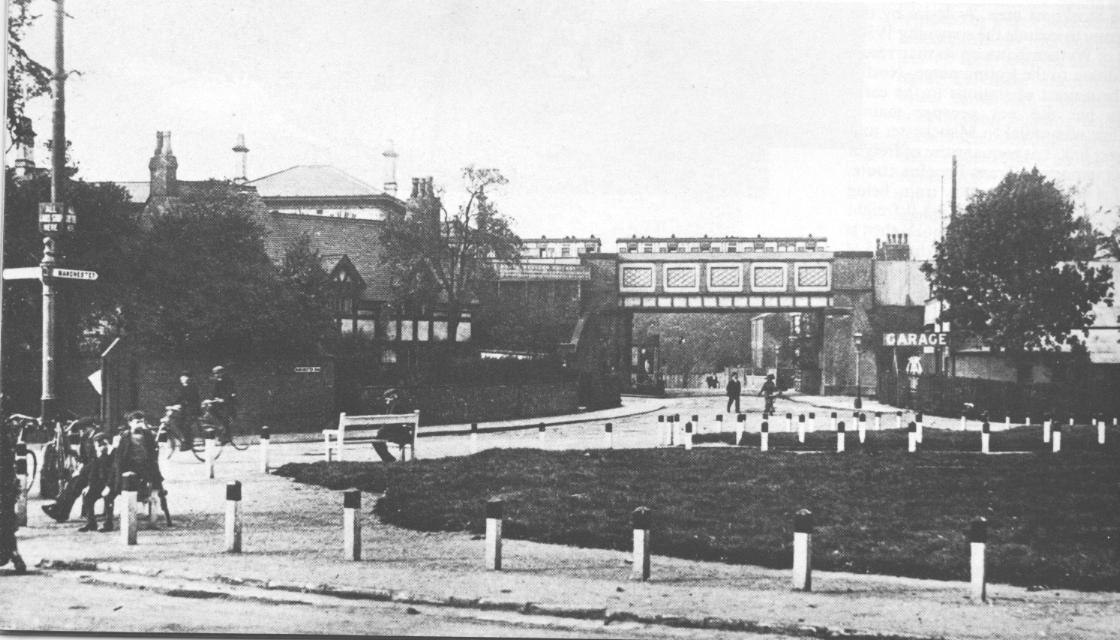
- The station in circa 1905, viewed looking north down Manchester Road from Cheadle High Street. (Note: The roof of the main station building is seen above a cottage and an LNWR local train stands in the platform. An LNWR sign is affixed to the left hand side of the bridge, promoting services from the station.)

General information
- Location: Cheadle, England
- Platforms: 2

Other information
- Status: Disused

History
- Original company: London and North Western Railway

Key dates
- 1 August 1866: Opened
- 1 January 1917: Closed
Location

Cheadle LNW railway station served Cheadle, Cheshire, England, between 1866 and its closure in 1917.

== Opening ==
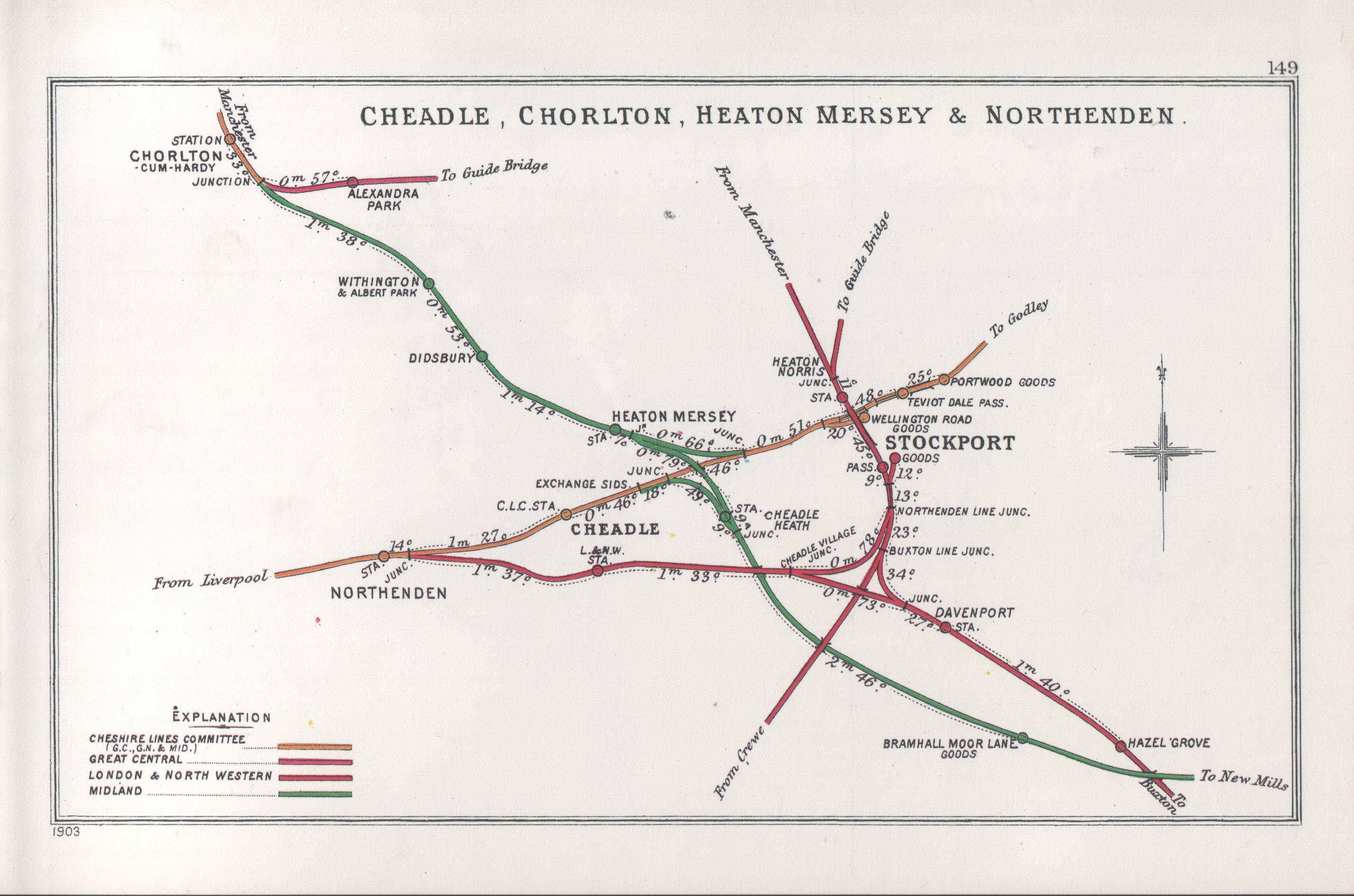
A 1903 Railway Clearing House diagram of railways through Cheadle, showing the LNWR station and Cheadle CLC to its north

The London and North Western Railway completed its line from Stockport Edgeley to Northenden in 1866; the station opened on 1 August.

== Location ==
Location (red dot) within Stockport's historical rail network

The station was located 100 yards (90 m) north of Cheadle High Street, on the western side of the road, at the point where the line crossed over Manchester Road. It was reached by steps leading up to it.

Two platforms were provided: the northern platform handled trains from Warrington to Stockport and the southern side for trains heading west to Warrington and Liverpool.

== Services ==
On the opening of the line and the station in 1866, the LNWR immediately commenced operating a passenger train service from Manchester London Road to Cheadle, via Stockport Edgeley; services continued onwards to Northenden, Broadheath, Warrington Arpley and Liverpool Lime Street.

In December 1895, 20 trains per weekday operated from Manchester via Stockport; seven of these continued on to Broadheath near Altrincham, with two continuing on to Liverpool.

Preceding station	Disused railways	Following station
Northenden; Line open, station closed	London and North Western Railway; Warrington and Stockport Railway	Stockport Edgeley; Line and station open

== Closure ==
The service was discontinued on 1 January 1917 and the station was closed that day.

Goods trains operated by LNWR, and London Midland and Scottish Railway from 1923, continued to use the line through the station's site from 1917 until 1948. From that date, the trains were operated by British Railways' London Midland Region until 21 August 1967, though it was renamed Cheadle South from 1 July 1950.

== The site today ==
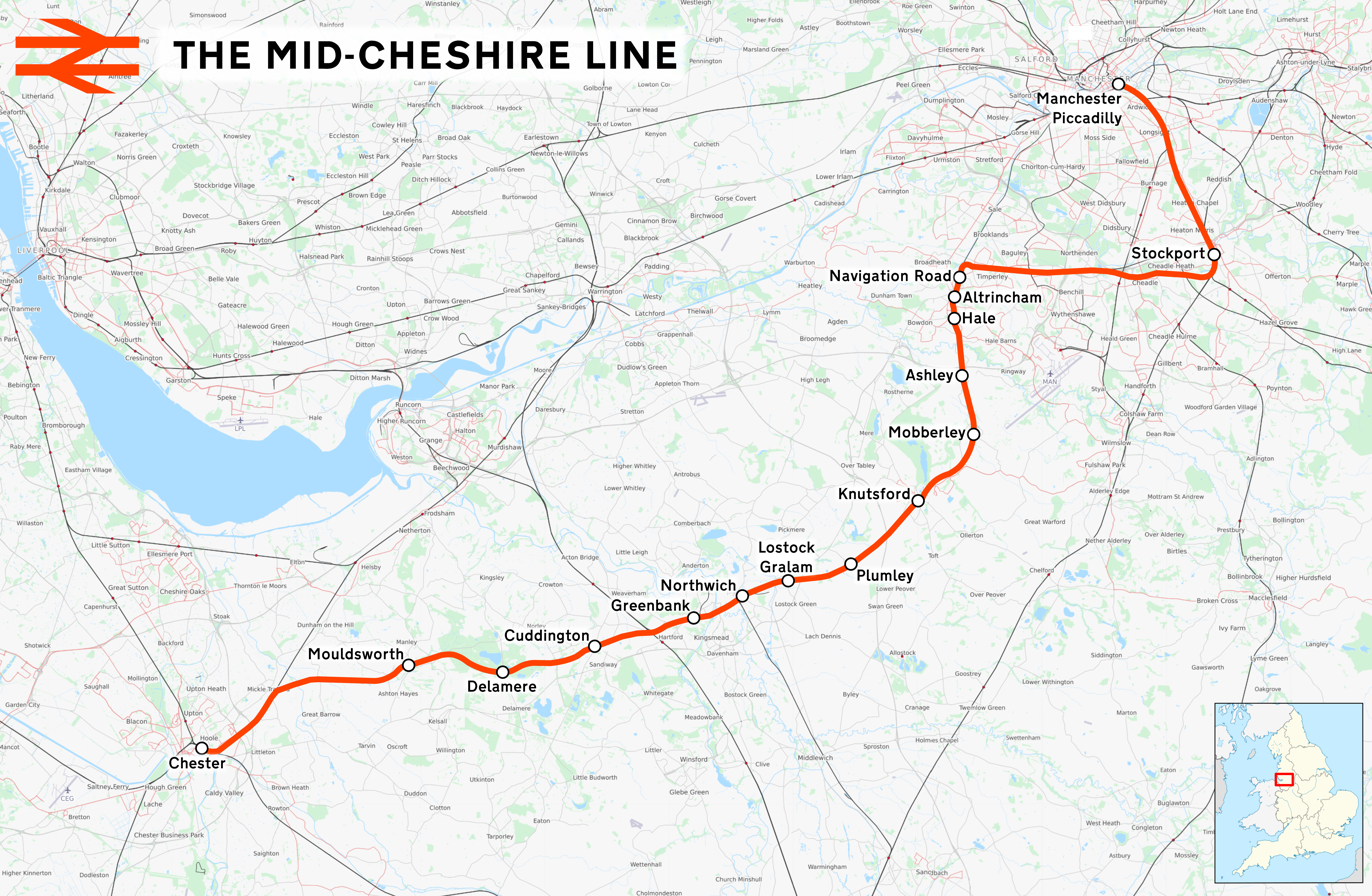
The present route of the Mid-Cheshire line from Chester to Manchester via Stockport

The line through Cheadle High Level was singled in the early 1970s to facilitate the construction of the M63 motorway (now the M60). From 1992, Mid-Cheshire line passenger trains were diverted to run via Stockport and therefore through Cheadle High Level to allow the Altrincham line services to be transferred to Manchester Metrolink; however, Cheadle High Level station was not reopened.

== Proposed new station ==
Following a campaign by local politicians, Cheadle’s Towns Fund Board submitted an application to Stockport Metropolitan Borough Council for a new station for Cheadle on the same site on the Mid-Cheshire line. The station facilities would be built adjacent to the car park of the Alexandra Hospital.

In 2022, the UK government committed £9million funding to the project and the station was expected to open in 2025. It will have a single 100m long platform, providing one train per hour along the Mid-Cheshire line between Manchester Piccadilly and Chester, via Stockport and Altrincham.

By 2026, the cost of reopening the station had risen to £14million, and work had not started. The government confirmed that the proposed station was held up by operational concerns.

Stockport Council announced in Summer 2026 that construction could start within the next 12 months.

On 29 September 2026, Stockport Metropolitan Borough Council announced that an agreement had been reached with the Department for Transport, Network Rail, Northern, and Transport for Greater Manchester to resolve the timetabling issues, allowing preliminary highways and trial hole works to begin on site. Rail industry partners confirmed that further timetabling work would be undertaken so that calling at Cheadle would not require removing existing services at Ashley and Plumley.

Preceding station	National Rail	Following station
	Future Services	
Navigation Road	Northern Trains Mid-Cheshire Line	Stockport
