= Draycott in the Moors =

Village in Staffordshire, England

Coordinates: 52.957°N 2.026°W

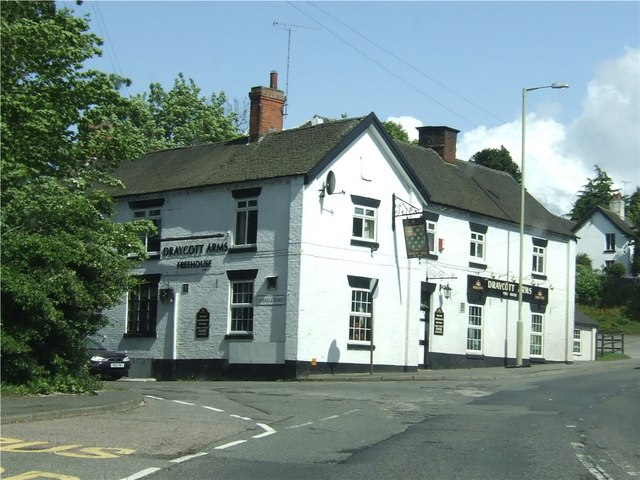
- The Draycott Arms is on the corner of Uttoxeter Road and Cheadle Road

- Location within Staffordshire
- Population: 1,029 (2011)
- Shire county: Staffordshire
- Region: West Midlands
- Country: England
- Sovereign state: United Kingdom
- Post town: Stoke-on-Trent
- Postcode district: ST11
- Dialling code: 01782
- Police: Staffordshire
- Fire: Staffordshire
- Ambulance: West Midlands
- UK Parliament: Stoke-on-Trent South

Draycott in the Moors is a village in Staffordshire, England. It is between Stoke on Trent and Uttoxeter near the River Blythe. It is two and a half miles from Cheadle.

In 1851 the parish contained 518 inhabitants. Sir Edward Vavasour, Bart., was the lord of the manor.

== Notable residents ==
- The recusant Draycot family lived in the parish. Anthony Draycot, priest, died here in 1571.
- Joseph Reeves, a shepherd of this parish, who claimed to have lived to be 127 years old. He said he had never taken tobacco or physic, nor drank between meals, alleviating his thirst by rolling pebbles in his mouth."

== Transport ==
It is near Blythe Bridge railway station on the Crewe–Derby line.

== See also ==
- Listed buildings in Draycott in the Moors
- Cresswell, Staffordshire
