= Cresswell, Staffordshire =

Hamlet in Staffordshire, England

Coordinates: 52.951434°N 2.037614°W

Cresswell
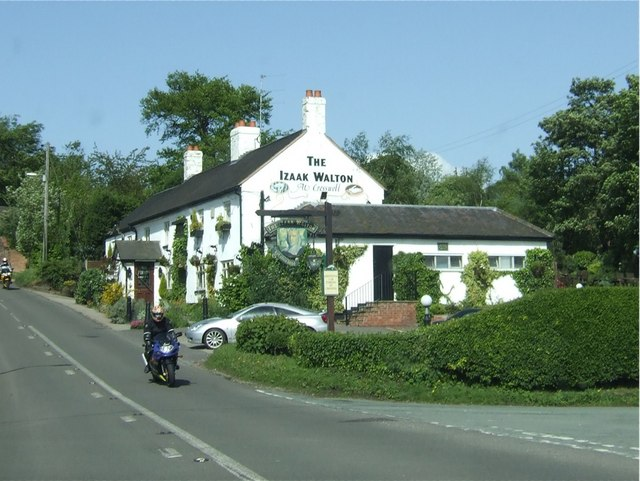
- The Izaak Walton pub

- Location within Staffordshire
- OS grid reference: SJ 9757 3934
- Shire county: Staffordshire
- Region: West Midlands
- Country: England
- Sovereign state: United Kingdom
- Post town: Stoke-on-Trent
- Dialling code: ST11
- Police: Staffordshire
- Fire: Staffordshire
- Ambulance: West Midlands
- UK Parliament: Stone

Cresswell is a hamlet in Staffordshire, England. It is approximately one mile SE of Blythe Bridge and has a population of approximately 300. From the 2011 census the population of this hamlet has been included with Draycott-in-the-Moors.

The "Izaak Walton" public house and restaurant is named after the seventeenth-century fisherman Izaak Walton, whose book The Compleat Angler is still in publication today. Walton was born in Stafford, and legend has it that he fished in the River Blithe, which is near the pub.

During the English Civil War Staffordshire saw a great deal of conflict. The local manor house Paynsley Hall was first held for Charles I, then garrisoned by Parliamentarian forces before being destroyed.

Although it is still a rural area, the hamlet is the home of the Blythe Colour Works, which was established to produce under-glaze colours for the pottery industry. Cresswell is also the home of Blythe Cricket Club.

Cresswell formerly had a railway station on the Crewe to Derby Line, but, although trains still pass through the hamlet, there are now no stations between Blythe Bridge and Uttoxeter. In the twentieth century there was also a short line from Cresswell to Cheadle (Cheadle Branch Line).

== Places of worship ==
Cresswell has an old Roman Catholic community. After the Reformation part of the population worshipped not in the local parish church at Draycott in the Moors, but in a private chapel at Paynsley Hall, whose owners, the Draycot family, remained faithful to the old religion. Anthony Babington (famous for the Babington Plot) married into the Draycot family.

In 1791 Roman Catholicism was legalised in England and St. Mary's Catholic Church was constructed to serve the local Roman Catholics. The church is now served by the clergy of St. Augustine's, Meir, Stoke-on-Trent.

== See also ==
- Listed buildings in Draycott in the Moors
