= Cheadle branch line =

Railway line in Staffordshire, England

The Cheadle branch line was a railway line of just under 4 miles (6.4 km) in length that served the town of Cheadle, Staffordshire. It was in operation as a passenger line from 1892 to 1963, and closed altogether in 1986. It took 46 years from conception to completion and was notable in that part of the line had to be practically rebuilt partway through its existence.

== Proposals for a line ==
Cheadle Railway Act 1878 (Note: Section 1.)
- Act of Parliament
- Parliament of the United Kingdom
- Long title: An Act for incorporation the Cheadle Railway Company, and authorising them to make and maintain the Cheadle Railway; and for other purposes.
- Citation: 41 & 42 Vict. c. clxviii
- Territorial extent: United Kingdom

Dates
- Royal assent: 22 July 1878
- Commencement: 22 July 1878 (Note: The Acts of Parliament (Commencement) Act 1793.)
- Repealed: 12 July 1882
Other legislation
| Repealed by | Cheadle Railway (Abandonment) Act 1882 |

Status: Repealed

Text of statute as originally enacted

Cheadle Railway (Abandonment) Act 1882
- Act of Parliament
- Parliament of the United Kingdom
- Long title: An Act for the abandonment of the Cheadle Railway.
- Citation: 45 & 46 Vict. c. cxxi
- Territorial extent: United Kingdom

Dates
- Royal assent: 12 July 1882
- Commencement: 12 July 1882
- Repealed: 31 January 2013
Other legislation
| Repeals/revokes | Cheadle Railway Act 1878 |
| Repealed by | Statute Law (Repeals) Act 2013 |

Status: Repealed

Text of statute as originally enacted

In 1849 the market town of Cheadle, population 3,000, was still without any form of rail transport. The North Staffordshire Railway (NSR) had completed its Stoke to Derby line in 1848 and the Churnet Valley Line the following year but both of the lines missed the town, passing around 3.5 miles (5.6 km) to the south and north of Cheadle respectively. The people of the town, along with several mines on the Cheadle Coalfield, wanted a rail connection as a means of transporting their goods. Several schemes for a branch line were proposed over the years; among these was a branch from the NSR east of Blythe Bridge and running via Forsbrook to Dilhorne and then Cheadle. Unfortunately, none of the schemes ever came to fruition.

Cheadle Railway Mineral and Land Company Act 1888
- Act of Parliament
- Parliament of the United Kingdom
- Long title: An Act for authorising the Cheadle Railway Mineral and Land Company Limited to construct a Railway in the Parishes of Draycott-in-the-Moors and Cheadle in the County of Stafford; and for other purposes.
- Citation: 51 & 52 Vict. c. clxxxviii
- Territorial extent: United Kingdom

Dates
- Royal assent: 7 August 1888
- Commencement: 7 August 1888

Status: Current legislation

Text of statute as originally enacted

In 1887, the Cheadle Railway, Mineral & Land Co. Ltd was formed, and at long last construction of a branch line leaving the NSR line at Cresswell began the following year, authorised by the Cheadle Railway Mineral and Land Company Act 1888 (51 & 52 Vict. c. clxxxviii). In the meantime, the owners of Foxfield Colliery at Dilhorne had grown tired of waiting for the new line and had built their own connection to the NSR near Blythe Bridge. This line, running entirely over private land and opened in 1893 still survives today as the Foxfield Light Railway, albeit without the connection to the main line.

== Opening ==
The first sod of the line was dug at Totmonslow on 22 March 1888. After several financial problems, the first stretch from Cresswell to Totmonslow was opened on 7 November 1892. The first train ran to Tunstall on the Potteries Loop Line and regular services became an extension of those on the latter for almost the whole of the branch's existence.

Cheadle Railway Mineral and Land Company Act 1893
- Act of Parliament
- Parliament of the United Kingdom
- Long title: An Act to extend the time for the Completion of the authorised Railway of the Cheadle Railway Mineral and Land Company Limited and for other purposes.
- Citation: 56 & 57 Vict. c. lxxxix
- Territorial extent: United Kingdom

Dates
- Royal assent: 29 June 1893
- Commencement: 29 June 1893

Status: Current legislation

Text of statute as originally enacted

Cheadle Railway Company Limited Act 1896
- Act of Parliament
- Parliament of the United Kingdom
- Long title: An Act to make further provisions with respect to the subscription by the North Staffordshire Railway Company to the funds of the Cheadle Railway Mineral and Land Company Limited to confirm certain agreements between those Companies to change the name of the Company and for other purposes.
- Citation: 59 & 60 Vict. c. ccxvi
- Territorial extent: United Kingdom

Dates
- Royal assent: 7 August 1896
- Commencement: 7 August 1896

Status: Current legislation

Text of statute as originally enacted

Construction of the extension to Cheadle started in 1893. A new colliery, christened New Haden Colliery, was opened at Draycott and the line was already in operation for goods traffic up to this point. The new piece of line involved the building of a difficult tunnel. This passed through a ridge of high ground of sandstone before turning east and running to a station on the southern outskirts of Cheadle. The new section was also beset with financial problems and it was not until 1 January 1901 that the line opened in its entirety.

The Cheadle Railway Mineral and Land Company was renamed the Cheadle Railway Company by the Cheadle Railway Company Limited Act 1896 (59 & 60 Vict. c. ccxvi).

In December 1906 Totmonslow station was renamed to Tean, although the village of Upper Tean was located a mile to the east. On 1 January 1907 the North Staffordshire Railway bought the Cheadle Railway Company under the North Staffordshire Railway Act 1907 (7 Edw. 7. c. cxlvii); until that date they had provided the services but not actually owned the line.

== Construction of the diversion line ==
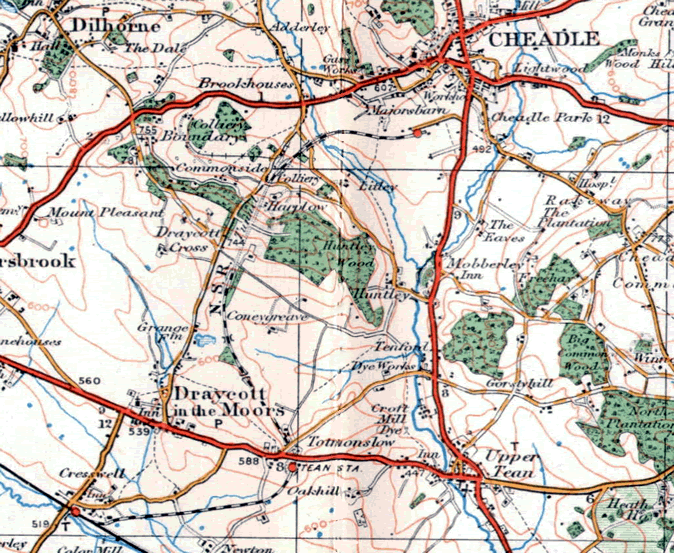
Ordnance Survey map of the branch showing the original alignment c.1921

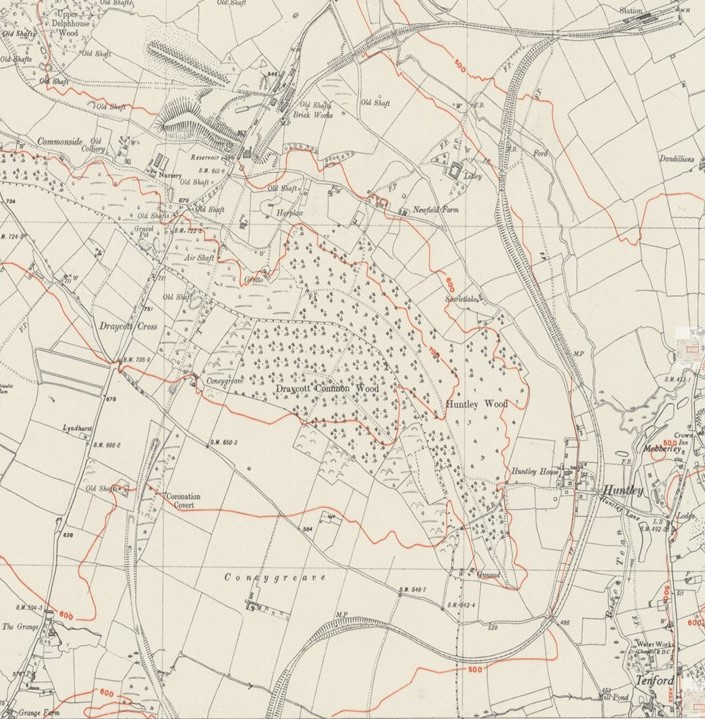
Ordnance Survey map showing both old and new lines, c.1949

Problems with the tunnel began almost immediately after completion. Several sections had to be patched up over the years but in November 1918, partial collapse caused the line to be closed for almost a month. While repairs were underway, the coal traffic was important enough to justify wagons being exchanged between locomotives while inside the tunnel, repairs being carried out by men working on a timber platform with just enough room for the wagons to pass underneath.

After the NSR was absorbed into the London, Midland and Scottish Railway in 1923, problems with the tunnel became even more commonplace and construction of a new deviation line finally began in 1932. This skirted the high ground to the east and joined up with the old formation again just outside Cheadle station; this new alignment was opened in 1933. The tunnel portals were bricked up and the track from the south was lifted soon after, but the northern section of the old line remained in use as a backshunt to New Haden Colliery; all trains to and from the latter would thus need to reverse at Cheadle. The southern portal was used as a small private coal mine which operated from 1983 to 1991 and even though it is bricked much of the mining equipment remains inside the tunnel.

By the beginning of World War II the passenger services had reduced to only two trains per day each way, with five on Saturday. In a further blow, New Haden Colliery was closed in 1943 after the Ministry of Fuel and Power decided to move the 500 miners to more efficient pits in aid of the war effort, and its traffic of 3,000 tons per week was lost. However, a brickworks adjacent to the colliery plus an increasing amount of sand traffic from nearby quarries, most of it delivered by road to Cheadle, provided a lifeline.

== Under British Railways ==
As with many other railways in the county, passenger numbers were dwindling by the 1950s and some lines were closed but the Cheadle branch survived, albeit with only three passenger trains and one goods working each way on weekdays. Tean station closed under British Railways on 1 June 1953; by that time it had been reduced in status to an unstaffed halt. Diesel multiple units started to replace steam traction in 1958 when they were introduced on the Loop Line services, but this did little to stem the decline in passenger numbers. By the time of the Beeching Axe the passenger service was already slated for withdrawal, and the final passenger train on the line ran on Saturday 17 June 1963. The last working was the 5:07pm from Cheadle.

Freight traffic from a nearby quarry continued to run until 1978 when the contract for the traffic expired. From then onwards, goods traffic was solely for railway civil engineering use, at the approximate rate of one train per month, usually hauled by Class 25 diesel locomotives but occasionally class 47's were used, and on a few occasions a class 40. The final train of Engineer's sand ran on 3 November 1984.

== After closure ==
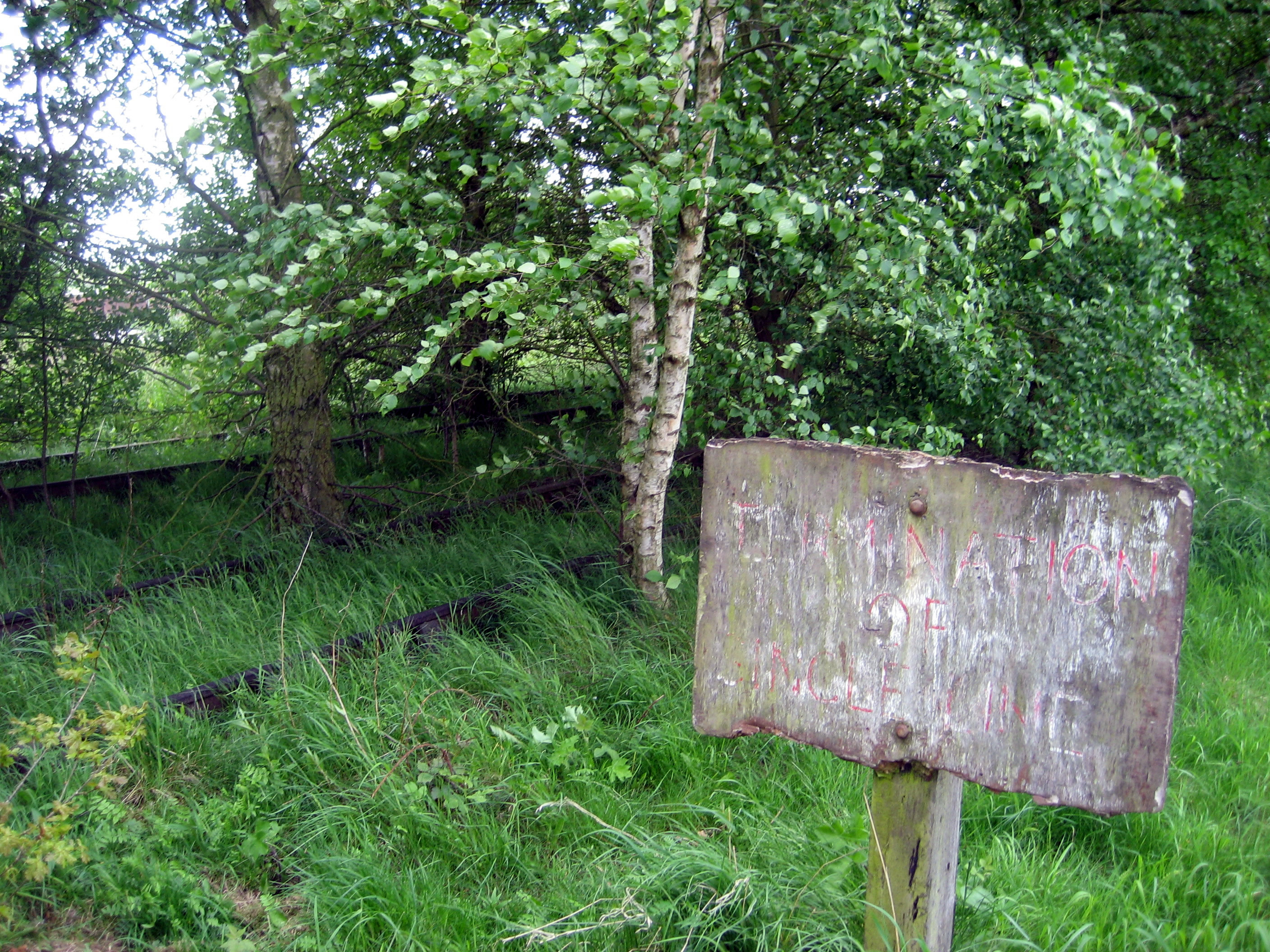
Overgrown track at the Cresswell end of the line

After a gap of nearly 22 years, a passenger train ran to Cheadle on 28 March 1985 to mark the launch of the InterCity Charter Train Unit. The service included several Pullman vehicles and was hauled by a class 47 diesel number 47532. Passengers were taken by road to Alton Towers. The Cheadle branch was chosen by InterCity to show the versatility of the charter service by running on an out of use railway for part of the journey. A regular service to bring in the park's visitors by rail sadly never came to fruition and the line once again became redundant. The last train to Cheadle was a weedkilling train in the summer of 1986. The junction with the main Stoke to Derby line was severed in 1989, thus isolating the Cheadle branch from the national rail network.

Today, most of the alignment is heavily overgrown but still free from development, except for the final quarter of a mile into Cheadle which was lifted in the summer of 1991 and early 1992 to make way for a new housing estate. The northern portal of the tunnel has been buried by opencast mining activity.

In October 2011, Moorland and City Railways set up a company to look into the possibility of reopening the line. A lease has been taken from Network Rail and, in March 2012, overhanging trees were cut back and the remaining track was lifted after it emerged that 600 metres (2,000 feet) of track had been stolen in the period up to Christmas 2011. The trackbed could be reused as a footpath/bridleway pending a decision on the future of the line.

Since 2017, much of the line has found use as a footpath/bridleway, and some signs have been erected which give a brief history of the line including a few photographs of steam and diesel locomotives.

Campaign for Better Transport have added the line to their suggestions for reopening.
