= Warrington Borough Council elections =

Local government elections in Cheshire, England

Warrington Borough Council elections are held every four years. Warrington Borough Council is the local authority for the unitary authority of Warrington in Cheshire, England. Since the last boundary changes in 2016, 58 councillors have been elected from 22 wards.

== Council elections ==
- 1973 Warrington Borough Council election
- 1976 Warrington Borough Council election
- 1979 Warrington Borough Council election (New ward boundaries)
- 1983 Warrington Borough Council election
- 1987 Warrington Borough Council election
- 1991 Warrington Borough Council election (New ward boundaries)
- 1995 Warrington Borough Council election (Borough boundary changes took place but the number of seats remained the same)
- 1997 Warrington Borough Council election (New ward boundaries)
- 1999 Warrington Borough Council election
- 2000 Warrington Borough Council election
- 2001 Warrington Borough Council election
- 2002 Warrington Borough Council election
- 2004 Warrington Borough Council election (New ward boundaries reduced the number of seats by 3)
- 2006 Warrington Borough Council election
- 2007 Warrington Borough Council election
- 2008 Warrington Borough Council election
- 2010 Warrington Borough Council election
- 2011 Warrington Borough Council election
- 2012 Warrington Borough Council election
- 2014 Warrington Borough Council election
- 2015 Warrington Borough Council election
- 2016 Warrington Borough Council election (New ward boundaries and change to holding elections every four years)
- 2021 Warrington Borough Council election (postponed from 2020 due to COVID-19 pandemic)
- 2024 Warrington Borough Council election

== Results maps ==
2004 results map

2006 results map

2007 results map

2008 results map

2010 results map

2011 results map

2012 results map

2014 results map

2015 results map

2016 results map

2021 results map

2024 results map

== By-election results ==
=== 1997–2000 ===
Rixton and Woolston By-Election 7 January 1999
Party	Candidate	Votes	%	±%
Labour	Edmund Coop	762	59.2	+0.2
Conservative	Alan Freeman	381	29.6	+1.0
Liberal Democrats	George Hill	145	11.3	−1.2
Majority		381	29.6	
Turnout		1,288	16.8	
Labour hold		Swing		

=== 2000–2004 ===
Poulton North By-Election 18 September 2003
Party	Candidate	Votes	%	±%
Liberal Democrats	Michael Cragg	698	51.6	+28.2
Labour	Michael Curran	498	37.0	−18.9
Conservative	Howard Greenwood	151	11.2	−9.6
Majority		200	14.6	
Turnout		1,347	19.9	
Liberal Democrats gain from Labour		Swing		

=== 2004–2008 ===
Poulton North By-Election 7 September 2006
Party	Candidate	Votes	%	±%
Liberal Democrats	Sharon Wilson	1,358	64.2	+19.8
Labour	Kevin Bennett	505	23.9	−13.4
Conservative	Francine Leslie	209	9.9	−8.4
Green	Michael Jackson	43	2.0	+2.0
Majority		853	40.3	
Turnout		2,115	27.5	
Liberal Democrats gain from Labour		Swing		

=== 2008–2012 ===
Bewsey and Whitecross By-Election 9 December 2010
Party	Candidate	Votes	%	±%
Labour	Jeff Richards	1,032	71.1	+18.1
Liberal Democrats	Ann Raymond	221	15.2	−16.5
Conservative	Lance Reah	118	8.1	−7.1
Green	Lyndsay McAteer	47	3.2	+3.2
Independent	John Mulhall	33	2.3	+2.3
Majority		811	55.9	
Turnout		1,451		
Labour gain from Liberal Democrats		Swing		

Poulton North By-Election 28 July 2011
Party	Candidate	Votes	%	±%
Liberal Democrats	Colin Oliver	1,106	48.3	+9.1
Labour	Ashley Pemberton	895	39.1	−7.8
Conservative	Mark Chapman	190	8.3	−5.6
UKIP	James Ashington	97	4.2	+4.2
Majority		211	9.2	
Turnout		2,288		
Liberal Democrats hold		Swing		

Poulton North By-Election 17 November 2011
Party	Candidate	Votes	%	±%
Liberal Democrats	Sandra Bradshaw	776	44.7	−3.6
Labour	Billy Lines-Rowlands	733	42.2	+3.1
Conservative	Mark Chapman	147	8.5	+0.2
UKIP	James Ashington	79	4.6	+0.4
Majority		43	2.5	
Turnout		1,735		
Liberal Democrats hold		Swing		

=== 2016–2021 ===
Chapelford and Old Hall By-Election 12 October 2017
Party	Candidate	Votes	%	±%
Labour	Paul Warburton	957	55.3	+10.4
Conservative	Phil Hayward	333	19.2	+1.3
Liberal Democrats	Allan Bird	312	18.0	−3.0
UKIP	Ian Wilson	86	5.0	−5.0
Green	Stephanie Davies	43	2.5	−3.7
Majority		624	36.0	+9.1
Turnout		1,731	19.93	−11.07
Labour hold				

Lymm South By-Election 19 April 2018
Party	Candidate	Votes	%	±%
Liberal Democrats	Anna Fradgley	769	42.8	+10.4
Conservative	Stephen Taylor	649	36.2	−2.3
Labour	Trish Cockayne	328	18.3	−1.1
UKIP	James Ashington	25	1.4	−8.3
Green	Michael Wass	24	1.3	+1.3
Majority		120	6.6	+12.7
Turnout		1,795	37.5	−6.5
Liberal Democrats gain from Conservative				

Penketh and Cuerdley By-Election 11 October 2018
Party	Candidate	Votes	%	±%
Independent	Geoff Fellows	784	36.1	+36.1
Labour	Kenny Watson	691	31.8	−19.0
Conservative	Philip Hayward	479	22.1	−19.1
Liberal Democrats	David Crowther	100	4.6	−3.4
UKIP	Ian Wilson	69	3.2	+3.2
Green	Stephanie Davies	47	2.2	+2.2
Majority		93	4.3	+17.1
Turnout		2,170	25.89	−11.11
Independent gain from Labour				

Burtonwood and Winwick By-Election 6 February 2020
Party	Candidate	Votes	%	±%
Labour	Alex Abbey	753	58.9	−3.1
Conservative	Paul Campbell	469	36.7	+13.9
Independent	Trevor Nicholls	56	4.4	+4.4
Majority		284	22.2	+10.8
Turnout		1,278	25.2	−8.8
Labour hold				

=== 2021–2024 ===
Grappenhall By-Election 29 September 2022 (2 seats)
Party	Candidate	Votes	%	±%
Liberal Democrats	Helen Speed	1,073	52.3	+3.6
Liberal Democrats	Mark Browne	1,047	41.9	+0.5
Conservative	Moira Dolan	524	20.9	−17.5
Conservative	Phillip Ford	462	18.5	−10.8
Labour	Denis Matthews	193	7.7	−1.8
Green	Denise Harris	135	5.4	−1.7
Turnout		2,502	44.3	−5.1
Liberal Democrats hold				
Liberal Democrats hold				

Rixton and Woolston By-Election 24 November 2022
Party	Candidate	Votes	%	±%
Conservative	Rob Tynan	648	42.9	+2.8
Labour	Trish Cockayne	645	42.7	+5.5
Liberal Democrats	Brian Meichen	219	14.5	+5.0
Majority		3	0.2	−2.7
Turnout		1,512	20.52	−18.38
Conservative hold				

Latchford West By-Election 20 April 2023
Party	Candidate	Votes	%	±%
Labour	Denis Matthews	662	40.8	−6.8
Conservative	Stephen Taylor	488	30.1	−11.4
Liberal Democrats	Sharon Harris	274	16.9	+6.1
Independent	Amanda Bowles	199	12.3	+12.3
Majority		174	10.7	−18.2
Turnout		1,623	28.3	−7.77
Labour hold				

Poulton North By-Election 27 July 2023
Party	Candidate	Votes	%	±%
Labour	Una Gillham	999	56.3	+22.3
Conservative	Howard Klein	606	34.2	+10.9
Liberal Democrats	Timothy Harwood	168	9.5	+3.6
Majority		393	22.2	+11.4
Turnout		1,773	23.05	−10.92
Labour hold				

=== 2024–2028 ===
Great Sankey North and Whittle Hall By-Election 1 May 2025
Party	Candidate	Votes	%	±%
Labour	Charlotte Bond	775	27.8	−13.5
Reform	Carl Knapper	745	26.7	N/A
Independent	Nigel John Catlow	636	22.8	−14.5
Liberal Democrats	Allan Bird	383	13.7	+4.3
Conservative	Chuck Eriobuna	248	8.9	−6.4
Majority		30	1.1	
Turnout		2,793	32.00	−4.22
Labour hold				

Bewsey and Whitecross By-Election 31 July 2025
Party	Candidate	Votes	%	±%
Reform	John Roddy	752	43.7	N/A
Labour	Maitane Akpan	631	36.6	−17.4
Liberal Democrats	David Crowther	223	13.0	−9.0
Conservative	Stephen Howard Taylor	116	6.7	−12.4
Majority		121	7.1	
Turnout		1,722	18.00	−2.9
Reform gain from Labour				
