= 2024 Warrington Borough Council election =

2024 election in Warrington, England

- 2 May 2024

All 58 seats to Warrington Borough Council 30 seats needed for a majority

	First party	Second party
Leader	Hans Mundry	Bob Barr
Party	Labour	Liberal Democrats
Last election	35 seats, 38.9%	9 seats, 16.0%
Seats before	36	8
Seats won	42	12
Seat change	▲6	▲4
Popular vote	54,208	19,705
Percentage	47.3%	17.2%
Swing	▲8.4%	▲1.2%
	Third party	Fourth party
Leader		Nigel Balding
Party	Independent	Conservative
Last election	3 seats, 6.1%	11 seats, 36.6%
Seats before	4	10
Seats won	3	1
Seat change	▼1	▼9
Popular vote	7,598	29,261
Percentage	6.6%	25.5%
Swing	▲0.5%	▼11.1%
- Winner of each seat at the 2024 Warrington Borough Council election
Leader before election
Hans Mundry
Labour
Leader after election
Hans Mundry
Labour

The 2024 Warrington Borough Council election was held on Thursday 2 May 2024 to elect members of Warrington Borough Council in England. It took place on the same day as other local elections in the United Kingdom.

== Background ==
In the 2021 Warrington Borough Council election, the Labour Party retained overall control of the council but lost 10 seats. Before the election, Labour had 36 Seats and the opposition having 22 seats.

Pre-Election Council Composition
Graph of the party split among 58 seats.
Party	Seats
Labour Party	36
Conservative Party	10
Liberal Democrats	8
Independents	4

== Councillors standing down ==
Councillor	Ward	First elected	Party	Date announced
Russ Bowden	Birchwood	2010	Labour	28 October 2023
Cathy Mitchell	Burtonwood & Winwick	2016	Labour	29 October 2023
Amanda King	Great Sankey South	2016	Independent (elected Labour)	28 January 2024
Kath Buckley	Lymm South	2015	Conservative	7 March 2024
Wendy Maisey	Culcheth, Glazebury & Croft	2021	Conservative	25 March 2024
David Ellis	Birchwood	2021	Labour	6 April 2024
Sarah Hall	Bewsey & Whitecross	2016	Labour Co-op	6 April 2024
Alex Abbey	Burtonwood & Winwick	2020	Labour	6 April 2024
Maureen Creaghan	Poulton South	2014	Labour	6 April 2024
Linda Butler	Chapelford & Old Hall	2021	Conservative	6 April 2024
Bob Barr	Lymm North & Thelwall	2006	Liberal Democrats	6 April 2024
Claire Lloyd-Fitzgerald	Orford	2021	Labour	6 April 2024
Morgan Tarr	Orford	2016	Labour	6 April 2024
Andrew Hill	Rixton & Woolston	2016	Labour	6 April 2024

There were also six Councillors who were elected in 2021 that stood in different Wards in 2024.

Councillor	Party	Ward elected to in 2021	Ward stood in 2024
Siobhan Carr	Labour	Westbrook	Burtonwood & Winwick
Hilary Cooksey	Labour	Poplars & Hulme	Rixton & Woolston
Brian Gallagher	Labour	Westbrook	Penketh & Cuerdley
Helen Milner	Labour	Orford	Lymm North & Thelwall
Peter Walker	Liberal Democrats	Stockton Heath	Appleton
Jane Whalen	Labour	Great Sankey North & Whittle Hall	Appleton

== Post-election ==
The Labour Party held control of the council, increasing their majority from 36 to 42. The Liberal Democrats became the official opposition by increasing their seats from 8 to 12. Their group leader prior to the election, Bob Barr, did not stand for re-election; after the election they chose Mark Browne to be their new group leader and therefore the leader of the opposition on the council. The Conservatives, who had been the official opposition prior to the election, lost 9 seats, including their group leader Nigel Balding, leaving only one Conservative on the council.

After the election, Labour had 42 seats and the opposition had 16 seats.

Post-Election Council Composition
Graph of the party split among 58 seats.
Party	Seats
Labour Party	42
Liberal Democrats	12
Independents	3
Conservative Party	1

== Summary ==
=== Election result ===
2024 Warrington Borough Council election
Party	Candidates	Seats	Gains	Losses	Net gain/loss	Seats %	Votes %	Votes	+/−
Labour	51	42	7	2	▲6	72.4	47.3	54,208	+8.4
Liberal Democrats	19	12	4	0	▲4	20.7	17.2	19,705	+1.2
Independent	10	3	2	1	▼1	5.2	6.6	7,598	+0.5
Conservative	47	1	0	10	▼9	1.7	25.5	29,261	–11.1
Reform	5	0	0	0	Steady	0.0	1.8	2,045	N/A
Green	5	0	0	0	Steady	0.0	1.6	1,822	–0.7

== Ward results ==
Incumbent councillors in the Ward are denoted by an asterisk (*).

=== Appleton ===
Appleton (3 seats)
Party	Candidate	Votes	%	±%
Liberal Democrats	Laura Booth	1,999	60.7	+22.5
Liberal Democrats	Peter John Walker	1,906	57.9	+21.5
Liberal Democrats	Matt Scott	1,440	43.7	+8.6
Conservative	Mark Christopher Jervis*	1,165	35.4	–12.1
Conservative	Ghazala Chapman*	1,040	31.6	–15.1
Conservative	Kenneth David Critchley*	997	30.3	–14.9
Labour	Jane Whalen	518	15.7	+3.3
Turnout		3,292	39.3	–11.3
Liberal Democrats gain from Conservative				
Liberal Democrats gain from Conservative				
Liberal Democrats gain from Conservative				

=== Bewsey & Whitecross ===
Bewsey & Whitecross (3 seats)
Party	Candidate	Votes	%	±%
Labour Co-op	Steve Wright*	1,151	61.2	+8.0
Labour Co-op	Tom Jennings*	1,133	60.2	+13.1
Labour Co-op	Shireen Saeed Mohammed	1,015	54.0	+0.8
Liberal Democrats	David Crowther	414	22.0	+4.7
Conservative	Cecilia Margaret Critchley	378	20.1	−3.0
Conservative	Lisa Charlotte Thompson	365	19.4	−0.4
Conservative	Barbara May Price	359	19.1	+1.6
Turnout		1,881	20.9	–1.9
Labour hold				
Labour hold				
Labour hold				

Note: In June 2025, Cllr Shireen Mohammed announced she would be stepping down, triggering a by-election

=== Birchwood ===
Birchwood (3 seats)
Party	Candidate	Votes	%	±%
Labour	Kuldeep Singh Dhillon	1,454	53.8	+1.6
Labour	Balbir Kaur Dhillon	1,448	53.6	+5.9
Labour	Tim Price	1,436	53.1	+16.3
Conservative	Nigel William Balding*	891	33.0	−4.0
Conservative	Craig Peter Allen	626	23.2	–13.5
Conservative	Neil Anthony Murphy	536	19.8	–5.7
Reform	Dion Challinor	428	15.8	N/A
Turnout		2,703	33.13	–1.92
Labour hold				
Labour hold				
Labour gain from Conservative				

=== Burtonwood & Winwick ===
Burtonwood & Winwick (2 seats)
Party	Candidate	Votes	%	±%
Labour	Kevin Burgess	841	48.7	−5.4
Independent	Stuart David Mann	714	41.4	N/A
Labour	Siobhan Carr	614	35.6	–17.0
Independent	Theresa-Jane Murray	553	32.0	+1.0
Green	Maddison Stacey Wheeldon	198	11.5	N/A
Conservative	Stewart Anthony Gardiner	169	9.8	–22.0
Turnout		1,726	34.73	–1.65
Labour hold				
Independent gain from Labour				

Note: One of the Independent candidates, Theresa-Jane Murray, stood in the 2021 election as a Conservative candidate.

=== Chapelford & Old Hall ===
Chapelford & Old Hall (3 seats)
Party	Candidate	Votes	%	±%
Labour Co-op	Steve Parish*	1,521	55.7	+13.9
Labour Co-op	Paul Warburton*	1,394	51.0	+10.5
Labour Co-op	Barbara Pete-Echieh	1,163	42.6	+5.5
Conservative	Blake Cooper	935	34.2	−3.5
Conservative	Gavin Hepherd-Hall	737	27.0	–6.2
Conservative	Nisha Jethalal Shah	692	25.3	–5.7
Liberal Democrats	Allan Keith Bird	446	16.3	–3.1
Green	Bec Hutton-Riedijk	381	13.9	–2.0
Turnout		2,732	31.66	–2.02
Labour hold				
Labour hold				
Labour gain from Conservative				

=== Culcheth, Glazebury & Croft ===
Culcheth, Glazebury & Croft (3 seats)
Party	Candidate	Votes	%	±%
Labour	Matt Smith	1,763	52.8	+13.8
Labour	Neil Johnson	1,694	50.7	+14.5
Labour	Janet Seddon	1,691	50.6	+21.6
Conservative	Carol Ruth Benson*	1,457	43.6	–5.1
Conservative	Valerie Margaret Allen*	1,374	41.1	–7.2
Conservative	Alicia Edwards	1,256	37.6	–8.7
Turnout		3,341	39.51	–5.92
Labour gain from Conservative				
Labour gain from Conservative				
Labour gain from Conservative				

=== Fairfield & Howley ===
Fairfield & Howley (3 seats)
Party	Candidate	Votes	%	±%
Labour	Jean Flaherty*	1,271	68.7	+8.2
Labour	Tony Higgins*	1,167	63.1	+9.9
Labour	Sagheer Zaman*	1,049	56.7	+12.2
Reform	Dave Fowler	423	22.9	N/A
Conservative	Daniel Thompson	345	18.6	–8.5
Turnout		1,850	22.03	–1.35
Labour hold				
Labour hold				
Labour hold				

=== Grappenhall ===
Grappenhall (2 seats)
Party	Candidate	Votes	%	±%
Liberal Democrats	Mark Damen Browne*	1,184	51.9	+2.8
Liberal Democrats	Helen Speed*	1,160	50.9	+9.1
Conservative	Andrew Freeman	583	25.6	–13.1
Conservative	Joanne Freeman	573	25.1	–4.4
Labour	Dave Cundy	463	20.3	+10.7
Green	Michael Caldow	282	12.4	+5.3
Turnout		2,281	37.80	–11.60
Liberal Democrats hold				
Liberal Democrats hold				

=== Great Sankey North & Whittle Hall ===
Great Sankey North & Whittle Hall (3 seats)
Party	Candidate	Votes	%	±%
Labour Co-op	Janet Henshaw*	1,365	43.9	+9.6
Labour Co-op	Hitesh Patel*	1,319	42.4	+3.4
Labour Co-op	Marcus Cameron	1,285	41.3	+0.9
Independent	Nigel John Catlow	1,159	37.3	+12.7
Conservative	Julie Groom	606	19.5	–8.6
Conservative	Chi Kuong-Kwan	592	19.0	–7.1
Green	Stephanie Davies	568	18.3	+3.6
Conservative	Brodie Mitchell	477	15.3	–6.7
Turnout		3,108	36.22	–1.12
Labour hold				
Labour hold				
Labour hold				

=== Great Sankey South ===
Great Sankey South (3 seats)
Party	Candidate	Votes	%	±%
Labour	Laura Watson*	1,378	60.9	+4.3
Labour	Mo Hussain*	1,256	55.5	+0.9
Labour	Leah Hussain	1,243	54.9	−5.6
Conservative	Andrew David Pennington	490	21.6	–15.1
Conservative	Moira Dolan	422	18.6	–15.6
Conservative	Caleb Michael Lovegrove	389	17.2	–14.9
Liberal Democrats	Anthony James Tobin	346	15.3	N/A
Liberal Democrats	Roy Alfred Smith	319	14.1	−1.1
Turnout		2,264	27.54	–2.56
Labour hold				
Labour hold				
Labour hold				

=== Latchford East ===
Latchford East (2 seats)
Party	Candidate	Votes	%	±%
Labour Co-op	Karen Mundry*	880	63.9	+4.3
Labour Co-op	Hans Josef Mundry*	847	61.5	+1.6
Conservative	Heather Winifred Allan	294	21.4	–3.1
Conservative	Carl Andrew Olsen	256	18.6	–5.8
Liberal Democrats	Vicki Duncan	242	17.6	+7.9
Turnout		1,377	21.18	–2.87
Labour hold				
Labour hold				

=== Latchford West ===
Latchford West (2 seats)
Party	Candidate	Votes	%	±%
Labour Co-op	Maureen McLaughlin*	915	53.5	+10.4
Labour Co-op	Denis James Thomas Matthews*	875	51.1	+10.4
Conservative	Stephen Howard Taylor	565	33.0	–4.3
Conservative	Marc Turner	504	29.5	–8.1
Liberal Democrats	Tim Jordan	232	13.6	+3.8
Turnout		1,711	30.01	–6.06
Labour hold				
Labour hold				

=== Lymm North & Thelwall ===
Lymm North & Thelwall (3 seats)
Party	Candidate	Votes	%	±%
Liberal Democrats	Ian George Marks*	2,014	61.3	+9.7
Liberal Democrats	Bob Hignett	1,848	56.2	+4.0
Liberal Democrats	Wendy Johnson*	1,817	55.3	+12.7
Labour	Helen Charlotte Milner	819	24.9	+2.8
Conservative	Carole Margaret Pemberton	802	24.4	−5.3
Conservative	Sue Farrington	687	20.9	−8.8
Conservative	Calum Higginson	616	18.7	−8.3
Turnout		3,286	36.53	−8.57
Liberal Democrats hold				
Liberal Democrats hold				
Liberal Democrats hold				

=== Lymm South ===
Lymm South (2 seats)
Party	Candidate	Votes	%	±%
Liberal Democrats	Graham Farrington Gowland*	1,144	58.4	+18.0
Liberal Democrats	Luke William Stuttard	816	41.7	+6.2
Conservative	Ian Pemberton	639	32.6	−1.4
Conservative	Phillip Martin Ford	532	27.2	−17.2
Labour	Sara Frith	432	22.1	+7.0
Turnout		1,958	38.62	−11.05
Liberal Democrats hold				
Liberal Democrats gain from Conservative				

=== Orford ===
Orford (3 seats)
Party	Candidate	Votes	%	±%
Labour	Dave Appleton	1,039	51.9	+6.9
Labour	Emily Russon	981	49.0	+6.3
Labour	Robin Michael David Frith	948	47.4	+10.2
Independent	Carol Kilgannon	806	40.3	+6.8
Reform	Trevor Nicholls	476	23.8	+8.7
Conservative	David Bent	262	13.1	−20.4
Turnout		2,001	23.17	−3.01
Labour hold				
Labour hold				
Labour hold				

Note: The Independent candidate Carol Kilgannon stood in the 2021 election as a Conservative candidate.

=== Penketh & Cuerdley ===
Penketh & Cuerdley (3 seats)
Party	Candidate	Votes	%	±%
Independent	Eunice Peters	1,144	39.0	N/A
Labour	Jacob Barnard	1,130	38.5	+8.8
Independent	Geoff Fellows*	986	33.6	−6.2
Labour	Brian Gallagher	888	30.3	+1.1
Labour	Martin Paul McManus	841	28.7	+5.1
Independent	Craig Joseph Lenihan*	685	23.3	−15.6
Independent	Andy Heaver*	620	21.1	−21.0
Independent	Christine Wych	484	16.5	N/A
Conservative	Joanne Ellen Baxter	468	15.9	−11.1
Conservative	Chuck Eriobuna	390	13.3	−9.4
Conservative	Paula Wilkinson	316	10.8	−8.6
Liberal Democrats	Katie Barr	150	5.1	+1.0
Turnout		2,935	36.39	−6.35
Independent gain from Independent				
Labour gain from Independent				
Independent hold				

=== Poplars & Hulme ===
Poplars & Hulme (3 seats)
Party	Candidate	Votes	%	±%
Labour	Nathan Sudworth*	1,004	63.7	+5.5
Labour	John Kerr-Brown*	894	56.8	+4.4
Labour	Gemma Southern	825	52.4	+3.1
Reform	Dennis James Cornwell	402	25.5	N/A
Conservative	Anthony Douglas Muir	278	17.7	−14.4
Turnout		1,575	18.67	−1.86
Labour hold				
Labour hold				
Labour hold				

=== Poulton North ===
Poulton North (3 seats)
Party	Candidate	Votes	%	±%
Labour	Graham Jeffrey Friend*	1,259	61.2	+19.7
Labour	Sue Emery*	1,172	57.0	+21.7
Labour	Una Bernadette Gillham*	1,166	56.7	+13.5
Conservative	Michael Millington	711	34.6	+4.9
Turnout		2,056	27.06	−6.91
Labour hold				
Labour hold				
Labour hold				

=== Poulton South ===
Poulton South (2 seats)
Party	Candidate	Votes	%	±%
Labour	Rebecca Knowles	841	62.6	+14.3
Labour	Steven Rydzkowski*	825	61.4	+15.8
Conservative	Andrew David Jones	448	33.3	−3.1
Turnout		1,344	28.29	−5.92
Labour hold				
Labour hold				

=== Rixton & Woolston ===
Rixton & Woolston (3 seats)
Party	Candidate	Votes	%	±%
Conservative	Rob Tynan*	977	40.9	+4.9
Labour	Hilary Cooksey	973	40.7	+1.6
Labour	Lawrence Sheridan	879	36.8	+0.7
Conservative	Gary Rushby	782	32.7	−9.5
Labour	Sheejo Varghese	738	30.9	−1.9
Conservative	Howard Klein	730	30.5	−7.4
Independent	Phil Eastty*	447	18.7	−19.2
Green	Karen Wild	393	16.4	N/A
Reform	Geoffrey Siddall	316	13.2	N/A
Turnout		2,391	32.61	−6.29
Conservative hold				
Labour hold				
Labour gain from Conservative				

Note: The Independent candidate Phil Eastty was elected in the 2021 election as a Conservative candidate. He then defected to Labour.

=== Stockton Heath ===
Stockton Heath (2 seats)
Party	Candidate	Votes	%	±%
Liberal Democrats	Judith Wheeler*	1,210	56.0	+17.1
Liberal Democrats	Sharon Harris	1,018	47.1	+8.7
Labour	Laurence James Murphy	634	29.4	+10.0
Conservative	Seb Sheldon	537	24.9	−9.1
Conservative	Lyndsey Jane Olsen	440	20.4	−11.8
Turnout		2,160	39.00	−7.27
Liberal Democrats hold				
Liberal Democrats hold				

=== Westbrook ===
Westbrook (2 seats)
Party	Candidate	Votes	%	±%
Labour	Marc Victor Rufus	925	58.5	+24.0
Labour	Kate Eglinton	846	53.5	+21.1
Conservative	Gavin Ruben	573	36.3	+4.4
Turnout		1,580	31.16	−5.77
Labour hold				
Labour hold				

== Changes 2024–2028 ==
- October 2024: Cllr Neil Johnson resigned from Labour over a proposed transit site; he now sits as an Independent.
- February 2026: Cllr John Roddy defected to the Conservatives from Reform UK.

=== By-elections ===
==== Great Sankey North & Whittle Hall ====
Great Sankey North & Whittle Hall: 1 May 2025 (1 seat)
Party	Candidate	Votes	%	±%
Labour	Charlotte Bond	775	27.8	−13.5
Reform	Carl Knapper	745	26.7	N/A
Independent	Nigel John Catlow	636	22.8	−14.5
Liberal Democrats	Allan Bird	383	13.7	+4.3
Conservative	Chuck Eriobuna	248	8.9	−6.4
Majority		30	1.1	
Turnout		2,793	32.1	−4.12
Labour hold				

The seat was vacated when Labour councillor Janet Henshaw, the former deputy leader of the council, resigned at the end of March 2025, citing the need to prioritise her own health, well-being and that of her family.

==== Bewsey & Whitecross ====
Bewsey & Whitecross: 31 July 2025 (1 seat)
Party	Candidate	Votes	%	±%
Reform	John Roddy	752	43.7	N/A
Labour	Maitane Akpan	631	36.6	−17.4
Liberal Democrats	David Crowther	223	13.0	−9.0
Conservative	Stephen Howard Taylor	116	6.7	−12.4
Majority		121	7.0	
Turnout		1,731	17.7	−3.2
Reform gain from Labour				

The seat was vacated when Labour councillor Shireen Mohammed resigned to take up a direct employment role with Warrington Borough Council.

== See also ==
- 2024 Warrington parish and town council elections
