= List of schools in Warrington =

This is a list of schools in Borough of Warrington in the English county of Cheshire, England.

== State-funded schools ==
=== Primary schools ===
- Alderman Bolton Primary School, Latchford
- Appleton Thorn Primary School, Appleton Thorn
- Barrow Hall Community Primary School, Great Sankey
- Beamont Primary School, Warrington
- Bewsey Lodge Primary School, Bewsey
- Birchwood CE Primary School, Birchwood
- Bradshaw Community Primary School, Grappenhall
- Brook Acre Community Primary School, Padgate
- Broomfields Junior School, Appleton
- Bruche Primary School Academy, Padgate
- Burtonwood Community Primary School, Burtonwood
- Callands Primary School, Warrington
- Chapelford Village Primary School, Great Sankey
- Cherry Tree Primary School, Lymm
- Christ Church CE Primary School, Padgate
- Cinnamon Brow CE Primary School, Fearnhead
- The Cobbs Infant and Nursery School, Appleton
- Croft Primary School, Croft
- Culcheth Community Primary School, Culcheth
- Dallam Community Primary School, Dallam
- Evelyn Street Primary School, Warrington
- Glazebury CE Primary School, Glazebury
- Gorse Covert Primary School, Birchwood
- Grappenhall Heys Community Primary School, Grappenhall
- Grappenhall St Wilfrid's CE Primary School, Grappenhall
- Great Sankey Primary School, Great Sankey
- Latchford St James CE Primary School, Latchford
- Locking Stumps Community Primary School, Birchwood
- Meadowside Community Primary and Nursery School, Longford
- Newchurch Community Primary School, Culcheth
- Oakwood Avenue Community Primary School, Warrington
- Oughtrington Primary School, Lymm
- Our Lady's RC Primary School, Latchford
- Park Road Community Primary School, Great Sankey
- Penketh Community Primary School, Penketh
- Penketh South Community Primary School, Penketh
- Ravenbank Primary School, Lymm
- Sacred Heart RC Primary School, Warrington
- St Alban's RC Primary School, Warrington
- St Andrew's CE Primary School, Orford
- St Augustine's RC Primary School, Latchford
- St Benedict's RC Primary School, Warrington
- St Bridget's RC Primary School, Fearnhead
- St Elphin's (Fairfield) CE Primary School, Warrington
- St Helen's CE Primary School, Hollins Green
- St Joseph's RC Primary School, Penketh
- St Lewis' RC Primary School, Croft
- St Margaret's CE Primary School, Orford
- St Monica's RC Primary School, Appleton
- St Oswald's RC Primary School, Padgate
- St Paul of The Cross RC Primary School, Warrington
- St Peter's RC Primary School, Woolston
- St Philip (Westbrook) CE Primary School, Woolston
- St Stephen's RC Primary School, Orford
- St Thomas' CE Primary School, Stockton Heath
- St Vincent's RC Primary School, Penketh
- Sankey Valley St James CE Primary School, Great Sankey
- Statham Primary School, Lymm
- Stockton Heath Primary School, Stockton Heath
- Stretton St Matthew's CE Primary School, Stretton
- Thelwall Infant School, Thelwal
- Thelwall Community Junior School, Thelwal
- Twiss Green Community Primary School, Culcheth
- Warrington St Ann's CE Primary School, Orford
- Warrington St Barnabas' CE Primary School, Warrington
- Westbrook Old Hall Primary School, Warrington
- Winwick CE Primary School, Winwick
- Woolston CE Primary School, Woolston
- Woolston Community Primary School, Woolston

=== Secondary schools ===
- Beamont Collegiate Academy, Orford
- Birchwood Community High School, Birchwood
- Bridgewater High School, Appleton
- Cardinal Newman Catholic High School, Latchford
- Culcheth High School, Culcheth
- Great Sankey High School, Great Sankey
- King's Leadership Academy Warrington, Woolston
- Lymm High School, Lymm
- Padgate Academy, Padgate
- Penketh High School, Penketh
- St Gregory's Catholic High School, Westbrook
- Sir Thomas Boteler Church of England High School, Latchford
- UTC Warrington, Warrington

=== Special and alternative schools ===
- Fox Wood Special School, Woolston
- Green Lane Community Special School, Woolston
- Kassia Academy and Support Services, Padgate

=== Further education ===
- Priestley College, Wilderspool
- Warrington and Vale Royal College, Warrington

== Independent schools ==
=== Special and alternative schools ===
- Birchwood School, Birchwood
- Bright Futures, Lymm
- Chaigeley School, Thelwall
