= 2015 Warrington Borough Council election =

2015 UK local government election

← 2014	7 May 2015	2016 →

19 out of 57 seats for Warrington Borough Council 29 seats needed for a majority
	First party	Second party	Third party
Party	Labour	Liberal Democrats	Conservative
Seats before	40	11	3
Seats won	12	2	3
Seats after	39	9	5
Seat change	▲1	▼2	▲2
Popular vote	36,697	16,456	27,349
Percentage	38.49	17.26	28.68
	Fourth party	Fifth party
Party	Labour Co-op	TUSC
Seats before	2	1
Seats won	2	0
Seats after	3	1
Seat change	▲1	Steady
Popular vote	3,874	562
Percentage	4.06	0.59
- Results of the 2015 Warrington Borough Council election
Council control before election
Labour
Council control after election
Labour

The 2015 Warrington Borough Council election took place on 7 May 2015 to elect members of Warrington Borough Council in England. This was on the same day as other local elections.

== Council Composition ==
Prior to the election the composition of the council was:

↓
40	2	11	3	1
Labour	Labour Co-op	Lib Dem	Con	T

After the election the composition of the council was:

↓
39	3	9	5	1
Labour	Labour Co-op	Lib Dem	Con	T

== Results ==
2015 Warrington Borough Council election
Party	This election			Full council			This election		
Party	Seats	Net	Seats %	Other	Total	Total %	Votes	Votes %	+/−
Labour	12	▼1	63.16	27	39	68.42	36,697	38.49	0
Liberal Democrats	2	▼2	10.53	7	9	15.79	16,456	17.26	0
Conservative	3	▲2	15.79	2	5	8.77	27,349	28.68	0
Labour Co-op	2	▲1	10.53	1	3	5.26	3,874	4.06	0
TUSC	0	Steady	0.00	1	1	1.75	562	0.59	0
UKIP	0	Steady	0.00	0	0	0.00	9,021	9.46	0
Green	0	Steady	0.00	0	0	0.00	1,389	1.46	0

== Ward Results ==
=== Appleton ===
Appleton
Party	Candidate	Votes	%
Liberal Democrats	Peter John Walker*	3,605	55.40
Conservative	Jonathan Levy	2,902	44.60
Turnout			77.25
Liberal Democrats hold			

=== Bewsey and Whitecross ===
Bewsey and Whitecross
Party	Candidate	Votes	%
Labour	Stephen Parish*	2,837	60.89
Conservative	Sonia Boggan	702	15.07
UKIP	Michael Byrne	692	14.85
Liberal Democrats	Robert Timmis	347	7.45
TUSC	Daniel Warren	81	1.74
Turnout		4,659	50.28
Labour hold			

=== Birchwood ===
Birchwood
Party	Candidate	Votes	%
Labour	Chris Fitzsimmons*	2,404	45.06
Conservative	Nigel Balding	1,549	29.03
UKIP	Michael Robert Amos Johnson	827	15.50
Green	Tracey Valentine	288	5.40
Liberal Democrats	Christine Diane Oliver	267	5.00
Turnout			64.35
Labour hold			

=== Burtonwood and Winwick ===
Burtonwood and Winwick
Party	Candidate	Votes	%
Labour	John Joyce*	1,926	58.67
Conservative	Frank Richard Allen	1,062	32.35
Liberal Democrats	Robert Stephen Littler	295	8.99
Turnout			65.47
Labour hold			

=== Culcheth, Glazebury and Croft ===
Culcheth, Glazebury and Croft
Party	Candidate	Votes	%
Conservative	Sue Bland*	3,024	48.54
Labour	Cathy Mitchell	2,674	42.92
Liberal Democrats	Eddie Stone	532	8.54
Turnout			73.20
Conservative hold			

=== Fairfield and Howley ===
Fairfield and Howley
Party	Candidate	Votes	%
Labour	Anthony Higgins*	2,864	56.14
UKIP	Phillip Henshaw	937	18.37
Conservative	Helena Campbell	826	16.19
Green	Lyndsay McAteer	407	7.98
Liberal Democrats	Margaret Oldbury	68	1.33
Turnout			51.23
Labour hold			

=== Grappenhall and Thellwall ===
Grappenhall and Thelwall
Party	Candidate	Votes	%
Liberal Democrats	Michael Biggin*	2,583	43.24
Conservative	Constantine Biller	1,879	31.45
Labour	Thomas Jennings	1,216	20.36
Green	Andrew Yelland	296	4.96
Turnout			76.26
Liberal Democrats hold			

=== Great Sankey North ===
Great Sankey North
Party	Candidate	Votes	%
Labour Co-op	Dan Price*	1,510	41.44
Conservative	Mike Foxall	1,027	28.18
Liberal Democrats	Roy Smith	524	14.38
UKIP	Mal Lingley	423	11.61
Green	Stephanie Davies	160	4.39
Turnout			72.36
Labour Co-op gain from Labour			

=== Great Sankey South ===
Great Sankey South
Party	Candidate	Votes	%
Labour	Jean Carter*	3,017	54.26
Conservative	Maxine Thomson	1,945	34.98
Liberal Democrats	David Hockenhull	348	6.26
TUSC	Andrew Ford	250	4.50
Turnout			68.38
Labour hold			

=== Latchford East ===
Latchford East
Party	Candidate	Votes	%
Labour Co-op	Hans Josef Mundry*	2,364	63.53
Conservative	Harish Sharma	561	15.08
UKIP	Sidney Simmons	558	15.00
Liberal Democrats	Timothy Price	238	6.40
Turnout			56.25
Labour Co-op hold			

=== Latchford West ===
Latchford West
Party	Candidate	Votes	%
Labour	Maureen McLaughlin*	1,808	47.34
Conservative	Philip Marshall	1,004	26.29
UKIP	Gerrard Hall	605	15.84
Liberal Democrats	Ruper George Stephen Budgen	327	8.56
TUSC	Shelley Jean Bennett	75	1.96
Turnout			64.00
Labour hold			

=== Lymm ===
Lymm
Party	Candidate	Votes	%
Conservative	Kathryn Buckley	2,995	39.81
Liberal Democrats	Ian George Marks*	2,483	33.00
Labour	Christine Zastawny	1,418	18.85
UKIP	Frederick Clark	628	8.34
Turnout			75.66
Conservative gain from Liberal Democrats			

=== Orford ===
Orford
Party	Candidate	Votes	%
Labour	Kate Hannon*	2,864	66.20
UKIP	Ian Richards	1,138	26.31
Liberal Democrats	Edgar John Davies	324	7.49
Turnout			55.13
Labour hold			

=== Penketh and Cuerdley ===
Penketh and Cuerdley
Party	Candidate	Votes	%
Labour	Linda Susan Dirir*	2,683	52.55
Conservative	Samuel Baxter	2,167	42.44
Liberal Democrats	Graham Farrington Gowland	256	5.01
Turnout			74.00
Labour hold			

=== Poplars and Hulme ===
Poplars and Hulme
Party	Candidate	Votes	%
Labour	Stephen Roberts*	2,471	59.19
UKIP	Trevor Nicholls	923	22.11
Conservative	Francine Elizabeth Leslie	659	15.78
Liberal Democrats	Shanise Oldbury	122	2.92
Turnout			53.79
Labour hold			

=== Poulton North ===
Poulton North
Party	Candidate	Votes	%
Labour	Graham Friend*	2,624	54.28
UKIP	Barbara Ruth Johnson	1,376	28.47
Liberal Democrats	Sandra Joan Bradshaw	834	17.25
Turnout			62.00
Labour hold			

=== Rixton and Woolston ===
Rixton and Woolston
Party	Candidate	Votes	%
Labour	Paul Bretherton*	2,395	47.45
Conservative	Robin Sloan	1,498	29.68
UKIP	Geoff Siddall	914	18.11
Liberal Democrats	Diana Grylls	241	4.77
Turnout			68.26
Labour hold			

=== Stockton Heath ===
Stockton Heath
Party	Candidate	Votes	%
Conservative	Stephen Taylor	1,526	40.42
Liberal Democrats	Christine Raymond	1,157	30.65
Labour	Karen Mundry	854	22.62
Green	Kenneth Robin Wilson	238	6.31
Turnout			76.05
Conservative gain from Liberal Democrats			

=== Whittle Hall ===
Whittle Hall
Party	Candidate	Votes	%
Labour	Faisal Rashid*	2,961	42.02
Conservative	Julian Craddock	2,023	28.71
Liberal Democrats	Allan Keith Bird	1,905	27.03
TUSC	Adam Hemsley	158	2.24
Turnout			69.03
Labour hold			
