= 2010 Warrington Borough Council election =

2010 English local government election

Map of the 2010 Warrington Borough Council election

The 2010 Warrington Borough Council election took place on 6 May 2010 to elect a third of the members of Warrington Borough Council, the council of Warrington in England. This was on the same day as the other local elections across England as well as the 2010 United Kingdom general election. The previous council election took place in 2008 and the following election was held in 2011. In the election, the council stayed under no overall control with Labour as the largest party.

== Results ==
Party	Previous	Seats +/-	2010
Labour	22	▲5	27
Liberal Democrat	28	▼4	24
Conservative	7	▼1	6

== See also ==
- Warrington Borough Council elections
