= Sarah Hall (British politician) =

British politician

Sarah Hall MP
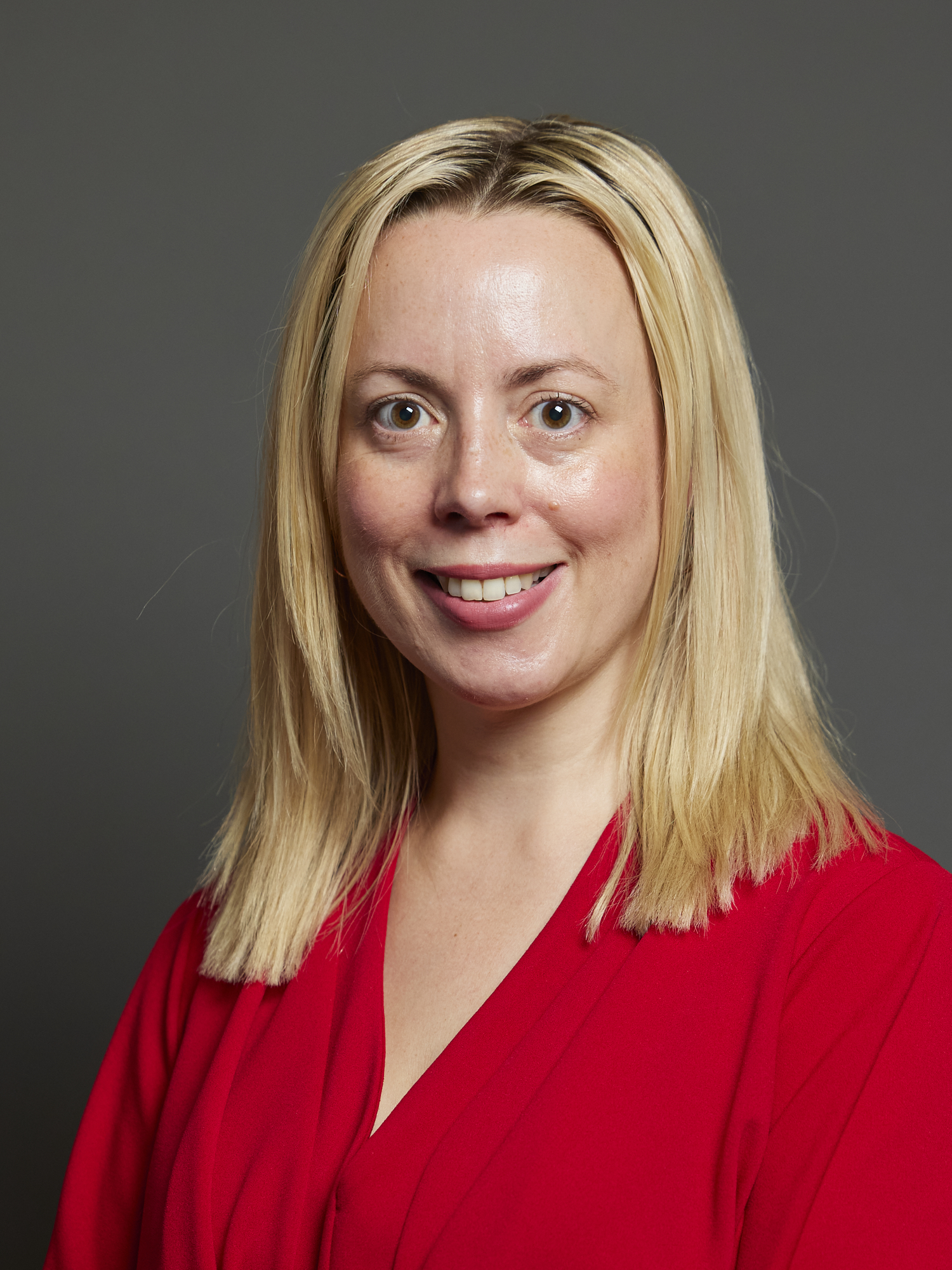
- Official portrait, 2024

Member of Parliament for Warrington South
- Incumbent
- Assumed office 4 July 2024
- Preceded by: Andy Carter
- Majority: 11,340 (22.8%)

Member of Warrington Borough Council
- In office 6 May 2016 – 7 May 2024
- Ward: Bewsey & Whitecross
- Preceded by: Ward established
- Succeeded by: Shireen Saeed Mohammed

Personal details
- Party: Labour and Co-operative
- Spouse: Thomas Hall
- Relations: Mike Hall (father-in-law)

Sarah Edith Hall is a British politician who has been the Member of Parliament for Warrington South as a member of the Labour & Co-operative Party since 2024.

== Political career ==
Hall was elected as a Councillor on Warrington Borough Council in the 2016 Warrington Borough Council election representing the ward Bewsey & Whitecross. In 2021, she was appointed as Cabinet Member for Children's Services. She stepped down before the 2024 local election.

In May 2026, Hall called for Keir Starmer to resign following the 2026 United Kingdom local elections.

== Personal life ==
She is married to Thomas Hall. Her father-in-law, Mike Hall, served as Labour MP for Warrington South from 1992 to 1997.

She was diagnosed with attention deficit hyperactivity disorder (ADHD) in 2021.
