= 2011 Warrington Borough Council election =

2011 UK local government election

Results of the 2011 Warrington Borough Council election

Elections to Warrington Borough Council were held on 5 May 2011. Twenty seats out of the total of fifty-seven were up for election. The Labour Party gained control of the council which had been run by a Liberal-Democrat/Conservative coalition.

== Result ==
Warrington Borough Council election, 2011
Party	Seats	Gains	Losses	Net gain/loss	Seats %	Votes %	Votes	+/−
Labour	34	+6	0	+6	60.0			
Conservative	6	0	0	0	10.0			
Liberal Democrats	17	-6	0	-6	30.0			
BNP	0	0	0	0	0.0			
Green	0	0	0	0	0.0			
UKIP	0	0	0	0	0.0			

== Ward results ==
Appleton
Party	Candidate	Votes	%	±%
Labour	Paul Carter			
Conservative	Phil Marshall			
Liberal Democrats	Peter Walker			
Majority				
Turnout				

Bewsey and Whitecross
Party	Candidate	Votes	%	±%
Conservative	Jonathan Levy			
Labour	Steve Parish			
BNP	Mike Philips			
Liberal Democrats	Bob Timmis			
Majority				
Turnout				

Birchwood
Party	Candidate	Votes	%	±%
Labour	Chris Fitzsimmons			
Liberal Democrats	Christine Oliver			
Conservative	Judith Wise			
Majority				
Turnout				

Burtonwood and Winwick
Party	Candidate	Votes	%	±%
Conservative	Frank Allen			
Labour	John Joyce			
Majority				
Turnout				

Culcheth, Glazebury and Croft
Party	Candidate	Votes	%	±%
Conservative	Sue Bland			
Liberal Democrats	Merril Cummerson			
Labour	Chris Vobe			
Majority				
Turnout				

Fairfield & Howley
Party	Candidate	Votes	%	±%
Liberal Democrats	Sandra Bradshaw			
Labour	Tony Higgins			
Conservative	Ileyne Hutchinson			
Green	Lyndsay McAteer			
Majority				
Turnout				

Grappenhall & Thelwall
Party	Candidate	Votes	%	±%
Liberal Democrats	Mike Biggin			
Conservative	Roger Philip Cawthorne			
Labour	Helen Jayne Dutton			
UKIP	Richard William Vaughan			
Majority				
Turnout				

Great Sankey North
Party	Candidate	Votes	%	±%
Green	Stephanie Davies			
Conservative	David Scott McNeilage			
Labour	Dan Price			
Liberal Democrats	Roy Alfred Smith			
Majority				
Turnout				

Great Sankey South
Party	Candidate	Votes	%	±%
Conservative	Sam Baxter			
Labour	Jean Carter			
Liberal Democrats	Jim Regan			
Majority				
Turnout				

Latchford East
Party	Candidate	Votes	%	±%
Labour	Hans Mundry			
Liberal Democrats	Tim Price			
Conservative	Lance Reah			
Majority				
Turnout				

Latchford West
Party	Candidate	Votes	%	±%
Liberal Democrats	Ted Finnegan			
Conservative	Matthew Kirwan Edward Harris			
Labour	Maureen Penelope McLaughlin			
Green	Mike Smith			
Majority				
Turnout				

Lymm
Party	Candidate	Votes	%	±%
UKIP	James Ashington			
Liberal Democrats	Ian George Marks			
Conservative	Harish Chander Sharma			
Labour	Su Williams			
Majority				
Turnout				

Orford
Party	Candidate	Votes	%	±%
Liberal Democrats	Edgar John Davies			
Labour	Kate Hannon			
Conservative	Brian Lambert			
Majority				
Turnout				

Penketh & Cuerdley
Party	Candidate	Votes	%	±%
Labour	Linda Susan Dirir			
Conservative	Peter Bennett Elton			
Majority				
Turnout				

Stockton Heath
Party	Candidate	Votes	%	±%
Liberal Democrats	Celia Elizabeth Jordan			
Labour	Laurence James Murphy			
Conservative	Stephen Taylor			
Green	Kenneth Robin Wilson			
Majority				
Turnout				

Westbrook
Party	Candidate	Votes	%	±%
UKIP	Derek Clark			
Labour	Jan Davidson			
Liberal Democrats	Stefan Krizanac			
Conservative	Robert James Maclaren			
Majority				
Turnout				

Whittle Hall
Party	Candidate	Votes	%	±%
Conservative	Stephen James Bradley			
Labour	Faisal Rashid			
Liberal Democrats	Judith Carol Wheeler			
Majority				
Turnout				
