= 2014 Warrington Borough Council election =

2014 UK local government election

← 2012	22 May 2014	2015 →
	First party	Second party	Third party
Party	Labour	Liberal Democrats	Conservative
Seats before	39	12	4
Seats after	40	11	3
Seat change	▲1	▼1	▼1
Popular vote	19,621	9,349	10,149
Percentage	40.22	19.16	20.80
	Fourth party
Party	Labour Co-op
Seats before	3
Seats after	3
Seat change	Steady
Popular vote	1,179
Percentage	2.42
- Results of the 2014 Warrington Borough Council election
Council control before election
Labour
Council control after election
Labour

The 2014 Warrington Borough Council election took place on 22 May 2014 to elect 19 of the 57 members of the Warrington Borough Council in England. They formed part of the United Kingdom's local elections of 2014.

== Council Composition ==
Prior to the election the composition of the council was:

↓
38	3	12	4
Labour	Labour Co-op	Lib Dem	Con

After the election the composition of the council was:

↓
40	3	11	3
Labour	Labour Co-op	Lib Dem	Con

== Results ==
2014 Warrington Borough Council election
Party	This election			Full council			This election		
Party	Seats	Net	Seats %	Other	Total	Total %	Votes	Votes %	+/−
Labour	13	▲2	68.42	27	40	70.18	19,621	40.22	0
Liberal Democrats	5	▼1	26.32	6	11	19.30	9,349	19.16	0
Conservative	0	▼1	0.00	3	3	5.26	10,149	20.80	0
Labour Co-op	1	Steady	1.75	2	3	5.26	1,179	2.42	0
UKIP	0	Steady	0.00	0	0	0.00	7,787	15.96	0
Green	0	Steady	0.00	0	0	0.00	701	1.44	0

== Ward Results ==
=== Appleton ===
Appleton
Party	Candidate	Votes	%
Liberal Democrats	Judith Carol Wheeler	1,851	54.00
Conservative	Jonathan Levy	1,053	30.72
Labour	Andy Davidson	328	9.57
Green	Pete Kennedy	196	5.72
Turnout			40.79
Liberal Democrats hold			

=== Bewsey and Whitecross ===
Bewsey and Whitecross
Party	Candidate	Votes	%
Labour	Pat Wright	1,492	68.50
Liberal Democrats	Bob Timmis	365	16.76
Conservative	Mike Foxall	321	14.73
Turnout			22.64
Labour hold			

=== Birchwood ===
Birchwood
Party	Candidate	Votes	%
Labour	Russ Bowden*	1,604	60.39
Conservative	Nigel Balding	846	31.85
Liberal Democrats	Chris Oliver	206	7.76
Turnout			31.61
Labour hold			

=== Culcheth, Glazebury and Croft ===
Culcheth, Glazebury and Croft
Party	Candidate	Votes	%
Labour	Matt Smith	1,719	46.27
Conservative	Paul Campbell	1,246	33.54
UKIP	Beverley Fairfoull	528	14.21
Liberal Democrats	Merril Cummerson	222	5.98
Turnout			42.63
Labour gain from Conservative			

=== Fairfield and Howley ===
Fairfield and Howley
Party	Candidate	Votes	%
Labour	Peter Carey*	1,191	49.56
UKIP	Phillip Henshaw	697	29.01
Conservative	Helena Campbell	267	11.1
Green	Lyndsay McAteer	181	7.53
Liberal Democrats	Margaret Ann Oldbury	67	2.79
Turnout			23.11
Labour hold			

=== Grappenhall and Thellwall ===
Grappenhall and Thelwall
Party	Candidate	Votes	%
Liberal Democrats	Wendy Johnson*	1,458	45.00
Labour	Thomas Jenninngs	662	20.43
Conservative	Stephen Taylor	569	17.56
UKIP	Andrew Fairfoull	432	13.33
Green	Kenneth Robin Wilson	119	3.67
Turnout			41.68
Liberal Democrats hold			

=== Great Sankey North ===
Great Sankey North
Party	Candidate	Votes	%
Labour	Andy Heaver	690	39.47
UKIP	Mal Lingley	339	19.39
Conservative	David McNeilage	319	18.25
Liberal Democrats	Roy Alfred Smith	298	17.05
Green	Stephanie Davies	102	5.84
Turnout			34.36
Labour gain from Liberal Democrats			

=== Great Sankey South ===
Great Sankey South
Party	Candidate	Votes	%
Labour	Hitesh Patel	1,451	59.78
Conservative	Roger Philip Cawthorne	658	27.11
Liberal Democrats	Kevin Murtagh Reynolds	318	13.10
Turnout			30.15
Labour hold			

=== Latchford East ===
Latchford East
Party	Candidate	Votes	%
Labour Co-op	Steve Wright	1,179	66.42
UKIP	Sid Simmons	376	21.18
Conservative	Harish Sharma	140	7.89
Liberal Democrats	Timothy Nicholas Geoffrey Price	80	4.51
Turnout			27.00
Labour Co-op hold			

=== Latchford West ===
Latchford West
Party	Candidate	Votes	%
Labour	Les Morgan	841	43.96
UKIP	Ged Hall	512	26.76
Conservative	Phil Marshall	266	13.88
Liberal Democrats	Ann Raymond	191	9.98
Green	Michael Victor Smith	103	5.38
Turnout			32.47
Labour gain from Liberal Democrats			

=== Lymm ===
Lymm
Party	Candidate	Votes	%
Liberal Democrats	Bob Barr*	1,423	35.49
Conservative	Kath Buckley	1,305	32.54
Labour	Sean Chapman	685	17.08
UKIP	James Ashington	597	14.89
Turnout			40.65
Liberal Democrats hold			

=== Orford ===
Orford
Party	Candidate	Votes	%
Labour	Kerri Louise Morris	1,097	52.89
UKIP	Ian Richards	749	36.11
Conservative	Simone Johnson	179	8.63
Liberal Democrats	Edgar John Davies	49	2.36
Turnout			25.54
Labour hold			

=== Penketh and Cuerdley ===
Penketh and Cuerdley
Party	Candidate	Votes	%
Labour	David Keane*	1,129	43.04
Conservative	Sam Baxter	937	35.72
UKIP	Bev Stein	557	21.24
Turnout			37.91
Labour hold			

=== Poplars and Hulme ===
Poplars and Hulme
Party	Candidate	Votes	%
Labour	John Kerr-Brown	1,043	50.93
UKIP	Trevor Nicholls	671	32.76
Conservative	Frank Allen	196	9.57
Liberal Democrats	Iona Katrine Gillis	138	6.74
Turnout			25.90
Labour hold			

=== Poulton North ===
Poulton North
Party	Candidate	Votes	%
Labour	George Settle*	1,154	46.36
UKIP	David Bennett	767	30.82
Conservative	Mark William Chapman	341	13.70
Liberal Democrats	Jeff Butler	227	9.12
Turnout			30.17
Labour hold			

=== Poulton South ===
Poulton South
Party	Candidate	Votes	%
Labour	Maureen Creaghan	824	44.42
UKIP	Michael Johnson	576	31.05
Conservative	Howard Klein	379	20.43
Liberal Democrats	Sandra Joan Bradshaw	76	4.10
Turnout			35.05
Labour hold			

=== Rixton and Woolston ===
Rixton and Woolston
Party	Candidate	Votes	%
Labour	Bill Brinksman*	1,126	48.45
UKIP	Geoff Siddall	683	29.39
Conservative	Ben Eccleston	431	18.55
Liberal Democrats	Diana Grylls	84	3.61
Turnout			31.21
Labour hold			

=== Westbrook ===
Westbrook
Party	Candidate	Votes	%
Liberal Democrats	Stefan Krizanac	595	37.12
Labour	Linda Ollerton	475	29.63
UKIP	Derek Clark	303	18.90
Conservative	Matt Jones	230	14.35
Turnout			31.18
Liberal Democrats gain from Labour			

=== Whittle Hall ===
Whittle Hall
Party	Candidate	Votes	%
Liberal Democrats	Keith David Gleave*	1,701	52.68
Labour	Karen Mundry	931	28.83
Conservative	Julian Craddock	466	14.43
TUSC	Adam Hemsley	131	4.06
Turnout			31.63
Liberal Democrats hold			
