= Orford Park =

Park in Warrington, Cheshire, England

Coordinates: 53.404°N 2.582°W

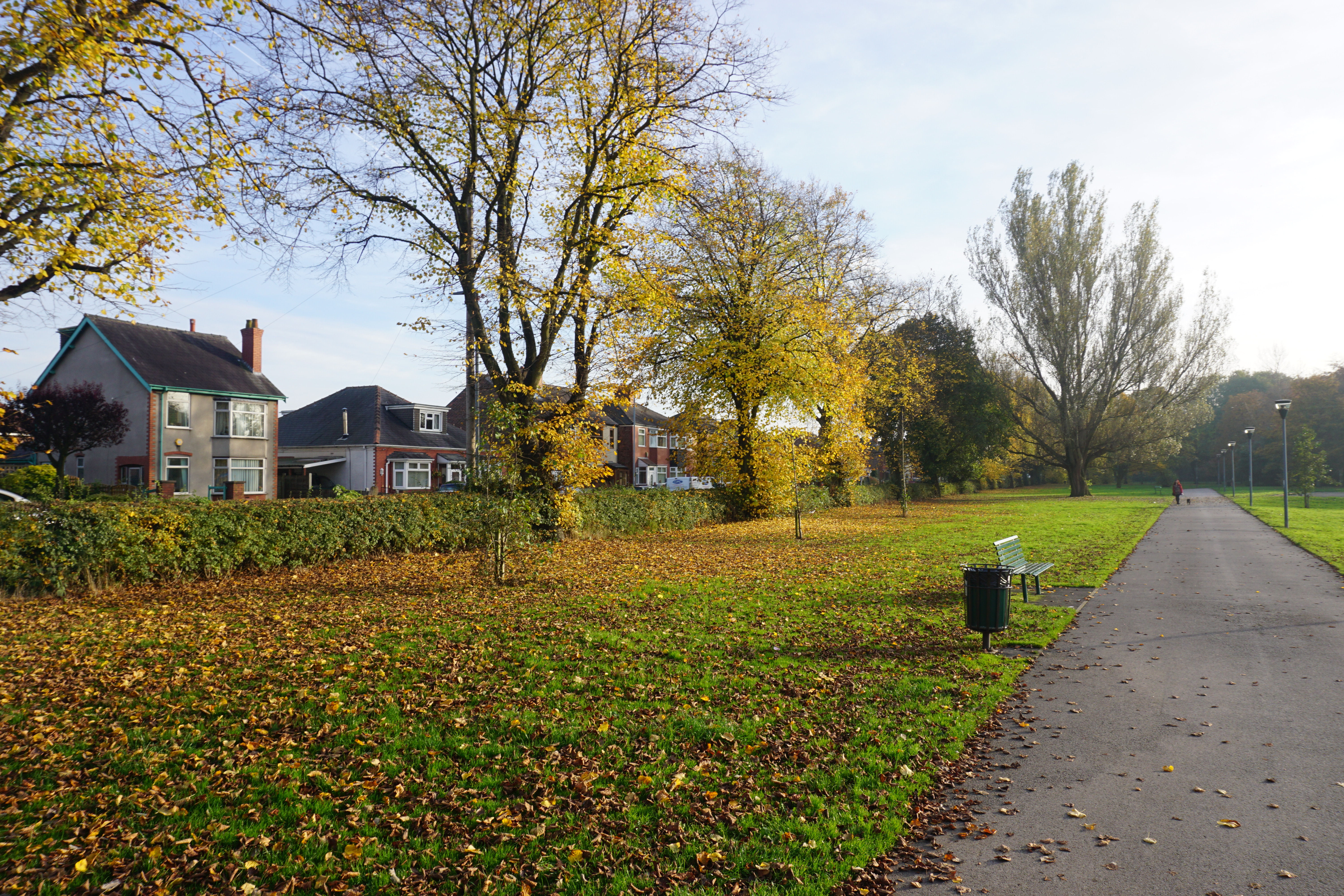
Orford Park

Orford Park is a municipal park in the town of Warrington, Cheshire, England.

Orford Hall and surrounding lands were donated to Warrington Council in December 1916. The hall was demolished in 1935 but its grounds remain as Orford Park, a green lung in an area near the town centre. There are plans for major sport and community development in the park, which is currently the site of two tennis courts and a bowling green.

In 2009, a £30m redevelopment project for the park was approved by Warrington Borough Council. Work began in May of that year and concluded three years later in May 2012. The project saw the Orford Jubilee Neighbourhood Hub built on the western end of Orford Park, which was opened by Elizabeth II as part of her Diamond Jubilee celebrations. A Decathlon sports store was built on the land directly adjacent to Winwick Road. New paved paths were installed to create a route for pedestrians and cycles between Winwick Road, Hallfields Road and School Road. A pond was added at the northern edge of the park. The original main area in the southeast of the park was updated; it now boasts a skate park, children's playground, bowling green, ball court and football pitches.

The park is home to a number of British birds, mammals, amphibians, fish and invertebrates, along with occasional visiting reptiles. Some common species include mallards, black-headed gulls, water voles, common frogs and common gulls.

William Beamont, a local historian and the first Mayor of Warrington lived in Orford Hall for some 23 years, until his death in 1889.
