= List of schools in Cheshire =

There is no county-wide local education authority in Cheshire, instead education services are provided by the four smaller unitary authorities of Cheshire East, Cheshire West and Chester, Halton and Warrington:

- List of schools in Cheshire East
- List of schools in Cheshire West and Chester
- List of schools in Halton
- List of schools in Warrington
