= 2008 Warrington Borough Council election =

2008 English local government election

Map of the 2008 Warrington Borough Council election

The 2008 Warrington Borough Council election took place on 1 May 2008 to elect a third of the members of Warrington Borough Council, the council of Warrington in England. This was on the same day as the other 2008 United Kingdom local elections and had a number of errors in the process for which the council's chief executive apologised. The previous council election took place in 2007 and the following election was held in 2010. In the election, the council stayed under no overall control with the Liberal Democrats as the largest party.

== Results ==
Party	Previous	Seats +/-	2008
Liberal Democrat	27	▲1	28
Labour	24	▼2	22
Conservative	5	▲2	7
Others	1	▼1	0

== See also ==
- Warrington Borough Council elections
