= Longford, Warrington =

Neighbourhood in England

Coordinates: 53°24′36″N 2°35′22″W

Longford
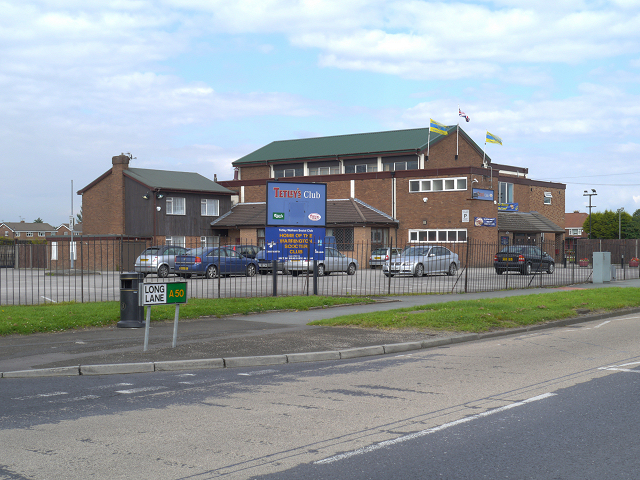
- Tetley's Club, Long Lane

- Location within Cheshire
- OS grid reference: SJ608905
- Unitary authority: Warrington
- Ceremonial county: Cheshire
- Region: North West
- Country: England
- Sovereign state: United Kingdom
- Post town: Warrington
- Postcode district: WA2
- Dialling code: 01925
- Police: Cheshire
- Fire: Cheshire
- Ambulance: North West
- UK Parliament: Warrington North

Longford is a neighbourhood that sits just to the north of Howley and Fairfield and the area to the east of the A49, Winwick road. It is served by bus services 20 and 21 which have a combined frequency of every 5 minutes and operate as a circular route between Warrington Town Centre, Longford and Orford. In 2011 the Longford roundabout was removed and a new traffic light controlled crossroads junction took its place.

== Politics ==
There are three councillors. All councillors for this area are representatives of the Labour Party.

=== Population ===
- Total Population: 8,012 residents
- Male:female ratio: 55.5:44.5
- Mean age of population: 31 years

==== Ethnicity breakdown ====
- 96% White
- 2% Mixed
- 1% Asian
- 1% Black

=== Housing and social situation ===
==== Housing ====
  - Owned 32%
  - Mortgage 39.6%
  - Shared 0.7%
  - Social Rented (Council) 7.2%
  - Social Rented (Housing Assoc) 8.4%
  - Private Rented 10.2%
  - Other 1%
  - Rent Free 0.8%

=== Parks and recreation ===
The local park is named Poole Park, and is off Winwick road.

=== Employment and education ===
==== Employment ====
- 70.1% are employed.
- 4.4% are unemployed.
- 2.2% are students.
- 23.3% are classed as "economically inactive".

==== Education ====
- 25.5% have no qualifications.
- 38.6% have only level 1 or 2 qualifications.
- 18.3% have level 3 or higher.
