= 2024 Warrington parish and town council elections =

Parish and town council elections in the Borough of Warrington, England

Elections to parish and town councils within the Borough of Warrington were held on 2 May 2024, on the same day as the 2024 Warrington Borough Council election. Many of the individual parish wards were uncontested.

(UC) denotes an uncontested result.

== Appleton Parish Council - Cobbs & Hillcliffe ==
Appleton Parish Council - Cobbs & Hillcliffe (8 seats)
Party	Candidate	Votes	%	±%
Liberal Democrats	Laura Booth	UC	N/A	N/A
Conservative	Ghazala Chapman	UC	N/A	N/A
Conservative	Laurence Kevin Chapman	UC	N/A	N/A
Conservative	Kenneth Critchley	UC	N/A	N/A
Liberal Democrats	Vicki Duncan	UC	N/A	N/A
Liberal Democrats	Peter Russell Lewenz	UC	N/A	N/A
Liberal Democrats	Lynn Nicholls	UC	N/A	N/A
Liberal Democrats	Judith Wheeler	UC	N/A	N/A

== Appleton Parish Council - Hillcliffe North ==
Appleton Parish Council - Hillcliffe North (1 seat)
Party	Candidate	Votes	%	±%
Liberal Democrats	Peter John Walker	UC	N/A	N/A

== Appleton Parish Council - Thorn ==
Appleton Parish Council - Thorn (2 seat)
Party	Candidate	Votes	%	±%
Liberal Democrats	Mark Damen Brown	UC	N/A	N/A
Liberal Democrats	Helen Speed	UC	N/A	N/A

== Birchwood Town Council - Chatfield ==
Birchwood Town Council - Chatfield (2 seats)
Party	Candidate	Votes	%	±%
Labour	Barry John Allman	UC	N/A	N/A
Labour	Julie Brereton	UC	N/A	N/A

== Birchwood Town Council - Gorse Covert ==
Birchwood Town Council - Gorse Covert (3 seats)
Party	Candidate	Votes	%	±%
Labour	Nigel James Reeves	375	N/A	N/A
Independent	Ian Atkin	324	N/A	N/A
Labour	Michael Evans	280*	N/A	N/A
Conservative	Nigel William Balding	280*	N/A	N/A
Labour	Cheyvonne Caroline Bower	259	N/A	N/A

Note: Two candidates were tied with 280 votes. The winner was drawn via lot.

== Birchwood Town Council - Locking Stumps ==
Birchwood Town Council - Locking Stumps (4 seats)
Party	Candidate	Votes	%	±%
Labour	David Alexander Ball	UC	N/A	N/A
Labour	Balbir Kaur Dhillon	UC	N/A	N/A
Labour	Kuldeep Singh Dhillon	UC	N/A	N/A
Labour	David Michael Ellis	UC	N/A	N/A

== Birchwood Town Council - Oakwood ==
Birchwood Town Council - Oakwood (3 seats)
Party	Candidate	Votes	%	±%
Labour	Sheridan Jacquie	UC	N/A	N/A
Labour	Tim Price	UC	N/A	N/A
Labour	George Simcock	UC	N/A	N/A

== Burtonwood & Westbrook Parish Council - Burtonwood ==
Burtonwood & Westbrook Parish Council - Burtonwood (5 seats)
Party	Candidate	Votes	%	±%
Labour	Kevin Burgess	UC	N/A	N/A
Independent	Kevin Richard Cox	UC	N/A	N/A
Labour	Ceri Thomas Mitchell	UC	N/A	N/A
Independent	Theresa Murray	UC	N/A	N/A
Independent	Jan White	UC	N/A	N/A

== Burtonwood & Westbrook Parish Council - Old Hall ==
Burtonwood & Westbrook Parish Council - Old Hall (1 seat)
Party	Candidate	Votes	%	±%
Independent	Jason Ian Webb	UC	N/A	N/A

== Burtonwood & Westbrook Parish Council - Westbrook ==
Burtonwood & Westbrook Parish Council - Westbrook (7 seats)
Party	Candidate	Votes	%	±%
Independent	Nigel John Catlow	UC	N/A	N/A
Labour	Kate Eglinton	UC	N/A	N/A
Labour	Brian Gallagher	UC	N/A	N/A
Labour	Barrie Paul Morgan-Scrutton	UC	N/A	N/A
Labour	Brian Charles Morgan-Scrutton	UC	N/A	N/A
Independent	Dan Peers	UC	N/A	N/A
Labour	Marc Victor Rufus	UC	N/A	N/A

== Croft Parish Council - Southworth ==
Croft Parish Council - Southworth (6 seats)
Party	Candidate	Votes	%	±%
Conservative	Valerie Margaret Allen	UC	N/A	N/A
Conservative	Carol Ruth Benson	UC	N/A	N/A
Labour	Cheyvonne Caroline Bower	UC	N/A	N/A
Labour	Norman Partington	UC	N/A	N/A
Conservative	Phillip Sharpe	UC	N/A	N/A
Conservative	Sue Ward	UC	N/A	N/A

== Culcheth & Glazebury Parish Council - Culcheth ==
Culcheth & Glazebury Parish Council - Culcheth (5 seats)
Party	Candidate	Votes	%	±%
Conservative	Valerie Margaret Allen	UC	N/A	N/A
Conservative	Carol Ruth Benson	UC	N/A	N/A
Conservative	Paul Campbell	UC	N/A	N/A
Labour	Christine Anne Smith	UC	N/A	N/A
Conservative	Les Turner	UC	N/A	N/A

== Culcheth & Glazebury Parish Council - Glazebury & Mee Brow ==
Culcheth & Glazebury Parish Council - Glazebury & Mee Brow (2 seats)
Party	Candidate	Votes	%	±%
Labour	Janet Elizabeth Seddon	266	N/A	N/A
Conservative	Alicia Edwards	233	N/A	N/A
Labour	Stephen Voyse	231	N/A	N/A
Independent	Peter Charles Grundy	165	N/A	N/A

== Culcheth & Glazebury Parish Council - Newchurch ==
Culcheth & Glazebury Parish Council - Newchurch (3 seats)
Party	Candidate	Votes	%	±%
Labour	Ben Alldred	UC	N/A	N/A
Conservative	Steve Fleming	UC	N/A	N/A
Labour	Neil Johnson	UC	N/A	N/A

== Grappenhall & Thelwall Parish Council - Grappenhall ==
Grappenhall & Thelwall Parish Council - Grappenhall (7 seats)
Party	Candidate	Votes	%	±%
Liberal Democrats	Charlie Ford	UC	N/A	N/A
Liberal Democrats	Rod Furnell	UC	N/A	N/A
Liberal Democrats	David Hockenhull	UC	N/A	N/A
Liberal Democrats	John McQuillian	UC	N/A	N/A
Liberal Democrats	Patrick Warner	UC	N/A	N/A
Liberal Democrats	Leila Michele Williams	UC	N/A	N/A
Liberal Democrats	Christopher William Worsley	UC	N/A	N/A

== Grappenhall & Thelwall Parish Council - Thelwall ==
Grappenhall & Thelwall Parish Council - Thelwall (7 seats)
Party	Candidate	Votes	%	±%
Liberal Democrats	Mark Damen Brown	UC	N/A	N/A
Liberal Democrats	Brian Michael Davis	UC	N/A	N/A
Liberal Democrats	Louise Fernyhough	UC	N/A	N/A
Liberal Democrats	Ray Fisher	UC	N/A	N/A
Liberal Democrats	Bob Hignett	UC	N/A	N/A
Liberal Democrats	Wendy Johnson	UC	N/A	N/A
Liberal Democrats	Helen Speed	UC	N/A	N/A

== Great Sankey Parish Council - Central ==
Great Sankey Parish Council - Central (5 seats)
Party	Candidate	Votes	%	±%
Labour	Steve Parish	1,311	N/A	N/A
Labour	Brian Simpson	1,271	N/A	N/A
Labour	Stephen Winwood Pennington	1,209	N/A	N/A
Labour	Christopher David Lynas	1,069	N/A	N/A
Labour	Abdul Muqeem	1,027	N/A	N/A
Conservative	Blake Cooper	640	N/A	N/A
Conservative	Nisha Jethalal Shah	508	N/A	N/A

== Great Sankey Parish Council - Liverpool Road ==
Great Sankey Parish Council - Liverpool Road (1 seat)
Party	Candidate	Votes	%	±%
Labour	Tony Williams	UC	N/A	N/A

== Great Sankey Parish Council - North ==
Great Sankey Parish Council - North (4 seats)
Party	Candidate	Votes	%	±%
Independent	Nigel John Catlow	1,602	N/A	N/A
Labour	Hilary Cooksey	1,460	N/A	N/A
Labour	Andrea Marie Morley	1,386	N/A	N/A
Labour	Marcus Cameron	1,043	N/A	N/A
Labour	David James Challenger	910	N/A	N/A

== Great Sankey Parish Council - South ==
Great Sankey Parish Council - South (4 seats)
Party	Candidate	Votes	%	±%
Labour	Nikki Cotter	1,466	N/A	N/A
Labour	Leah Hussain	1,194	N/A	N/A
Labour	Mo Hussain	1,173	N/A	N/A
Labour	Christopher Wren	1,038	N/A	N/A
Liberal Democrats	Anthony James Tobin	693	N/A	N/A

== Great Sankey Parish Council - South West ==
Great Sankey Parish Council - South West (1 seat)
Party	Candidate	Votes	%	±%
Labour	Peter Watson	UC	N/A	N/A

== Hatton Parish Council ==
Hatton Parish Council (7 seats)
Party	Candidate	Votes	%	±%
Independent	Andrew Gerald Blanshard	UC	N/A	N/A
Independent	Andrew Mark Bradbury	UC	N/A	N/A
Conservative	Ghazala Chapman	UC	N/A	N/A
Independent	Jayne Power	UC	N/A	N/A
Independent	Stuart Paul Tranter	UC	N/A	N/A
Independent	Julian Hayes Wrigley	UC	N/A	N/A
Independent	Phillip William Young	UC	N/A	N/A

== Lymm Parish Council - Lymm North ==
Lymm Parish Council - Lymm North (6 seats)
Party	Candidate	Votes	%	±%
Liberal Democrats	Chris East	UC	N/A	N/A
Liberal Democrats	Jane Rebecca Hunter	UC	N/A	N/A
Liberal Democrats	Emma Jane Langman	UC	N/A	N/A
Liberal Democrats	Ian George Marks	UC	N/A	N/A
Independent	Colin Oakley	UC	N/A	N/A
Liberal Democrats	Karen Josette Rurlander	UC	N/A	N/A

== Lymm Parish Council - Lymm South ==
Lymm Parish Council - Lymm South (6 seats)
Party	Candidate	Votes	%	±%
Liberal Democrats	Sally Sharma	1,568	N/A	N/A
Liberal Democrats	Ann Johnstone	1,296	N/A	N/A
Liberal Democrats	Jenna Lombardi-Brown	1,206	N/A	N/A
Liberal Democrats	Luke William Stuttard	1,158	N/A	N/A
Liberal Democrats	Denis Patrick McAllister	1,098	N/A	N/A
Liberal Democrats	Benjamin Selwood	1,098	N/A	N/A
Conservative	Ian Pemberton	823	N/A	N/A

== Penketh Parish Council - East ==
Penketh Parish Council - East (2 seats)
Party	Candidate	Votes	%	±%
Independent	Tracey Booth	UC	N/A	N/A
Independent	Andrea Haywood	UC	N/A	N/A

== Penketh Parish Council - West ==
Penketh Parish Council - West (5 seats)
Party	Candidate	Votes	%	±%
Conservative	Chuck Eriobuna	UC	N/A	N/A
Independent	Geoff Fellows	UC	N/A	N/A
Independent	Laura Hollis	UC	N/A	N/A
Independent	Craig Lenihan	UC	N/A	N/A
Independent	Eunice Peters	UC	N/A	N/A

== Poulton-with-Fearnhead Parish Council - Blackbrook ==
Poulton-with-Fearnhead Parish Council - Blackbrook (1 seat)
Party	Candidate	Votes	%	±%
Labour	John Kerr-Brown	UC	N/A	N/A

== Poulton-with-Fearnhead Parish Council - Bruche ==
Poulton-with-Fearnhead Parish Council - Bruche (4 seats)
Party	Candidate	Votes	%	±%
Labour	Gillian Hannan	UC	N/A	N/A
Labour	Rebecca Anne Knowles	UC	N/A	N/A
Labour	Stephen John Rydzkowski	UC	N/A	N/A
Labour	Andy Warnock-Smith	UC	N/A	N/A

== Poulton-with-Fearnhead Parish Council - Cinnamon Brow ==
Poulton-with-Fearnhead Parish Council - Cinnamon Brow (4 seats)
Party	Candidate	Votes	%	±%
Labour	Jeffrey John Butler	UC	N/A	N/A
Labour	Bernard Franckel	UC	N/A	N/A
Labour	Graham Jeffrey Friend	UC	N/A	N/A
Labour	Oluchi Dominica Mellor	UC	N/A	N/A

== Poulton-with-Fearnhead Parish Council - Longbarn & Fearnhead ==
Poulton-with-Fearnhead Parish Council - Longbarn & Fearnhead (5 seats)
Party	Candidate	Votes	%	±%
Labour	Michelle Mansley	724	N/A	N/A
Labour	Sue Emery	696	N/A	N/A
Labour	Roland Green	696	N/A	N/A
Labour	Una Bernadette Gillham	683	N/A	N/A
Labour	Chris Ball	605	N/A	N/A
Conservative	Howard Klein	192	N/A	N/A

== Poulton-with-Fearnhead Parish Council - Paddington ==
Poulton-with-Fearnhead Parish Council - Paddington (1 seat)
Party	Candidate	Votes	%	±%
Labour	Laurence Sheridan	UC	N/A	N/A

== Rixton-with-Glazebrook Parish Council - Glazebrook ==
Rixton-with-Glazebrook Parish Council - Glazebrook (2 seats)
Party	Candidate	Votes	%	±%
Independent	Julie Eastty	UC	N/A	N/A
Independent	Phil Eastty	UC	N/A	N/A

== Rixton-with-Glazebrook Parish Council - Rixton ==
Rixton-with-Glazebrook Parish Council - Rixton (4 seats)
Party	Candidate	Votes	%	±%
Independent	Jayne Louise McKay	269	N/A	N/A
Independent	Julie Givvons	185	N/A	N/A
Independent	Liz Clarke	176	N/A	N/A
Independent	Dave McLachlan	146	N/A	N/A
Independent	Keith Whittam	93	N/A	N/A

== Stockton Heath Parish Council - East ==
Stockton Heath Parish Council - East (3 seats)
Party	Candidate	Votes	%	±%
Labour	Helen Jayne Dutton	UC	N/A	N/A
Labour	Ash North	UC	N/A	N/A
Liberal Democrats	Pamela Todd	UC	N/A	N/A

== Stockton Heath Parish Council - West ==
Stockton Heath Parish Council - West (11 seats)
Party	Candidate	Votes	%	±%
Labour	Sue Barlow	UC	N/A	N/A
Liberal Democrats	Sheila Lynne Dean	UC	N/A	N/A
Liberal Democrats	Kevin Gillibrand	UC	N/A	N/A
Liberal Democrats	Sharon Alicia Harris	UC	N/A	N/A
Liberal Democrats	Chris Jones	UC	N/A	N/A
Liberal Democrats	Tim Jordan	UC	N/A	N/A
Labour	Laurence James Murphy	UC	N/A	N/A
Conservative	Lyndsey Olsen	UC	N/A	N/A
Conservative	Stephen Howard Taylor	UC	N/A	N/A
Liberal Democrats	Peter John Walker	UC	N/A	N/A
Liberal Democrats	Judith Wheeler	UC	N/A	N/A

== Stretton Parish Council ==
Stretton Parish Council (4 seats)
Party	Candidate	Votes	%	±%
Independent	Dennis Buckley	UC	N/A	N/A
Independent	Bryan Jones	UC	N/A	N/A
Independent	Linda Elizabeth Jones	UC	N/A	N/A
Independent	Jill Osbourne	UC	N/A	N/A

== Walton Parish Council - Lower Walton ==
Walton Parish Council - Lower Walton (2 seats)
Party	Candidate	Votes	%	±%
Independent	Bob Hardie	UC	N/A	N/A
Liberal Democrats	Sharon Alicia Harris	UC	N/A	N/A

== Walton Parish Council - Higher Walton ==
Walton Parish Council - Higher Walton (4 seats)
Party	Candidate	Votes	%	±%
Independent	Richard Dryden Bennett	75	N/A	N/A
Independent	John Camillus Greene	53	N/A	N/A
Independent	Anita Jean Williams	50	N/A	N/A
Independent	David Hazeldine	49	N/A	N/A
Independent	Christina Jane Hewitt	37	N/A	N/A
Independent	Viv Lacey	37	N/A	N/A

== Winwick Parish Council - Peel Hall ==
Winwick Parish Council - Peel Hall (3 seats)
Party	Candidate	Votes	%	±%
Independent	Andy Griffiths	UC	N/A	N/A
Independent	Theresa Murray	UC	N/A	N/A
Independent	Margaret Steen	UC	N/A	N/A

== Winwick Parish Council - Winwick ==
Winwick Parish Council - Winwick (3 seats)
Party	Candidate	Votes	%	±%
Independent	James Herron	UC	N/A	N/A
Independent	Emma Lavender	UC	N/A	N/A
Independent	Stuart Mann	UC	N/A	N/A

== Woolston Parish Council - East ==
Woolston Parish Council - East (3 seats)
Party	Candidate	Votes	%	±%
Conservative	Howard Klein	UC	N/A	N/A
Independent	Paul Steven Smith	UC	N/A	N/A
Conservative	Rob Tynan	UC	N/A	N/A

== Woolston Parish Council - West ==
Woolston Parish Council - West (1 seat)
Party	Candidate	Votes	%	±%
Labour	Stephen John Rydzkowski	UC	N/A	N/A
