= Bridgewater High School, Warrington =

School in Warrington, Cheshire, England

Bridgewater High School

Location
- Appleton, Warrington (Cheshire); England; 53.3568°N 2.5751°W

Information
- Type: Academy The Challenge Academy Trust
- Local authority: Warrington
- Department for Education URN: 141598 Tables
- Ofsted: Reports
- Principal: Keiron Powell
- Head teacher: Tracey Hatton
- Staff: 220+
- Gender: Coeducational
- Age: 11 to 16
- Enrolment: 1,500+ pupils
- Houses: Stockton and Appleton
- Colours: Blue and white
- Publication: The Bridge
- Website: www.bridgewaterhigh.com

Bridgewater High School is a coeducational secondary school, located over two sites in Appleton, Warrington, Cheshire. The current principal is Keiron Powell, with Tracey Hatton as Head Teacher.

== History ==
The school was formed in 1987 by the amalgamation of Appleton Hall County Grammar School and Stockton Heath County High School. Appleton Hall became the new school's Lower Site, while Stockton Heath (known locally as Broomfields after the attached leisure centre) became the Upper Site.

== Notable former pupils ==
- Rebekah Brooks (née Wade), journalist and first female editor of the Sun
- Tim Firth, playwright/screenwriter whose works include Calendar Girls
- Ruby O'Donnell, actress who plays Peri Lomax in Hollyoaks
