= Beamont Collegiate Academy =

Mixed secondary school in the Orford area of Warrington, Cheshire, England

Location
- Long Lane; Orford; Warrington, Cheshire, WA2 8PX; England
- Coordinates: 53.40735°N 2.58827°W

Information
- Type: Academy
- Department for Education URN: 139196 Tables
- Ofsted: Reports
- Principal: Paul Greenhalgh
- Gender: Mixed
- Age: 11 to 16
- Enrolment: 766- as of January 2015
- Website: bca.warrington.ac.uk

Beamont Collegiate Academy (formerly William Beamont Community High School) is a mixed secondary school in the Orford area of Warrington, Cheshire, England. The school is named after William Beamont, a Victorian philanthropist and the first mayor of Warrington.

Previously a community school administered by Warrington Borough Council, William Beamont Community High School converted to academy status in 2013 and was renamed Beamont Collegiate Academy. The school was previously sponsored by Warrington Collegiate, but was a founding member of the Challenge Academy Trust in 2016.

The school moved into a new building in 2016, funded by the Government's Priority Schools Building Programme, on the same site and constructed by Wates Group.

On the 21 May 2025, Gareth Harris stepped down from his role as principal.

== Notable attendees ==
Former Manchester United footballer, Jesse Lingard, attended the school. Also current Warrington Wolves rugby league player Danny Walker attended the school.
