= 2021 Warrington Borough Council election =

2021 election in Warrington, England

Map showing the results of the 2021 Warrington Borough Council election

The 2021 Warrington Borough Council election took place on 6 May 2021 to elect members of Warrington Borough Council in England. This was on the same day as other local elections. All 58 seats were up for election.

These elections were originally scheduled for May 2020, but were delayed by one year due to the COVID-19 pandemic.

The Labour Party retained overall control of Warrington Borough Council after winning 35 of the 58 seats.

== Results ==
Warrington Borough Council election, 2021
Party	Seats	Gains	Losses	Net gain/loss	Seats %	Votes %	Votes	+/−
Labour	35	0	10	▼10	60.35	38.90	54,519	▼9.90
Conservative	11	10	1	▲9	18.96	36.64	51,345	▲13.65
Liberal Democrats	9	1	3	▼2	15.52	16.04	22,479	▼4.59
Independent	3	3	0	▲3	5.17	6.10	8,552	▲4.25
Green	0	0	0	Steady	0.00	2.32	3,242	▲1.03

== Council composition ==
Prior to the election the composition of the council was:

↓
45	11	2
Labour	Lib Dem	Con

After the election the composition of the council was:

↓
35	11	9	3
Labour	Conservative	Lib Dem	IND

Lib Dem – Liberal Democrats
Con – Conservative
IND – Independent

== Ward results ==
Incumbent councillors are denoted by an asterisk (*). References:

=== Appleton ===
Appleton (3 seats)
Party	Candidate	Votes	%	±%
Conservative	Mark Christopher Jervis	2,024	47.5	+16.6
Conservative	Ghazala Chapman	1,989	46.7	+21.1
Conservative	Kenneth David Critchley	1,926	45.2	+24.2
Liberal Democrats	Peter Russell Lewenz	1,628	38.2	−24.7
Liberal Democrats	Sharon Alicia Harris*	1,551	36.4	−10.7
Liberal Democrats	Mark Damen Browne	1,497	35.1	−23.4
Labour	Denis James Thomas Matthews	529	12.4	−3.6
Labour	Robin Michael David Frith	511	12.0	N/A
Labour	Andrew Alexander Warnock-Smith	478	11.2	N/A
Turnout		4,278	50.59	+8.59
Conservative gain from Liberal Democrats		Swing		
Conservative gain from Liberal Democrats		Swing		
Conservative gain from Liberal Democrats		Swing		

=== Bewsey and Whitecross ===
Bewsey and Whitecross (3 seats)
Party	Candidate	Votes	%	±%
Labour Co-op	Sarah Edith Hall*	1,046	53.2	−13.1
Labour Co-op	Steve Wright*	925	47.1	−15.6
Labour Co-op	Tom Jennings*	879	44.7	−16.9
Conservative	Cecilia Margaret Critchley	453	23.1	+9.5
Independent	Beth Trainer	423	21.5	N/A
Conservative	Anthony John Kerrigan	390	19.8	+7.6
Conservative	Carl Andrew Olsen	344	17.5	N/A
Liberal Democrats	Robert Timmis	340	17.3	−1.2
Turnout		1,986	22.78	+0.78
Labour hold		Swing		
Labour hold		Swing		
Labour hold		Swing		

=== Birchwood ===
Birchwood (3 seats)
Party	Candidate	Votes	%	±%
Labour	Russ Bowden*	1,521	52.2	−7.4
Labour	David Michael Ellis	1,389	47.7	−7.1
Conservative	Nigel William Balding	1,076	37.0	+9.9
Labour	Judith Mary Guthrie	1,073	36.8	−14.4
Conservative	Craig Peter Allen	1,068	36.7	+15.3
Conservative	Paul Adam Young	743	25.5	N/A
Liberal Democrats	Matt Scott	351	12.1	+1.6
Liberal Democrats	David John Eccles	298	10.2	N/A
Turnout		2,928	35.05	+0.05
Labour hold		Swing		
Labour hold		Swing		
Conservative gain from Labour		Swing		

=== Burtonwood & Winwick ===
Burtonwood & Winwick (2 seats)
Party	Candidate	Votes	%	±%
Labour	Alex Abbey	986	54.1	−8.6
Labour	Cathy Mitchell*	958	52.6	−11.1
Conservative	Paul Thomas Campbell	579	31.8	+8.3
Conservative	Theresa-Jane Murray	564	31.0	N/A
Liberal Democrats	Edgar John Davies	108	5.9	−9.7
Turnout		1,843	36.38	+2.38
Labour hold		Swing		
Labour hold		Swing		

=== Chapelford and Old Hall ===
Chapelford and Old Hall (3 seats)
Party	Candidate	Votes	%	±%
Labour Co-op	Steve Parish*	1,224	41.8	−1.9
Labour Co-op	Paul Joseph Warburton	1,186	40.5	−15.6
Conservative	Linda Margaret Butler	1,104	37.7	+15.4
Labour Co-op	Rebecca Anne Knowles*	1,088	37.1	−1.0
Conservative	Ian Anthony Wilson	972	33.2	+19.5
Conservative	Summit Tuli	908	31.0	+18.5
Liberal Democrats	Allan Keith Bird	567	19.4	−6.9
Green	Sarah Louise Williamson	465	15.9	N/A
Green	Michael Andrew Wass	204	7.0	−0.7
Liberal Democrats	Cliff Taylor	168	5.7	−11.7
Turnout		2,965	33.68	+2.68
Labour hold		Swing		
Labour hold		Swing		
Conservative gain from Labour		Swing		

=== Culcheth, Glazebury & Croft ===
Culcheth, Glazebury & Croft (3 seats)
Party	Candidate	Votes	%	±%
Conservative	Carol Ruth Benson	1,942	48.7	+8.8
Conservative	Valerie Margaret Allen	1,923	48.3	+11.2
Conservative	Wendy Maisey	1,845	46.3	+7.6
Labour	Matt Smith*	1,556	39.0	−13.5
Labour	Ben Alldred	1,442	36.2	−11.1
Labour	Jan Davidson*	1,154	29.0	−12.1
Green	Gary Lloyd Williams	520	13.0	N/A
Liberal Democrats	Eddie Sloane	362	9.1	−3.6
Turnout		4,013	45.43	+5.43
Conservative gain from Labour		Swing		
Conservative gain from Labour		Swing		
Conservative gain from Labour		Swing		

=== Fairfield and Howley ===
Fairfield and Howley (3 seats)
Party	Candidate	Votes	%	±%
Labour	Jean Flaherty*	1,201	60.5	+3.3
Labour	Tony Higgins*	1,057	53.2	+6.5
Labour	Sagheer Zaman	883	44.5	−1.7
Conservative	Stephen Crawshaw	538	27.1	+11.7
Conservative	Simone Samantha-Louise Davies	446	22.5	N/A
Conservative	Peter John Donleavy	397	20.0	N/A
Green	Denise Jane Harris	304	15.3	−0.6
Liberal Democrats	Constance Merril Cummerson	178	9.0	−2.1
Green	Jamie Martin	177	8.9	N/A
Turnout		1,997	23.38	−3.62
Labour hold		Swing		
Labour hold		Swing		
Labour hold		Swing		

=== Grappenhall ===
Grappenhall (2 seats)
Party	Candidate	Votes	%	±%
Liberal Democrats	Ryan Stephen Robert Bate*	1,335	49.1	−3.3
Liberal Democrats	Michael John Biggin*	1,136	41.8	−19.4
Conservative	Simon Christopher Brookes	1,052	38.7	+12.2
Conservative	Joanne Shanthi Freeman	803	29.5	+9.8
Labour	David Cundy	261	9.6	−8.2
Labour	Stephen James Price	258	9.5	N/A
Green	Kenneth Robin Wilson	194	7.1	N/A
Turnout		2,741	49.40	+14.40
Liberal Democrats hold		Swing		
Liberal Democrats hold		Swing		

=== Great Sankey North and Whittle Hall ===
Great Sankey North and Whittle Hall (3 seats)
Party	Candidate	Votes	%	±%
Labour	Jane Whalen	1,184	40.4	−13.8
Labour	Hitesh Patel	1,143	39.0	−12.9
Labour	Janet Henshaw	1,007	34.3	−15.7
Conservative	Pete Pinnington	824	28.1	−0.6
Conservative	Oliver James Paterson	766	26.1	−1.3
Independent	Nigel John Catlow	722	24.6	N/A
Conservative	Theo Jairaj Mirfin	644	22.0	−5.1
Independent	Dave Clark	542	18.5	N/A
Green	Stephanie Davies	432	14.7	+1.1
Liberal Democrats	Anthony James Tobin	277	9.4	−4.1
Turnout		2,953	37.34	+2.34
Labour hold		Swing		
Labour hold		Swing		
Labour hold		Swing		

=== Great Sankey South ===
Great Sankey South (3 seats)
Party	Candidate	Votes	%	±%
Labour	Amanda Marie King*	1,512	60.5	−2.4
Labour	Laura Watson	1,415	56.6	+4.2
Labour	Mo Hussain	1,363	54.6	+3.9
Conservative	Adam Thomas Patrick Wilson	916	36.7	+12.7
Conservative	Christopher Goldie	855	34.2	+12.5
Conservative	Ash Prakash	803	32.1	+14.4
Liberal Democrats	Roy Alfred Smith	379	15.2	+5.2
Turnout		2,530	30.10	+3.40
Labour hold		Swing		
Labour hold		Swing		
Labour hold		Swing		

=== Latchford East ===
Latchford East (2 seats)
Party	Candidate	Votes	%	±%
Labour Co-op	Hans Josef Mundry*	922	59.9	−6.9
Labour Co-op	Karen Elizabeth Mundry*	917	59.6	+0.5
Conservative	Heather Winifred Allan	377	24.5	+10.7
Conservative	Tobias Sebastian Fox	375	24.4	+14.0
Liberal Democrats	Denis Patrick McAllister	149	9.7	−0.4
Turnout		1,558	24.05	+1.05
Labour hold		Swing		
Labour hold		Swing		

=== Latchford West ===
Latchford West (2 seats)
Party	Candidate	Votes	%	±%
Labour	Maureen Penelope McLaughlin*	909	43.1	−10.6
Labour	Les Morgan*	859	40.7	−17.2
Conservative	Amanda Louise Bowles	793	37.6	+20.2
Conservative	Stephen Howard Taylor	787	37.3	+20.1
Liberal Democrats	Sally Jane Chisholm	207	9.8	−5.5
Liberal Democrats	Julia Kate Stansfield	169	8.0	−6.7
Turnout		2,128	36.07	+4.07
Labour hold		Swing		
Labour hold		Swing		

=== Lymm North and Thelwall ===
Lymm North and Thelwall (3 seats)
Party	Candidate	Votes	%	±%
Liberal Democrats	Bob Barr*	2,129	52.2	−2.7
Liberal Democrats	Ian George Marks*	2,103	51.6	−1.0
Liberal Democrats	Wendy Johnson*	1,735	42.6	−3.0
Conservative	Stephen Philip Chadwick	1,211	29.7	+6.5
Conservative	Julia Frances Leigh	1,210	29.7	+9.8
Conservative	Roger Nicholas Longton	1,100	27.0	+8.6
Labour	Chris Brownhill	900	22.1	−2.1
Labour	Ken Wormald	657	16.1	N/A
Labour	Marc Victor Rufus	601	14.7	N/A
Turnout		4,095	45.10	+4.10
Liberal Democrats hold		Swing		
Liberal Democrats hold		Swing		
Liberal Democrats hold		Swing		

=== Lymm South ===
Lymm South (2 seats)
Party	Candidate	Votes	%	±%
Conservative	Kath Buckley*	1,119	44.4	+4.8
Liberal Democrats	Graham Farrington Gowland	1,019	40.4	+10.3
Liberal Democrats	Tim Martland	895	35.5	+0.4
Conservative	Ian Pemberton	859	34.0	−7.7
Labour	Trish Cockayne	382	15.1	−5.9
Labour	Cheryl Marie Anderson	296	11.7	N/A
Independent	Joe Griffiths	239	9.5	N/A
Turnout		2,529	49.67	+5.67
Conservative hold		Swing		
Liberal Democrats gain from Conservative		Swing		

=== Orford ===
Orford (3 seats)
Party	Candidate	Votes	%	±%
Labour	Helen Charlotte Milner	1,036	45.0	−23.1
Labour	Claire Ellen Lloyd-Fitzgerald	984	42.7	−20.0
Labour	Morgan Alan William Tarr*	856	37.2	−19.1
Conservative	Carol Anne Kilgannon	772	33.5	+26.5
Conservative	Stephen Murphy	742	32.2	N/A
Conservative	Nicholas Forshaw	651	28.3	N/A
Independent	Trevor Nicholls	349	15.1	N/A
Liberal Democrats	Celia Elizabeth Jordan	170	7.4	+1.1
Turnout		2,322	26.18	+1.18
Labour hold		Swing		
Labour hold		Swing		
Labour hold		Swing		

=== Penketh and Cuerdley ===
Penketh and Cuerdley (3 seats)
Party	Candidate	Votes	%	±%
Independent	Andy Heaver	1,473	42.1	N/A
Independent	Geoffrey Fellows	1,391	39.8	N/A
Independent	Craig Joseph Lenihan	1,361	38.9	N/A
Labour	Linda Susan Dirir*	1,038	29.7	−19.9
Labour	Amy Charlotte Brookes	1,021	29.2	−24.0
Conservative	Michael Andrew Potts	943	27.0	−16.2
Labour	Kenny Watson	827	23.6	−25.1
Conservative	Lucy Gemma Davies	795	22.7	−13.0
Conservative	Matthew Marshall	678	19.4	−14.4
Liberal Democrats	Pam Todd	143	4.1	−4.2
Turnout		3,530	42.74	+5.74
Independent gain from Labour		Swing		
Independent gain from Labour		Swing		
Independent gain from Labour		Swing		

=== Poplars and Hulme ===
Poplars and Hulme (3 seats)
Party	Candidate	Votes	%	±%
Labour	Nathan James John Sudworth	1,047	58.2	+2.0
Labour	John Sidney Kerr-Brown*	942	52.4	−9.2
Labour	Hilary Cooksey*	887	49.3	−7.6
Conservative	Chloe Demi Birchall	578	32.1	+20.7
Conservative	Rowland Blackstock	382	21.2	N/A
Conservative	Charles Basil Mitchell	360	20.0	N/A
Independent	Mal Lingley	241	13.4	−9.3
Liberal Democrats	Mike Anderson	125	6.9	−0.4
Turnout		1,812	20.53	−2.47
Labour hold		Swing		
Labour hold		Swing		
Labour hold		Swing		

=== Poulton North ===
Poulton North (3 seats)
Party	Candidate	Votes	%	±%
Labour	Diana Friend*	1,172	43.2	−13.5
Labour	Graham Jeffrey Friend*	1,126	41.5	−15.2
Labour	Sue Emery	956	35.3	−13.8
Conservative	William David Gibson	804	29.7	+1.7
Conservative	Ben Anthony Duncanson	799	29.5	N/A
Green	Geoff Settle	727	26.8	N/A
Conservative	Isaac Tweedale	709	26.2	N/A
Independent	Jon Parr	544	20.1	N/A
Liberal Democrats	Scott Wilson	203	7.5	−21.7
Liberal Democrats	Tim Harwood	152	5.6	N/A
Turnout		2,724	33.97	+1.97
Labour hold		Swing		
Labour hold		Swing		
Labour hold		Swing		

=== Poulton South ===
Poulton South (2 seats)
Party	Candidate	Votes	%	±%
Labour	Maureen Ann Creaghan*	788	48.3	+0.8
Labour	Stephen John Rydzkowski	745	45.6	−16.3
Conservative	Howard Martin Klein	594	36.4	+13.7
Conservative	Steven William Stewart	540	33.1	N/A
Liberal Democrats	David Crowther	144	8.8	−2.9
Liberal Democrats	Daniel Gregory Warren	136	8.3	N/A
Turnout		1,650	34.21	+4.21
Labour hold		Swing		
Labour hold		Swing		

=== Rixton and Woolston ===
Rixton and Woolston (3 seats)
Party	Candidate	Votes	%	±%
Conservative	Joshua Thomas Dixon	1,250	42.2	+20.4
Labour	Andrew John Hill*	1,157	39.1	−8.1
Conservative	Phil Eastty	1,120	37.9	+20.0
Labour	Pat Wright*	1,069	36.1	−2.0
Conservative	Rob Tynan	1,064	36.0	+20.0
Labour	Faisal Rashid	970	32.8	−18.3
Independent	Paul Andrew Bray	412	13.9	N/A
Liberal Democrats	Helen Speed	295	10.0	+3.5
Liberal Democrats	Brian Alistair Meichen	294	9.9	N/A
Turnout		2,978	38.90	+4.90
Conservative gain from Labour		Swing		
Labour hold		Swing		
Conservative gain from Labour		Swing		

=== Stockton Heath ===
Stockton Heath (2 seats)
Party	Candidate	Votes	%	±%
Liberal Democrats	Judith Carol Wheeler	1,012	38.9	+3.6
Liberal Democrats	Peter John Walker*	999	38.4	−8.9
Conservative	Bill Kidley	885	34.0	+4.7
Conservative	Lyndsey Jane Olsen	837	32.2	+7.0
Labour	Laurence James Murphy	504	19.4	−7.3
Labour	Gary Leonard Slater	444	17.1	−5.6
Green	Lyndsay McAteer	219	8.4	+2.0
Turnout		2,620	46.27	+5.27
Liberal Democrats hold		Swing		
Liberal Democrats hold		Swing		

=== Westbrook ===
Westbrook (2 seats)
Party	Candidate	Votes	%	±%
Labour	Siobhan Maureen Carr	659	34.5	−4.6
Labour	Brian Gallagher	619	32.4	+1.6
Conservative	Marta Anna Paszkowska	610	31.9	+13.1
Conservative	Nisha Jethalal Shah	507	26.5	N/A
Independent	Debra Laura Duddle	428	22.4	N/A
Independent	Jason Ian Webb	427	22.3	N/A
Liberal Democrats	Judith Mary Walker	114	6.0	−47.4
Liberal Democrats	Brian Michael Davies	110	5.8	−23.9
Turnout		1,916	36.93	+4.93
Labour gain from Liberal Democrats		Swing		
Labour hold		Swing		

== By-elections ==
=== Grappenhall ===
Grappenhall (2 seats): 29 September 2022
Party	Candidate	Votes	%	±%
Liberal Democrats	Helen Speed	1,073	42.9	N/A
Liberal Democrats	Mark Browne	1,047	41.8	N/A
Conservative	Moira Dolan	524	20.9	N/A
Conservative	Philip Ford	462	18.5	N/A
Labour	Denis Matthews	193	7.7	N/A
Green	Denise Harris	135	5.4	N/A
Turnout		2,502	44.3	
Registered electors		5,645		
Liberal Democrats hold				
Liberal Democrats hold				

=== Rixton & Woolston ===
Rixton & Woolston: 24 November 2022
Party	Candidate	Votes	%	±%
Conservative	Rob Tynan	648	42.9	+2.8
Labour	Trish Cockayne	645	42.7	+5.5
Liberal Democrats	Brian Meichen	219	14.5	+5.0
Majority		3	0.2	
Turnout		1,512	20.5	
Registered electors		7,366		
Conservative hold		Swing	▼1.4	

=== Latchford West ===
Latchford West: 20 April 2023
Party	Candidate	Votes	%	±%
Labour	Denis Matthews	662	40.8	–6.8
Conservative	Stephen Taylor	488	30.1	–11.4
Liberal Democrats	Sharon Harris	274	16.9	+6.1
Independent	Amanda Bowles	199	12.3	N/A
Majority		174	10.7	
Turnout		1,628	28.3	
Registered electors		5,752		
Labour hold		Swing	▲2.3	

=== Poulton North ===
Poulton North: 27 July 2023
Party	Candidate	Votes	%	±%
Labour	Una Gillham	999	56.3	+22.3
Conservative	Howard Klein	606	34.2	+10.9
Liberal Democrats	Timothy Harwood	168	9.5	+3.6
Majority		393	22.1	
Turnout		1,788	23.1	
Registered electors		7,758		
Labour hold		Swing	▲5.9	
