= Mayor of Warrington =

The Mayor of Warrington is the highest-ranking officer in the municipal government of Warrington, England.

== Role ==
The Mayor of Warrington, as the first person of the borough, chairs meetings of Warrington Borough Council. Elected for one year, the mayor also is a representative of the town who is responsible for officially welcoming people and inviting people to the town. The mayor officially hosts civic events of the town. In this role and the mayor promotes the town of Warrington to attract more investment and visitors to the area.

== History ==
The first mayor of Warrington was William Beamont. He became mayor following the incorporation of the borough in 1847. At that time, 27 councillors from the then much smaller borough were appointed to the small town hall in the centre of modern Warrington. As the town increased in size, the council was moved to Bank Hall, the former home of Lord Winmarleigh for £9,700. This is still the town hall and its "golden gates" are one of the town's attractions.

== List of Mayors (1998-Present) ==
The Mayor's role is to perform civic duties across the Borough, such as attending large events in different communities and taking the lead on certain recognised days, such as Remembrance Sunday. The Mayor has no power over policies, as that is the job of the Leader of the Council. The Mayor must be an elected Councillor as they also chair Full Council meetings. Though elected as a Councillor representing a particular Party, the Mayor remains impartial when chairing but also has a vote of their own (often voting with their Party line).

The Mayors since 1998 have been:

Councillor	Party	From	To
Albert Clemow	Labour	1998	1999
Tom Swift	Labour	1999	2000
Sheila Woodyatt	Conservative	2000	2001
Jeff Richards	Labour	2001	2002
George Warburton	Labour	2002	2003
Pauline Nelson	Labour	2003	2004
Edward Lafferty	Liberal Democrats	2004	2005
Hans Mundry	Labour	2005	2006
Linda Dirir	Labour	2006	2007
Celia Jordan	Liberal Democrats	2007	2008
Graham Welborne	Liberal Democrats	2008	2009
Brian Axcell	Liberal Democrats	2009	2010
John Joyce	Labour	2010	2011
Michael Biggin	Liberal Democrats	2011	2012
Steve Wright	Labour	2012	2013
Peter Carey	Labour	2013	2014
Ted Finnegan	Liberal Democrats	2014	2015
Geoff Settle	Labour	2015	2016
Faisal Rashid	Labour	2016	2017
Les Morgan	Labour	2017	2018
Karen Mundry	Labour	2018	2019
Wendy Johnson	Liberal Democrats	2019	2020
Maureen Creaghan	Labour	2021	2022
Jean Flaherty	Labour	2022	2023
Steve Wright	Labour	2023	2024
Wendy Johnson	Liberal Democrats	2024	2025
Mo Hussain	Labour	2025	2026
Sagheer Zaman	Labour	2026	2027
