= William Beamont =

British politician and historian (1797–1889)

Councillor William Beamont FSA
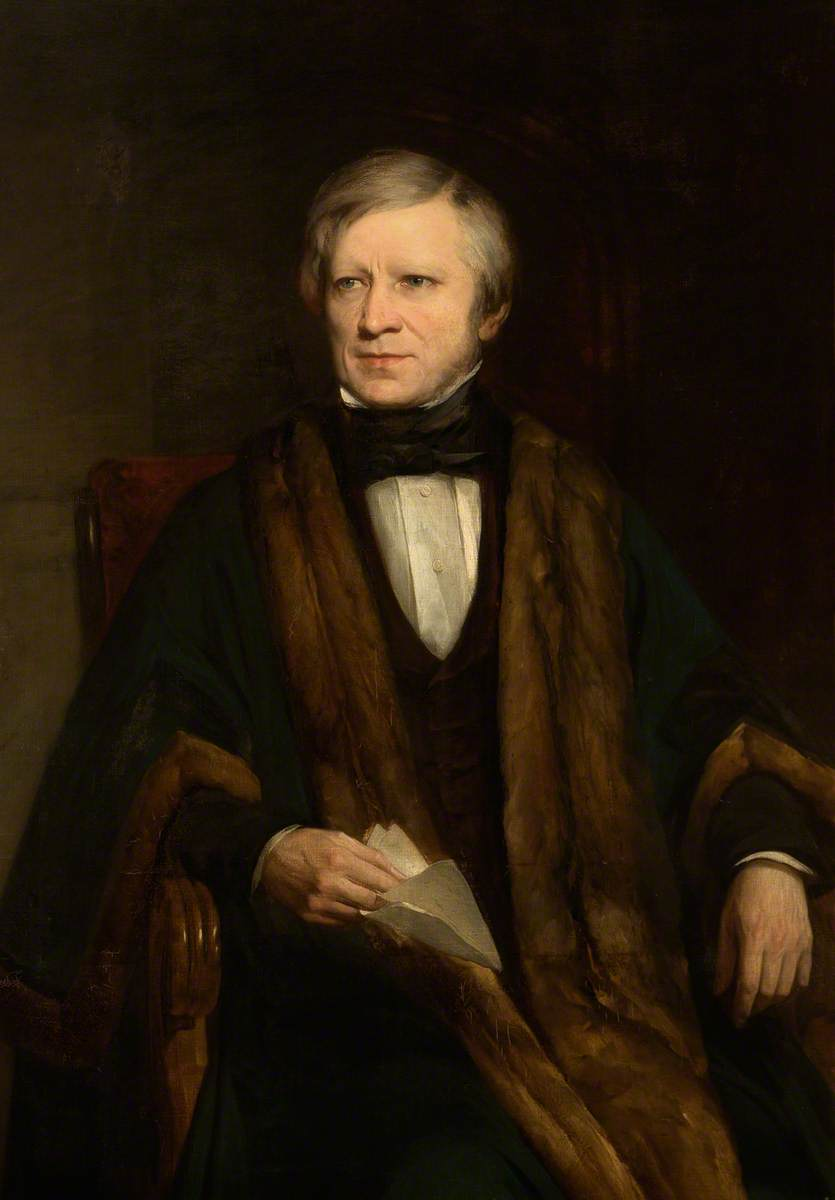
- William Beamont

Mayor of Warrington
- In office 1847–1848

Councillor for Warrington
- In office 1847–1848

Personal details
- Born: William Beamont; 1797
- Died: 1889
- Spouse: Ann Gaskell
- Children: 1
- Occupation: Solicitor; Politician; Antiquary; Philanthropist

William Beamont FSA (1797–1889) was an English solicitor and local philanthropist. He lived in the town of Warrington, in the north-west of England.

== Life ==
Beamont was the first mayor of Warrington after its incorporation as a municipal borough in 1847. As mayor, he founded its municipal library, the first rate-aided library in the UK, in 1848. He travelled extensively, including in the Holy Land, where he met William Holman Hunt. His diaries, stored in the town's main library, are a valuable source of social history. For many years he lived at Orford Hall. Beamont was a Member of the Chetham Society, and served as Member of Council (1849–82) and Vice-President (1879–82). He was also a Fellow of the Society of Antiquaries of London.

A high school (Beamont Collegiate Academy) and a primary school in the town are named after him.

His grave lies in the churchyard of Christ Church, Padgate, one of several Church of England churches that he helped found.

== Family ==
Beamont married Ann Gaskell (died 1859), daughter of John Gaskell of Warrington. After Ann's death, he went on to marry Letitia Naegeli in 1863. He outlived his only son William John Beamont, who was a clergyman and author.

Professional and academic associations
Preceded by Francis Robert Raines	Vice-President of the Chetham Society; 1879–82	Succeeded by Richard Copley Christie
Preceded by William Fergusson Irvine	Vice-President of the Record Society of Lancashire and Cheshire; 1878–80	Succeeded by George Little
