= Bewsey and Whitecross =

Electoral ward in Cheshire, England

Coordinates: 53.3973°N 2.6084°W

Bewsey
- Location within Cheshire
- Population: 3,330 (2001)
- OS grid reference: SJ595891
- Unitary authority: Warrington
- Ceremonial county: Cheshire
- Region: North West
- Country: England
- Sovereign state: United Kingdom
- Post town: Warrington
- Postcode district: WA5
- Dialling code: 01925
- Police: Cheshire
- Fire: Cheshire
- Ambulance: North West
- UK Parliament: Warrington South

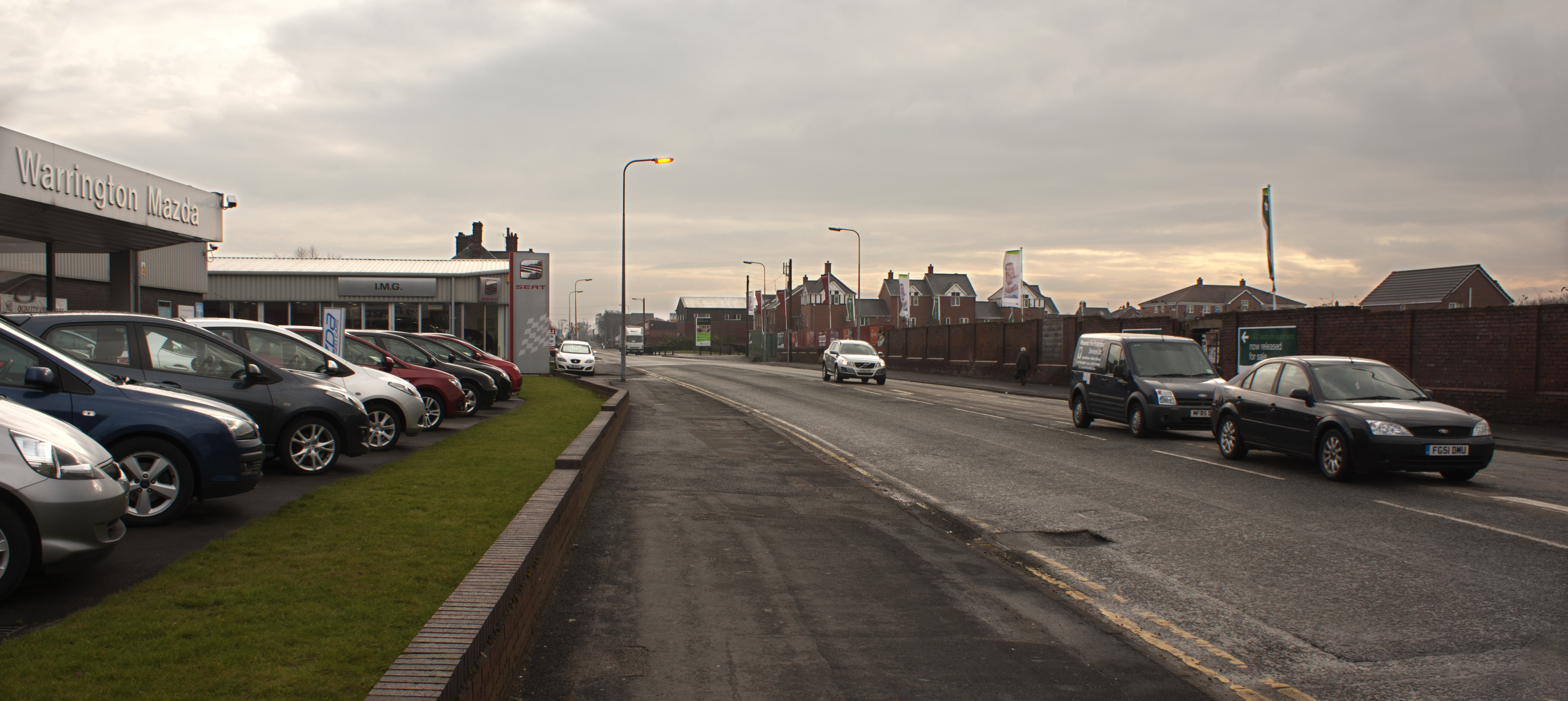
Bewsey Road

Bewsey and Whitecross is a ward to the west of the town centre of Warrington (and includes much of the town centre), in the Warrington district, in the ceremonial county of Lancashire, England. The town's General Hospital is within the ward. The area is served by the 16/16A bus route from Dallam to Warrington. Sankey Valley Park runs through Bewsey, there are community centres at Whitecross and Bewsey Park, and a community and health hub is to be built to serve the former council estates of Bewsey and Dallam. There are five primary schools, while the nearest high schools are Beamont Collegiate Academy in the Orford area, Great Sankey High School in Great Sankey, and St Gregory's RC High School.

== Demographics ==
Note: Statistics expressed as percentages may not add up to 100%.

=== Politics ===
Bewsey and Whitecross ward is represented on Warrington Borough Council by three councillors.

=== Census data ===
Data is based on that of Bewsey and Whitecross Ward.

==== Population and ethnicity ====
Bewsey and Whitecross ward has a population of 9,840 residents. 49.3% are male and 50.7% are female. The average age of the population at the census was 36.1 years. Of the 9,840 residents, 96.2% of the population describe their ethnicity as white. Other significant minorities are mixed (0.6%), black (0.4%)and Asian (2.1%). Other races account for 0.7% of the population.

==== Housing and social situation ====
In the ward, there are 4,431 households, of which 51.5% are owner-occupied. 34.1% account for council housing, 11.2% are rented from private landlords and 3.1% of houses have residents who live rent free. In the last two quarters of 2005, the average price of a house in Bewsey was £132,235. The population density of Bewsey and Whitecross is 12.6 residents per hectare. Also, 8.3% of households are classed as overcrowded. According to the ACORN index, 49.6% of residents describe Bewsey and Whitecross as a "hard-pressed" area. According to the indices of multiple deprivation, the ward falls into the slightly below average ward economically. 12.8% of residents are on benefits.

==== Employment and education ====
In the ward, employment rate stands at 58.2% of the population. On top of this, 5.0% of all economically active residents are unemployed (this is significantly above the Warrington unemployment rate of 2.9%), 1.7% are students in full-time education. 35.0% are classed as "economically inactive" (due to long-term disability, retirement or full-time carer status). In terms of education, 37.25 have no qualifications whatsoever. The majority (46%) have level one (at least 1+ GCSE at A*-G or equivalent) or level two (at least 5+ GCSEs at A*-G or 1 A-Level at A-E or equivalent) qualifications. 11.0% have level three or higher (at least 2+ A-levels (A-E) or 4+ AS-levels at A-E or equivalent) qualifications.
