= 2016 Warrington Borough Council election =

2016 UK local government election

- 5 May 2016

All 58 seats to Warrington Borough Council 30 seats needed for a majority
	First party	Second party	Third party
Party	Labour	Liberal Democrats	Conservative
Seats won	45	11	2
Seat change	▲3	▲2	▼3
Popular vote	59,031	24,953	27,816
Percentage	48.8%	20.6%	23.0%
	Fourth party
Party	TUSC
Seats won	0
Seat change	▼1
Popular vote	1,719
Percentage	1.4%
- Results by ward
Council control before election
Labour Party (UK)
Council control after election
Labour Party (UK)

The 2016 Warrington Borough Council election took place on 5 May 2016 to elect members of Warrington Borough Council in England. This was on the same day as other local elections.

Following a boundary review, all Warrington Borough Council seats were up for election, for a term of four years. The number of seats rose from 57 to 58.

The Labour Party retained overall control of Warrington Borough Council after taking 45 of the 58 seats.

== Results summary ==
Warrington Borough Council election, 2016
Party	Seats	Gains	Losses	Net gain/loss	Seats %	Votes %	Votes	+/−
Labour	45			▲3	77.59	48.80	59,031	
Liberal Democrats	11			▲2	18.96	20.63	24,953	
Conservative	2			▼3	3.45	22.99	27,816	
UKIP	0			Steady	0	3.02	3,652	
Independent	0			Steady	0	1.85	2,245	
TUSC	0			▼1	0	1.42	1,719	
Green	0			Steady	0	1.29	1,559	

A total of 442 ballots were rejected, and the overall turnout was 32.87%.

== Council Composition ==
Prior to the election the composition of the council was:

↓
42	9	5	1
Labour	Lib Dem	Con	T

After the election the composition of the council was:

↓
45	11	2
Labour	Lib Dem	Con

Lib Dem - Liberal Democrats
Con - Conservative Party
T - Trade Unionist and Socialist Coalition (TUSC)

== Ward results ==
=== Appleton ===
Appleton (3 Seats)
Party	Candidate	Votes	%	±%
Liberal Democrats	Brian Axcell	2,191	62.9	
Liberal Democrats	Judith Carol Wheeler	2,034	58.5	
Liberal Democrats	Sharon Harris	1,640	47.1	
Conservative	Basil Mitchell	1,075	30.9	
Conservative	Barbara Price	891	25.6	
Conservative	Ian Houghton	731	21.0	
Labour	Nick Bent	556	16.0	
Green	David Edward Bilton	447	12.8	
Majority		565	16.2	
Turnout		9,565	42	
Liberal Democrats win				
Liberal Democrats win				
Liberal Democrats win				

=== Bewsey and Whitecross ===
Bewsey and Whitecross (3 Seats)
Party	Candidate	Votes	%	±%
Labour	Sarah Edith Hall	1,142	66.3	
Labour	Steve Wright	1,080	62.7	
Labour	Tom Jennings	1,061	61.6	
Liberal Democrats	Bob Timmis	319	18.5	
Conservative	Rowland Blackstock	235	13.6	
Conservative	Pat Smith	210	12.2	
Liberal Democrats	Irina Axcell	151	8.8	
Liberal Democrats	Judith Walker	135	7.8	
TUSC	Shelley Bennett	129	7.5	
Majority		742	43.1	
Turnout		4,462	22	
Labour win				
Labour win				
Labour win				

=== Birchwood ===
Birchwood (3 Seats)
Party	Candidate	Votes	%	±%
Labour	Russ Bowden	1,719	59.6	
Labour	Pauline Nelson	1,578	54.8	
Labour	Chris Fitzsimmons	1,475	51.2	
Conservative	Nigel Balding	782	27.1	
Conservative	Peter Linton	618	21.4	
Independent	Amy Elizabeth Linton	529	18.4	
Liberal Democrats	John Davies	302	10.5	
Majority		693	24.1	
Turnout		7,003	35	
Labour win				
Labour win				
Labour win				

=== Burtonwood and Winwick ===
Burtonwood and Winwick (3 Seats
Party	Candidate	Votes	%	±%
Labour	Cathy Mitchell	1,083	63.7	
Labour	Terry O'Neill	1,065	62.7	
Conservative	Robin Sloan	399	23.5	
Liberal Democrats	Timothy James Muttock	265	15.6	
Majority		666	39.2	
Turnout		2,812	34	
Labour win				
Labour win				

=== Chapelford and Old Hall ===
Chapelford and Old Hall (3 Seats)
Party	Candidate	Votes	%	±%
Labour	Faisal Rashid	1,489	56.1	
Labour	Steve Parish	1,161	43.7	
Labour	Rebecca Knowles	1,011	38.1	
Liberal Democrats	Allan Keith Bird	698	26.3	
Conservative	Phil Hayward	593	22.3	
Liberal Democrats	David Leonard Knapp	463	17.4	
Liberal Democrats	Roy Alfred Smith	397	15.0	
Conservative	Anthony John Kerrigan	364	13.7	
Conservative	Anna Jane Sharkey	332	12.5	
UKIP	Ian Anthony Wilson	332	12.5	
Green	Mike Wass	204	7.7	
Majority		313	11.8	
Turnout		7,044	31	
Labour win				
Labour win				
Labour win				

=== Culcheth, Glazebury and Croft ===
Culcheth, Glazebury and Croft (3 Seats)
Party	Candidate	Votes	%	±%
Labour	Matt Smith	1,788	52.5	
Labour	Joan Grime	1,609	47.3	
Labour	Jan Davidson	1,401	41.1	
Conservative	Frank Richard Allen	1,359	39.9	
Conservative	Sue Bland	1,318	38.7	
Conservative	Valerie Margaret Allen	1,263	37.1	
Liberal Democrats	Eddie Sloane	432	12.7	
Majority		42	1.2	
Turnout		9,170	40	
Labour win				
Labour win				
Labour win				

=== Fairfield and Howley ===
Fairfield and Howley (3 Seats)
Party	Candidate	Votes	%	±%
Labour	Jean Flaherty	1,234	57.2	
Labour	Tony Higgins	1,008	46.7	
Labour	Peter Carey	997	46.2	
TUSC	Kevin Bennett	921	42.7	
Green	Lyndsay McAteer	344	15.9	
Conservative	Simone Johnson	332	15.4	
Liberal Democrats	Ann Oldbury	240	11.1	
Majority		76	3.5	
Turnout		5,076	27	
Labour win				
Labour win				
Labour win				

=== Grappenhall ===
Grappenhall (2 Seats)
Party	Candidate	Votes	%	±%
Liberal Democrats	Mike Biggin	1,306	61.2	
Liberal Democrats	Ryan Stephen Robert Bate	1,119	52.4	
Conservative	Olivia Reilly	565	26.5	
Conservative	Iona Gillis	421	19.7	
Labour	Andy Heaver	380	17.8	
Majority		554	25.9	
Turnout		3,791	35	
Liberal Democrats win				
Liberal Democrats win				

=== Great Sankey North and Whittle Hall ===
Dan Price resigned from the Labour Party in February 2019 in protest at the party's inaction over antisemitism and Brexit. He subsequently sat on the council as an independent.

Great Sankey North and Whittle Hall (3 Seats)
Party	Candidate	Votes	%	±%
Labour	Jan Hart	1,321	54.2	
Labour	Dan Price	1,265	51.9	
Labour	Tony Williams	1,217	50.0	
Conservative	Mike Foxall	698	28.7	
Conservative	Christine Booth	668	27.4	
Conservative	Arthur Booth	660	27.1	
Green	Stephanie Davies	332	13.6	
Liberal Democrats	Cliff Taylor	330	13.5	
Majority		519	21.3	
Turnout		6,491	35	
Labour win				
Labour win				
Labour win				

=== Great Sankey South ===
Great Sankey South (3 Seats)
Party	Candidate	Votes	%	±%
Labour	Amanda King	1,432	62.9	
Labour	Hitesh Patel	1,193	52.4	
Labour	Jean Carter	1,154	50.7	
Conservative	Sue Jenkin	546	24.0	
Conservative	Peter Elton	494	21.7	
Conservative	Sonia Wendy Boggan	403	17.7	
Liberal Democrats	Tim Harwood	227	10.0	
TUSC	Andrew Ford	138	6.1	
Majority		608	26.7	
Turnout		5,587	28	
Labour win				
Labour win				
Labour win				

=== Latchford East ===
Latchford East (2 Seats)
Party	Candidate	Votes	%	±%
Labour	Hans Josef Mundry	929	66.8	
Labour	Karen Mundry	822	59.1	
Conservative	Julian Craddock	192	13.8	
Conservative	Ken Scates	145	10.4	
Liberal Democrats	Tim Price	140	10.1	
Liberal Democrats	Rupert Budgen	123	8.8	
Green	John Kennedy Lappin	85	6.1	
TUSC	Sue Hayes	83	6.0	
Majority		630	45.3	
Turnout		2,519	23	
Labour win				
Labour win				

=== Latchford West ===
Latchford West (2 Seats)
Party	Candidate	Votes	%	±%
Labour	Les Morgan	1,068	57.9	
Labour	Maureen McLaughlin	991	53.7	
Conservative	Michael Haworth	321	17.4	
Conservative	David Woodyatt	317	17.2	
Liberal Democrats	Ann Raymond	283	15.3	
Liberal Democrats	Celia Jordan	272	14.7	
TUSC	Dave Cundy	88	4.8	
Majority		670	36.3	
Turnout		3,340	32	
Labour win				
Labour win				

=== Lymm North and Thelwall ===
Lymm North and Thelwall (3 Seats)
Party	Candidate	Votes	%	±%
Liberal Democrats	Bob Barr	2,027	54.9	
Liberal Democrats	Ian George Marks	1,943	52.6	
Liberal Democrats	Wendy Johnson	1,685	45.6	
Labour	Chris Zastawny	895	24.2	
Conservative	Jonathan Michael Smith	857	23.2	
Conservative	Kevin Yates	735	19.9	
Conservative	Harish Chander Sharma	679	18.4	
UKIP	Derek Clark	530	14.3	
Majority		790	21.4	
Turnout		9,351	41	
Liberal Democrats win				
Liberal Democrats win				
Liberal Democrats win				

=== Lymm South ===
Lymm South (2 Seats)
Party	Candidate	Votes	%	±%
Conservative	Sheila Woodyatt	925	41.7	
Conservative	Kath Buckley	879	39.6	
Liberal Democrats	Ed Gough	780	35.1	
Liberal Democrats	Graham Farrington Gowland	668	30.1	
Labour	David John Cockayne	466	21.0	
UKIP	James Ashington	233	10.5	
Majority		99	4.5	
Turnout		3,951	44	
Conservative win				
Conservative win				

=== Orford ===
Orford (3 Seats)
Party	Candidate	Votes	%	±%
Labour	Mike Hannon	1,493	68.1	
Labour	Kerri Louise Morris	1,374	62.7	
Labour	Morgan Tarr	1,234	56.3	
UKIP	Ian Andrew Richards	420	19.2	
UKIP	Dion Eric Challinor	392	17.9	
UKIP	Sid Simmons	392	17.9	
Conservative	Jan Woning	154	7.0	
Liberal Democrats	Pam Marks	137	6.3	
Independent	Clive Lawrinson	117	5.3	
Majority		814	37.1	
Turnout		5,713	25	
Labour win				
Labour win				
Labour win				

=== Penketh and Cuerdley ===
Penketh and Cuerdley (3 Seats)
Party	Candidate	Votes	%	±%
Labour	David Keane	1,622	53.2	
Labour	Linda Susan Dirir	1,511	49.6	
Labour	Allin Dirir	1,486	48.7	
Conservative	Sam Baxter	1,317	43.2	
Conservative	Kevin Morton	1,087	35.7	
Conservative	Matt Jones	1,030	33.8	
Liberal Democrats	Denis Patrick McAllister	254	8.3	
Majority		169	5.5	
Turnout		8,307	37	
Labour win				
Labour win				
Labour win				

=== Poplars and Hulme ===
Poplars and Hulme (3 Seats)
Party	Candidate	Votes	%	±%
Labour	John Kerr-Brown	1,196	61.6	
Labour	Hilary Cooksey	1,103	56.9	
Labour	Brian Maher	1,090	56.2	
UKIP	Mike Byrne	463	23.9	
UKIP	Trevor Nicholls	450	23.2	
UKIP	Mal Lingley	440	22.7	
Conservative	Francine Leslie	222	11.4	
Liberal Democrats	Pam Todd	142	7.3	
Majority		627	32.3	
Turnout		5,106	23	
Labour win				
Labour win				
Labour win				

=== Poulton North ===
Poulton North (3 Seats)
Party	Candidate	Votes	%	±%
Labour	Diana Bennett	1,413	56.7	
Labour	Graham Friend	1,411	56.7	
Labour	Russell Purnell	1,222	49.1	
Liberal Democrats	Chris Oliver	726	29.2	
Conservative	Philip Eastty	696	28.0	
Majority		496	19.9	
Turnout		5,468	32	
Labour win				
Labour win				
Labour win				

=== Poulton South ===
Poulton South (2 Seats)
Party	Candidate	Votes	%	±%
Labour	Colin Froggatt	882	61.9	
Labour	Maureen Creaghan	678	47.5	
TUSC	Bob Taylor	360	25.2	
Conservative	Emma Sloan	324	22.7	
Liberal Democrats	Dave Hockenhull	167	11.7	
Majority		318	22.3	
Turnout		2,411	30	
Labour win				
Labour win				

=== Rixton and Woolston ===
Rixton and Woolston (3 Seats)
Party	Candidate	Votes	%	±%
Labour	Tony McCarthy	1,314	51.1	
Labour	Andrew Hill	1,214	47.2	
Labour	Pat Wright	979	38.1	
Independent	Bill Brinksman	882	34.3	
Independent	Paul Francis Bretherton	717	27.9	
Conservative	Mark Chapman	560	21.8	
Conservative	Howard Klein	460	17.9	
Conservative	Isaac Tweedale	411	16.0	
Liberal Democrats	Paul Wenlock	168	6.5	
Majority		97	3.8	
Turnout		6,705	34	
Labour win				
Labour win				
Labour win				

=== Stockton Heath ===
Stockton Heath (2 Seats)
Party	Candidate	Votes	%	±%
Liberal Democrats	Peter Walker	1,089	47.3	
Liberal Democrats	Graham Welborn	813	35.3	
Conservative	Stephen Howard Taylor	675	29.3	
Labour	Laurence Murphy	614	26.7	
Conservative	Jonathan Matthew Levy	581	25.2	
Labour	Sandra Eaves	522	22.7	
Green	Harry Gibbins	147	6.4	
Majority		138	6.0	
Turnout		4,441	41	
Liberal Democrats win				
Liberal Democrats win				

=== Westbrook ===
Westbrook (2 Seats)
Party	Candidate	Votes	%	±%
Liberal Democrats	Stefan Krizanac	827	53.4	
Labour	Judith Marie Guthrie	606	39.1	
Labour	John Joyce	477	30.8	
Liberal Democrats	Jeff Butler	460	29.7	
Conservative	Alex Leslie	292	18.8	
Majority		129	8.3	
Turnout		2,662	32	
Liberal Democrats win				
Labour win				
