= Appleton, Warrington =

Civil parish in Cheshire, England

Coordinates: 53.3508°N 2.5441°W

Appleton
- Location within Cheshire
- Population: 10,265
- OS grid reference: SJ620843
- Civil parish: Appleton
- Unitary authority: Warrington
- Ceremonial county: Cheshire
- Region: North West
- Country: England
- Sovereign state: United Kingdom
- Post town: WARRINGTON
- Postcode district: WA4
- Dialling code: 01925
- Police: Cheshire
- Fire: Cheshire
- Ambulance: North West
- UK Parliament: Warrington South

Appleton is a civil parish and suburb of Warrington, in the Warrington district, in the ceremonial county of Cheshire, England.

== Geography and landmarks ==
The A49 road runs from neighbouring Stockton Heath up the hill into Appleton and links Warrington town centre with the M56 motorway.

At the top of Appleton is Warrington Golf Club. There is also a large cemetery situated nearby which is named Fox Covert Cemetery. The cemetery is locally called Hillcliffe.

There are four schools in Appleton: Bridgewater High School, Broomfields Junior School, St Monica's Catholic Primary School and Cobbs Infant and Nursery School.

== Notable people ==
Beatle George Harrison bought his parents, Harry and Louise Harrison, a bungalow, Sevenoaks, on Old Pewterspear Lane in 1965 to enable them to escape the pressures of fans who visited their Liverpool home. Harrison wrote While My Guitar Gently Weeps at the bungalow.

Screenwriter Richard Curtis lived at Merricourt on Windmill Lane during the 1970s. His university friend Rowan Atkinson was an occasional visitor to the house.

Journalist and first female editor of the Sun Rebekah Brooks (nee Wade) attended Appleton Hall High School, now Bridgewater High School.

Playwright and screenwriter Tim Firth, famous for Calendar Girls, attended Appleton Hall High School.

Actress Ruby O'Donnell famous for playing as Peri Lomax in Hollyoaks was raised and brought up in Appleton.

== See also ==
- Listed buildings in Appleton, Cheshire
