= Orford, Cheshire =

Suburb of Warrington, England

Coordinates: 53.4072°N 2.5825°W

Orford
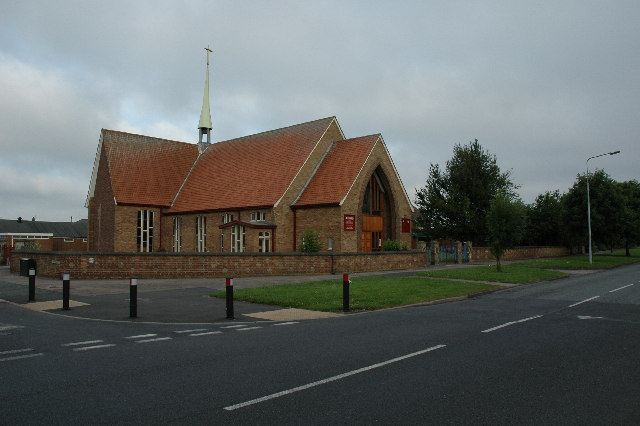
- Saint Andrew's Church

- Location within Cheshire
- Population: 10,950 (2001)
- OS grid reference: SJ609902
- Unitary authority: Warrington
- Ceremonial county: Cheshire
- Region: North West
- Country: England
- Sovereign state: United Kingdom
- Post town: Warrington
- Postcode district: WA2
- Dialling code: 01925
- Police: Cheshire
- Fire: Cheshire
- Ambulance: North West
- UK Parliament: Warrington North

Orford is a suburb of Warrington, in the Warrington district, in the ceremonial county of Cheshire, England.

Originally a small area north of the township of Warrington, it is now a large area between the town centre and the M62, incorporating other small communities, such as Longford. Orford area had a population of 10,950 at the 2001 census.

Orford Hall was demolished in the 1930s after the grounds were given to the town for Orford Park. Jubilee Park, a £30m project providing community and sporting facilities on former waste land between the park and Winwick Road, opened May 2012.

William Beamont, a Victorian solicitor and philanthropist, lived at Orford Hall, which had previously been the seat of the Blackburne family. He founded Warrington's municipal library, the first rate-aided library in England, in 1848. His diaries are a valuable source of social history. Another notable local family were the Booths, who built Orford House in the late 18th century, ancestors of Charles Booth of the Liverpool shipowning family.

There is one high school, Beamont Collegiate Academy, and several primary schools, including St Margaret's CoE Primary School, which was the primary school of former-Manchester United footballer, Jesse Lingard.

== Geography ==
The area is primarily given over to housing, most being built as council housing, though many council houses are now in private ownership. Along with the council housing, a majority of the buildings on Grasmere Avenue (a large council estate) are temporary housing. Boundaries are Greenwood Estate to the east (after which it becomes Cinnamon Brow), Winwick Road to the west (where it becomes Bewsey), the M62 to the north (where it becomes Winwick) and Marsh House Lane to the south (where it becomes Fairfield).

== Transport ==
The area is well served by bus services. The services that serve the main part of the district are the Orford circulars (services 20 and 21), services to Gorse Covert and Birchwood (services 25-27), also several services serve Winwick Road on the western edge of the district (services 19, 22, 329 and 360). With the exceptions of the 329 and 360 (operated by Arriva North West), all services are operated by Warrington's Own Buses.

The nearest railway stations are those in the town centre, (Central (for services to Manchester and Liverpool) and Bank Quay (for services via the West Coast Main Line)).

== Demographics ==
=== Population and ethnicity ===
Orford ward has a population of 11,010 residents; 49.5% are male and 50.5% are female. The average age of the population is 36.3 years. The vast majority of the population are white (98.5%); there are very small populations of mixed (0.5%), black (0.1%), and Asian (0.7%) residents.

=== Housing and poverty ===
There are 4,418 households in this ward of Warrington. 65.3% of houses are owner occupied. 27.5% are classed as council accommodation. 4.7% are rented from private landlords and 2.6% have residents who are living rent free. The average house price in this ward is £100,420. Of the 4,418 households, 6.5% are overcrowded. The population density is 53.9 residents per hectare. Based on the ACORN index, the majority of residents describe the ward as "hard-pressed". It is also the most deprived ward in Warrington borough. 10.2% of residents are on benefits.

=== Employment and education ===
Only 59.1% of economically active residents are employed. However, the unemployment rate amongst the economically active is 4.6% which is almost twice the borough's unemployment rate. 2.2% of all economically active residents are in full-time education. Those that are economically inactive (due to retirement, long-term disability/illness, or full-time carer status) account for 34.3% of the population. In terms of education, 38.5% of residents do not have any qualifications whatsoever. However the majority (45.6%) have level one (Minimum 1+ GCSEs A*-G or equivalent) or level two (Minimum 5+ GCSEs (A*-G) or 1+ A-level (A-E) or equivalent) qualifications. The remainder have level three or higher qualifications (Minimum 2+ A-levels (A-E), 4+ AS levels (A-E) or equivalent.)
