= Warrington Borough Council =

Local authority of Warrington, Cheshire, England

Type
- Type: Unitary authority

Leadership
- Mayor: Sagheer Zaman, Labour since 18 May 2026
- Leader: Hans Mundry, Labour since 4 December 2023
- Chief Executive: Sarah Smith since 2026

Structure
- Seats: 58 councillors
- Graph of the party split among 58 seats.
- Political groups: Administration (40) Labour (40) Other parties (18) Liberal Democrats (11) Conservative (2) Independent (5)

Elections
- Voting system: Plurality-at-large
- Last election: 2 May 2024
- Next election: 4 May 2028

Meeting place
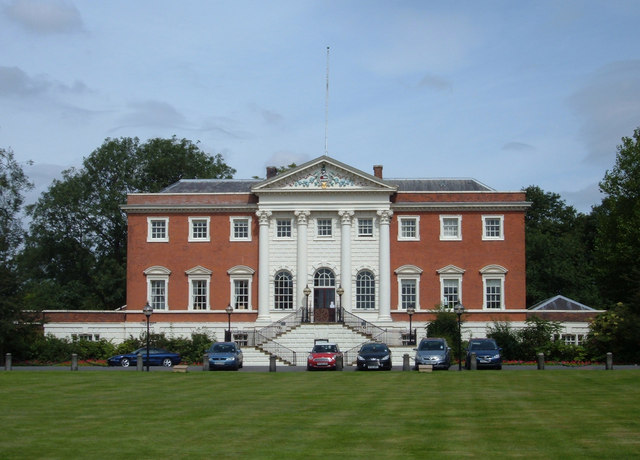
- Town Hall, Sankey Street, Warrington

Website
- www.warrington.gov.uk

Warrington Borough Council is the local authority of the Borough of Warrington, a local government district in the ceremonial county of Cheshire, England. Warrington has had a borough council since 1847, which has been reformed on several occasions. Since 1998 the council has been a unitary authority, being a district council which also performs the functions of a county council.

The council has been under Labour majority control since 2011. It meets at Warrington Town Hall and has its main offices at 1 Time Square.

In 2026, the council became part of the Cheshire and Warrington Combined Authority.

== History ==
The town of Warrington was made a municipal borough in 1847, governed by a body formally called the "mayor, aldermen and burgesses of the borough of Warrington", generally known as the corporation, town council or borough council. This first incarnation of the borough council replaced an earlier body of improvement commissioners which had governed the town since 1813. From its creation in 1847 the borough straddled Lancashire and Cheshire, with the county boundary being the River Mersey; the town centre and most of the built-up area was on the north bank of the river in Lancashire, but the borough also included the built-up parts of Latchford on the south bank of the river in Cheshire.

In 1889 boroughs which straddled county boundaries were placed entirely in the county which had the majority of the population, and so the part of the borough south of the Mersey was transferred from Cheshire to Lancashire. The borough boundaries were subsequently enlarged on several occasions, notably in 1890, 1933 and 1954.

In 1900 Warrington was made a county borough, making it independent from Lancashire County Council, whilst remaining part of Lancashire for ceremonial purposes.

The borough was substantially enlarged in 1974, taking in a number of surrounding parishes from both Lancashire and Cheshire, including Lymm, which had been a separate urban district. The enlarged borough was transferred from Lancashire to Cheshire and was redesignated as a non-metropolitan district, with Cheshire County Council providing county-level services.

The borough council regained control of county-level functions 24 years later in 1998. The way this change was implemented was by creating a new non-metropolitan county called Warrington covering the borough, but with no separate county council. Instead, the existing borough council took on county council functions, making it a unitary authority. It remains part of Cheshire for ceremonial purposes.

In February 2026, the council became part of the Cheshire and Warrington Combined Authority.

== Governance ==
As a unitary authority, Warrington Borough Council has the functions of a county council and district council combined. In its capacity as a district council it is a billing authority collecting Council Tax and business rates, it processes local planning applications, it is responsible for housing, waste collection and environmental health. In its capacity as a county council it is a local education authority, responsible for social services, libraries and waste disposal. Parts of the borough are also covered by civil parishes, which form a second tier of local government for their areas.

=== Political control ===
The council has been under Labour majority control since 2011.

Political control of the council since the 1974 reforms has been as follows:

Non-metropolitan district

Party in control	Years
Conservative	1974–1979
No overall control	1979–1983
Labour	1983–1998

Unitary authority

Party in control	Years
Labour	1998–2006
No overall control	2006–2011
Labour	2011–present

=== Leadership ===
The role of Mayor of Warrington is largely ceremonial. Political leadership is instead provided by the leader of the council. The leaders since 1985 have been:

Councillor	Party	From	To
Mike Hall	Labour	1985	1992
John Gartside	Labour	1992	2002
Mike Hughes	Labour	23 May 2002	23 Feb 2004
John Joyce	Labour	23 Feb 2004	May 2006
Ian Marks	Liberal Democrats	22 May 2006	May 2011
Terry O'Neill	Labour	23 May 2011	17 Dec 2018
Russ Bowden	Labour	17 Dec 2018	4 Dec 2023
Hans Mundry	Labour	4 Dec 2023	

The Mayors since 1998 have been:

Councillor	Party	From	To
Albert Clemow	Labour	1998	1999
Tom Swift	Labour	1999	2000
Sheila Woodyatt	Conservative	2000	2001
Jeff Richards	Labour	2001	2002
George Warburton	Labour	2002	2003
Pauline Nelson	Labour	2003	2004
Edward Lafferty	Liberal Democrats	2004	2005
Hans Mundry	Labour	2005	2006
Linda Dirir	Labour	2006	2007
Celia Jordan	Liberal Democrats	2007	2008
Graham Welborne	Liberal Democrats	2008	2009
Brian Axcell	Liberal Democrats	2009	2010
John Joyce	Labour	2010	2011
Michael Biggin	Liberal Democrats	2011	2012
Steve Wright	Labour	2012	2013
Peter Carey	Labour	2013	2014
Ted Finnegan	Liberal Democrats	2014	2015
Geoff Settle	Labour	2015	2016
Faisal Rashid	Labour	2016	2017
Les Morgan	Labour	2017	2018
Karen Mundry	Labour	2018	2019
Wendy Johnson	Liberal Democrats	2019	2020
Maureen Creaghan	Labour	2021	2022
Jean Flaherty	Labour	2022	2023
Steve Wright	Labour	2023	2024
Wendy Johnson	Liberal Democrats	2024	2025
Mo Hussain	Labour	2025	2026
Sagheer Zaman	Labour	2026	2027

The Mayor's role is to perform civic duties across the Borough, such as attending large events in different communities and taking the lead on certain recognised days, such as Remembrance Sunday. The Mayor has no power over policies, as that is the job of the Leader. The Mayor also chairs Full Council meetings. Though elected as a Councillor representing a particular Party, the Mayor remains impartial when chairing but also has a vote of their own (often voting with their Party line).

=== Composition ===
Following the 2024 election and subsequent changes of allegiance up to September 2026, the composition of the council was:

Party	Seats
Labour	40
Liberal Democrats	11
Conservative	2
Independent	5
Total	58

The next elections are due in May 2028.

== Elections ==
Since the last boundary changes in 2016 the council has comprised 58 councillors representing 22 wards, with each ward electing two or three councillors. Elections are held every four years.

== Premises ==
The council generally meets at Warrington Town Hall on Sankey Street. The building was originally built in 1750 as a large house, and was formerly called Bank Hall. It was bought by the borough council in 1870 and converted into a town hall, with its grounds becoming a public park.

The council's main offices are at 1 Time Square which was completed in 2020, replacing earlier offices at New Town House on Scotland Road which have since been demolished.

== Investments ==
Elected members have approved a number of significant commercial investments by the local authority. In September 2016, Warrington Borough Council became one of the first local councils in the UK to buy clean-tech bonds in Swindon Solar Park through its owner, specialist investment management firm Rockfire Capital.

In September 2019, the council acquired a 50% shareholding in Clydebank-based energy retailer Together Energy for £18m. In September 2020, Bristol Energy's brand and residential accounts – 155,000 meter points – were sold by Bristol City Council to Together Energy for £14 million. In August 2021, Warrington Council's total financial exposure to Together Energy was reported to be £41.2m. In October 2021, Ofgem issued a provisional order to several suppliers, including Together Energy, who had not made Renewables Obligation payments; Together Energy's obligation was over £12m. Following sharp increases in wholesale gas and electricity prices which began in autumn 2021, Together Energy Retail Ltd announced on 18 January 2022 that it was ceasing to trade.

Other loans and investments include almost £30 million paid in stages between 2017 and 2019 for a 33% stake in Redwood Bank, a "challenger bank" which has a Warrington office. In 2021 a £202m loan facility, secured against commercial property, was provided to Matt Moulding, founder of Cheshire-based e-commerce business The Hut Group.

In September 2021, the council confirmed that its borrowing had reached £1.7 billion, but that the current value of its investment assets were £2.173 billion.

In May 2024, just after the local election, it was announced by the Government that they had commissioned a "Best Value" inspection into the council's finances. In June 2024 Moody's Ratings withdrew its credit rating from the council after it failed to provide accounts signed-off by an auditor. In January 2025, S&P Global Ratings gave the council a BBB+ credit rating with a stable outlook.
