= Whittle Hall =

Housing estate in Warrington, England

Whittle Hall is a housing estate within the parish of Great Sankey in the town of Warrington, in the Warrington district, in the ceremonial county of Cheshire, England. Its more exact location is in-between the old centre of Great Sankey, the new built Chapelford, and the Omega Development Site (formerly RAF Burtonwood). The area falls under the WA5 postal code. The estate consisted originally of Whittle Hall Farm and its surrounding fields, however as part of the Warrington new town development, the last 20 years have seen the fields turned into modern houses. The estate also contains Whittle Hall Community Centre and the original farm building which are now due to be demolished for a proposed redevelopment. As the estate is part of the new town development, the people who reside there are originally from all over the UK.

== Shops ==
The estate itself contains no retail outlets. The area surrounding Sankey Station (10 minutes walk) hosts two pubs, two convenience stores, a hairdresser, a take away offering English, Chinese and pizzas, a cafe, an independent sandwich shop and a beauty salon. An Asda superstore is located 5 minutes drive or 45 minutes walk away at Westbrook. A Lidl, McDonald's and Costa were built in 2023 just a 5-minute walk away. And Chapelford, the estate next to Whittle Hall, has a Sainsbury's, a salon, and a Chinese takeaway. Gemini Retail Park (10 minutes drive) hosts a large Marks & Spencer, the UK's first IKEA, and another McDonald's outlet. High Street shopping is available in the town centre at the Golden Square Shopping Mall.

== Governance ==
The area has three councillors in the Warrington Borough Council and five councillors representing the area on Great Sankey Parish Council. The area falls under the Warrington South constituency for which Sarah Hall is the current Member of Parliament (Labour Party).

== Transport ==
Bus: Warrington's Own Buses provides buses, with direct services to the town centre (20 minutes) and the Westbrook Centre (10 mins).

Train:: Warrington West Station (10 minutes walk) offers hourly services to Warrington Central, Manchester Oxford Road and Liverpool Lime Street, for the West Coast Main Line passengers must get the bus to Warrington Bank Quay (15 mins). Sankey for Penketh Station (10 minute walk) offers fewer train times.

Air:: The nearest airports to Whittle Hall are Liverpool John Lennon Airport (8 miles) and Manchester Airport (15 miles)

Road: Kingsdale Road runs through the estate but actually contains no houses, houses are found on connected dead end roads/cul-de-sacs. Whittle Hall is connected to the outside world through Whittle Hall Avenue and Lingley Green Avenue. The estate is located just 1 mile from the M62 Junction 8, making the houses popular homes for people working in Manchester and Liverpool (each 45 minutes). Travel to Warrington town centre is achieved via Whittle Hall Avenue and Liverpool Road (A57 road) the journey is 3 miles and takes from 10 minutes.

== Education ==
Whittle Hall forms part of the catchment area for Great Sankey High School which also contains sixth form facilities under the name Barrow Hall College. Penketh High School is as close to the estate but because its catchment area does not cover Whittle Hall few children from the estate attend.

== Sports and leisure ==
Whittle Hall has no professional sports teams, Warrington Wolves RLFC is the closest major sports team. As for the Premier League Wigan Athletic is the closest by distance, however Everton F.C. Liverpool F.C., and Manchester United are the most commonly supported clubs. Sankey Leisure centre is located next to Great Sankey High School. It is only a 2-minute drive and offers an indoor swimming pool, tennis courts and an astroturf football pitch. There is a David Lloyd gym located 5 minutes drive on the A57.

== Landmarks and culture ==
Whittle Hall's most known place is the duck pond located where the estate meets Lingley Avenue. This area contains the community centre, football fields a playground and was formerly part of "Site 2" airmen's living area on the giant RAF Burtonwood. Although just outside Whittle Hall the 'Thatched Cottage' is very well known. This newly built white cottage is very recognisable against the backdrop of red brick houses. The estate is bordered on one side by the linear park which contains a stream, open areas and separates the estate from the older parts of Great Sankey. The park is the main route used for school children who walk to the schools located on Barrow Hall Lane as well as being extremely popular with dog walkers.
