= Great Sankey =

Civil parish in Cheshire, England

Coordinates: 53.3918°N 2.6383°W

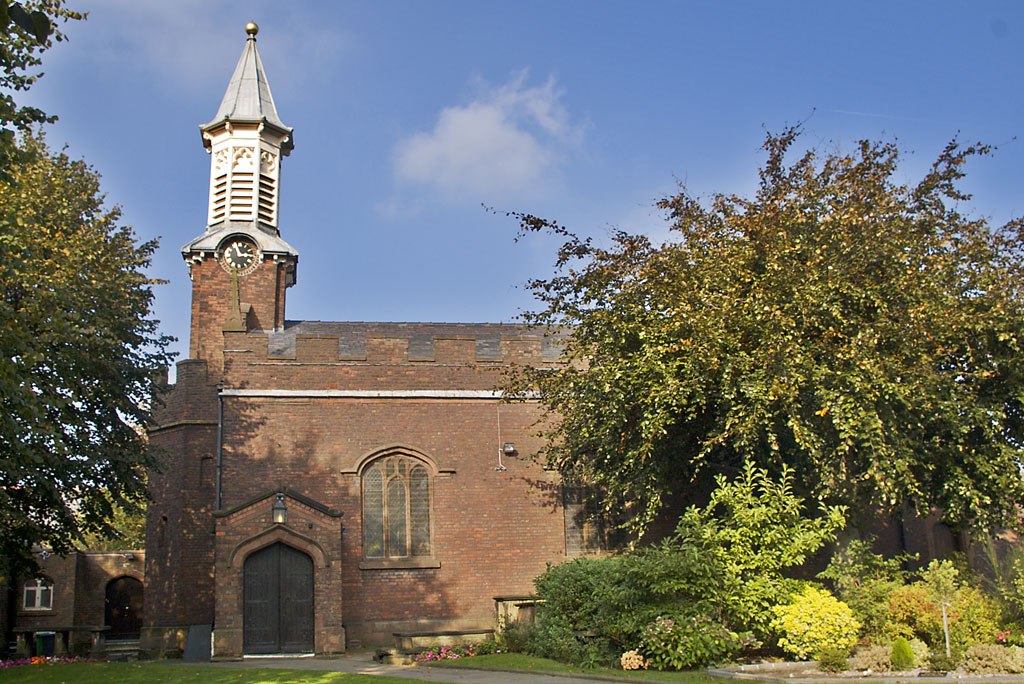
- St Mary's Church

- Location within Cheshire
- Population: 31,600
- OS grid reference: SJ575885
- Civil parish: Great Sankey
- Unitary authority: Warrington
- Ceremonial county: Cheshire
- Region: North West
- Country: England
- Sovereign state: United Kingdom
- Post town: Warrington
- Postcode district: WA5
- Dialling code: 01925
- Police: Cheshire
- Fire: Cheshire
- Ambulance: North West
- UK Parliament: Warrington South

Great Sankey is a civil parish in the Borough of Warrington in Cheshire, England. It is 2 miles (3.2 km) west of Warrington town centre and has a population of 31,600 according to the 2021 census.

== History ==
The township of Great Sankey was originally a chapelry in Prescot parish in Lancashire. It became formally a separate civil parish in 1866, and it was transferred to Cheshire in 1974. There was industrial growth along the banks of the Sankey Canal at Sankey Bridges during the 19th century but otherwise the area was rural. In the 20th century the area became largely a residential area. RAF Burtonwood was built on the outskirts in 1939, and the land is now transformed into Chapelford Urban Village and the Omega Development Site.

== Governance ==
Great Sankey forms part of Warrington South constituency of the United Kingdom Parliament. It has three council wards for the election of councillors to Warrington Borough Council: Great Sankey South, Great Sankey North and Whittle Hall, and Chapelford and Old Hall. All are represented by Labour councillors.

The civil parish is governed by a parish council consisting of fifteen elected members.

== Religion ==
The Parish Church of the Church of England is in the Diocese of Liverpool and dedicated to St. Mary. The nearest Roman Catholic church is in Penketh (St. Joseph's). Similarly, the nearest Methodist Church is also in Penketh.

== Demographics ==
Data are based on official 2001 census figures, and also on those of Great Sankey North and Great Sankey South wards.

=== Population and ethnicity ===
The district of Great Sankey has a total population of 16,960 residents, of which 49.5% are male and 50.5% are female. The average age of the population at the 2001 census was 24.3 years. Of the 16,960 residents, 98.05% describe their racial origin as white. Other major majorities are mixed (0.55%), black (0.15%) and Asian origin (0.75%). Other race accounts for 0.50%.

=== Housing and social situation ===
At the last count (2001), there were 6,381 households in Great Sankey, of which 87.10% are owner occupied, 9.55% are social accommodation, 2.70% are rented from private landlords and 0.70% have residents who live rent free. The average house price is £136,409. Of the 6,381 houses, 2.80% are classed as overcrowded. The population density is 43.75 residents per hectare. The majority of residents describe Sankey as a "comfortably well-off" area. On the Index of Multiple Deprivation, Great Sankey was described as one of the most affluent areas of Warrington.

=== Affluence ===
Great Sankey is one of the more affluent parts of Warrington north of the River Mersey. Its key position near the M62 motorway links, and being in between the cities of Liverpool and Manchester, make it a popular place to live. Relatively unaffected by the 2008 financial bank crisis, unlike other parts of Warrington, the area has continued to see the development of Chapelford Urban Village, with new restaurants and shopping facilities nearby. Developments on the north-western section of the former Burtonwood Airbase, known as Omega, also continue, although most of that is not in the parish.

=== Employment and education ===
66.20% of all resident in the Great Sankey wards are employed while unemployment stands at 2.25%. Of the population 2.50% of residents are students in full-time education. 26.44% of residents are economically inactive (due to retirement, disability or acting as a full-time carer). In terms of education, 24.05% of residents have no qualifications whatsoever (mainly down to dropping out of school early or failing end of school examinations). 49.70% of residents only have level one or two qualifications (at least 1 GCSE pass (A*-G) or equivalent), and 18.25% have at least level three qualifications (at least 2 A-levels (A-E) or 4 AS levels (A-E) or equivalent).

== Education ==
The secondary school is Great Sankey High School. This site also contains facilities for its sixth form under the name of Barrow Hall College. Nine primary schools (Barrow Hall, St Philips, Park Road, Old Hall, St Joseph's, Chapelford Village, St James, Callands and Burtonwood) serve Great Sankey.

Sycamore Lane Primary School closed in early 2013, with staff and pupils relocating to Chapelford Village Primary School.

== Transport ==
Sankey railway station is on the Liverpool to Manchester line and had an hourly service of stopping trains run by Northern. That was reduced to four services a day from the opening of Warrington West railway station (in Chapelford) on 16 December 2019, where Northern Rail provide two trains per hour, supplemented by peak hour TransPennine Express services between Liverpool and Cleethorpes. Bus services link the area with Warrington Town Centre. Great Sankey is on the A57 road linking Warrington with the M62 motorway at junction 7. The nearest airport is Liverpool John Lennon Airport.

== Notable residents ==
- Shafilea Ahmed, (1986–2003), honour killing victim

== See also ==
- Listed buildings in Great Sankey
