= Listed buildings in Great Sankey =

Great Sankey is a civil parish in the Borough of Warrington in Cheshire, England, and is a suburb to the west of the town of Warrington. It contains seven buildings that are recorded in the National Heritage List for England as designated listed buildings, all of which are at Grade II. This is the lowest of the three gradings given to listed buildings, applied to "buildings of national importance and special interest". The parish is almost completely residential. The listed buildings consist of a church and a sundial in its churchyard, a railway station, a mounting block, a former pillbox, and two milestones.

Name and location	Photograph	Date	Notes
Sundial; 53.39104°N 2.64961°W	—	1721	The sundial stands in the churchyard of St Mary's church, to the southeast of the porch. It consists of a copper dial and gnomon set on a circular concrete baluster that dates probably from the 19th century. The dial and gnomon are now missing. This stands on a hexagonal stone memorial base.
St Mary's Church; 53.3912°N 2.6497°W		1767–69	The original part of the church is the body with its polygonal west end. The west turret was added in 1868–69, and the chancel and porch, by William Owen, were built in 1883. The turret has a clock face on each side, an octagonal timber bell stage, and a lead-covered spire with a ball finial. The church is constructed in brick on a sandstone plinth, with stone dressings and a slate roof. The sides of the nave are battlemented.
Milestone; 53.38687°N 2.63895°W	—	Early to mid-19th century	A whitewashed triangular stone milestone on the south side of Liverpool Road, with a flat top. It has an Ordnance Survey benchmark on the top, and is inscribed with the distances in miles to Prescot, Liverpool and Warrington.
Milestone; 53.39412°N 2.67270°W	—	Mid-19th century (probable)	A triangular stone milestone on the south side of the A57 road, with a flat top and a rounded front corner. It has an Ordnance Survey benchmark on the top, and is inscribed with the distances in miles to Prescot, Liverpool and Warrington.
Sankey railway station 53.3922°N 2.6505°W		c.1870	Built for the Cheshire Lines Committee, the station is constructed in brick with slate roofs. It is in one storey with a cross wing at each end; the west wing (originally the stationmaster's house) has two storeys, and the east wing has a single storey. A three-bay canopy carried on octagonal cast iron columns stretches between the cross wings.
Mounting block 53.39280°N 2.66415°W	—	Mid- to late 19th century	The mounting block is a sandstone monolith with two steps at each end. It has an inscription on its north face.
Pickett-Hamilton Fort; 53.40723°N 2.65145°W	—	c. 1940	A surviving pillbox on the site of the former RAF Burtonwood base. It is a defensive structure in concrete and steel, and has a circular plan. The pillbox consists of two circular concrete cylinders, the inner one higher and containing three rectangular loopholes, and on the lid is a manhole with a steel cover. Some of the internal mechanism is still present.

== See also ==
- Listed buildings in Bold, St Helens
- Listed buildings in Burtonwood and Westbrook
- Listed buildings in Penketh
- Listed buildings in Warrington (unparished area)
