= Gassan Solomon =

South African politician and imam (1941–2009)

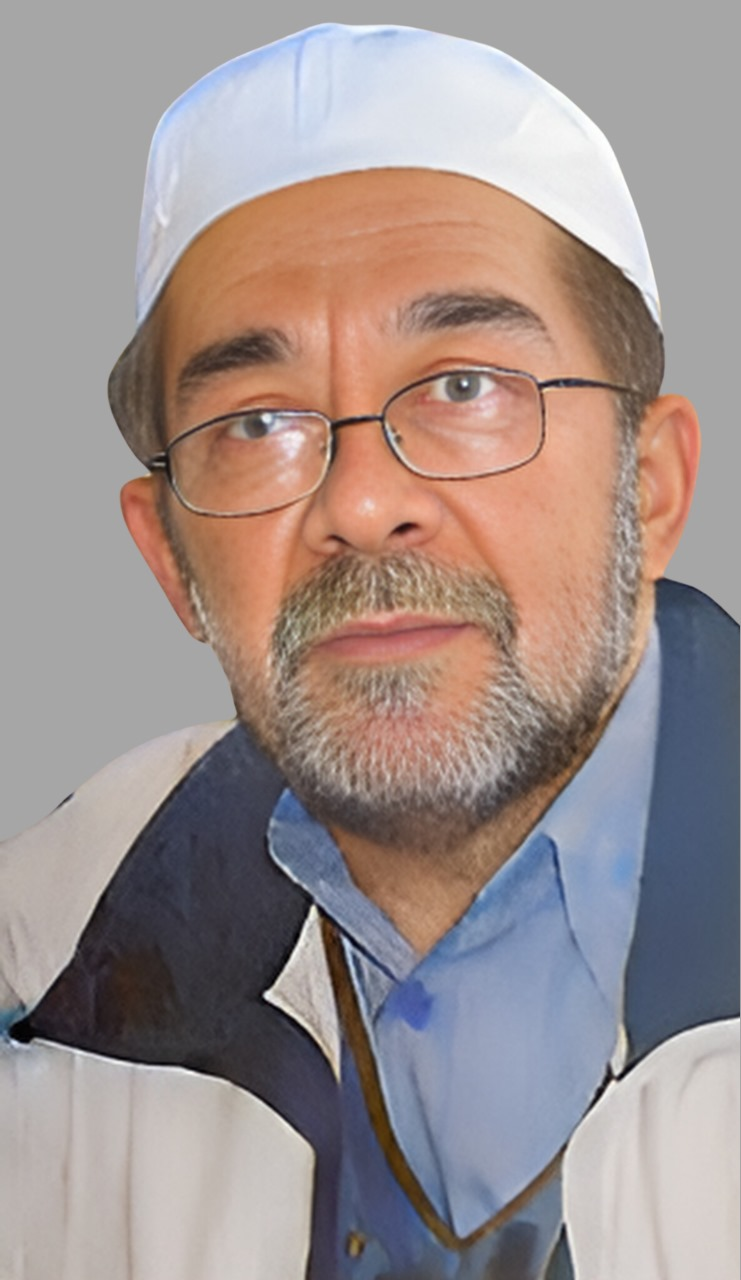

Member of the National Assembly
- In office 1994 – May 2009

Personal details
- Born: 6 January 1941 Constantia, Cape Town; Cape Province, Union of South Africa
- Died: 28 October 2009 (aged 68)
- Party: African National Congress
- Education: University of Cape Town

Gassan Solomon (6 January 1941 – 28 October 2009) was a South African politician and Muslim religious leader in Cape Town. He represented the African National Congress (ANC) in the National Assembly from 1994 to 2009.

During apartheid, as the Imam of Cape Town's Claremont Mosque from 1979, Solomon was active in the United Democratic Front and broader anti-apartheid movement. He was also a national leader of the Muslim Judicial Council and Call of Islam.

== Early life and activism ==
Solomon was born on 6 January 1941 in Constantia in Cape Town in the Cape Province. His mother was the great-granddaughter of Imam Abdullah Kadi Abdus Salaam, known in South Africa as Tuan Guru and a renowned figure in the history of political Islam in the Cape. He matriculated from South Peninsula High and completed a bachelor's degree in social science at the University of Cape Town.

He joined the African National Congress (ANC) in 1960, though he was also influenced by the Pan Africanist Congress. While he was a student, his family was forcibly removed from their home in Constantia in terms of the apartheid-era Group Areas Act. That experience, as well as the death of Imam Abdullah Haron in detention in 1969, politicised Solomon further; he was a founding member of the Muslim Students Association.

In 1979, he became Imam at the popular mosque on Claremont Main Road in Cape Town. He was active in anti-apartheid community organising in the area, as well as in the inter-faith solidarity movement, leading political marches with the Reverend Allan Boesak. He was a member of the Muslim Judicial Council (MJC) and joined the United Democratic Front (UDF) when it was founded in 1983. Indeed, when the MJC disaffiliated from the UDF in 1984, Solomon became a founding member of the Call of Islam, an alternative body which affiliated to the UDF. Later, testifying before the Truth and Reconciliation Commission in 1997, Solomon defended the MJC as an early and staunch opponent of apartheid, but said that the MJC should have done more to ameliorate polarisation between conservative and progressive Muslims.

From 1985 to 1991, Solomon lived in exile abroad in Saudi Arabia; he left South Africa to avoid undue police attention, particularly after he defied a government ban to attend the funeral of Gugulethu youth activist Sithembele Mathiso in August 1985. Upon his return, he helped the ANC re-establish legal structures in South Africa during the democratic transition, and he accompanied Nelson Mandela on a visit to Saudi Arabia and Iran in 1992. He also began preparations to launch the Voice of the Cape radio station.

== Parliament: 1994–2009 ==
After the end of apartheid in 1994, Solomon became a member of the new National Assembly; he was not immediately elected in the April 1994 general election, but was sworn in later in 1994 to fill a casual vacancy in the ANC caucus. He served three terms in his seat, gaining re-election in 1999 and 2004. He ran the ANC's constituency office in Grassy Park, Cape Town.

== Personal life and death ==
Solomon was divorced from Nazly Solomon and married to Amina Solomon. He had two sons and two daughters. He died on 28 October 2009 after being diagnosed with prostate cancer.
