= Quds Day demonstrations =

Protest of annual pro-Palestinian day

This article contains a list of Quds Day demonstrations around world.

== 1980s ==
On Quds Day 1985, amid the "war of the cities" of the Iran–Iraq War, Iraqi bombers and long-range missiles struck 14 cities, reportedly killing at least 78 people and wounding 326. According to the Islamic Republic News Agency, the sound of the exploding bombs and missiles in Tehran was drowned out by the crowds chanting "War, war until victory 3/8."

On Quds Day 1987, held shortly after the outbreak of the First Intifada, effigies of U.S. President Ronald Reagan and Israeli leaders were burned in Iran "as a sign of Moslem nations' revolutionary wrath against Zionism, imperialism and apartheid." In Tehran, President Ali Khamenei said the Palestinians "should resist and fight Zionism. This is the message of the whole Iranian people who chant the 'Death to Israel' slogan."

On Quds Day 1989, Iranian parliament speaker Hashemi Rafsanjani said that Palestinians should kill Americans and other Westerners in retaliation for attacks by the Israeli military in the occupied territories: "If in retaliation for every Palestinian martyred in Palestine they will kill and execute, not inside Palestine, five Americans or Britons or Frenchmen, they (Israelis) could not continue these wrongs. It is not hard to kill Americans or Frenchman. It is a bit difficult to kill (Israelis). But there are so many (Americans and Frenchman) everywhere in the world."

== 1990s ==
Fearing an Israeli military strike, Hezbollah cancelled its annual Quds Day rallies in 1992 for the first time in the group's history. 10 days earlier, a suicide bombing in Buenos Aires, Argentina destroyed the Israeli embassy there and killed 29 people injured 242 others. Hezbollah was implicated in the attack.

In 1994, Iranian President Hashemi Rafsanjani told demonstrators, "Can Israel really remain? In my opinion it cannot. That artificial entity cannot survive."

In 1998, former Iranian president Hashemi Rafsanjani stated that Israel's crimes against the Palestinians exceeded those of Adolf Hitler against the Jews. He added, "The Zionist regime is a fake government and homeland which is shaped with millions of homeless Palestinians and hundreds of thousands of Muslim martyrs... I'm sure that in the future we will have Islamic Palestine. I'm sure nothing will remain as the territory of Israel."

In 1999, a reported three million people attended Quds Day rallies in Iran. In Tehran, a resolution was read aloud calling for struggle "until the aggressor Zionist regime is annihilated." Iranian Parliament Speaker Ali Akbar Nateq-Nouri told worshipers at Friday prayers, "There is no country named Israel. There is Palestine, and the thieves who have occupied the houses of Palestinians should be removed from those houses." In Beirut, Hezbollah leader Hassan Nasrallah told thousands of supporters, "On Al-Quds Day, I reaffirm to you that Israel will be eliminated one day, God willing." At the Yarmouk Palestinian refugee camp in Syria, protesters carried a banner that read "America is the enemy of God."

== 2000–2008 ==
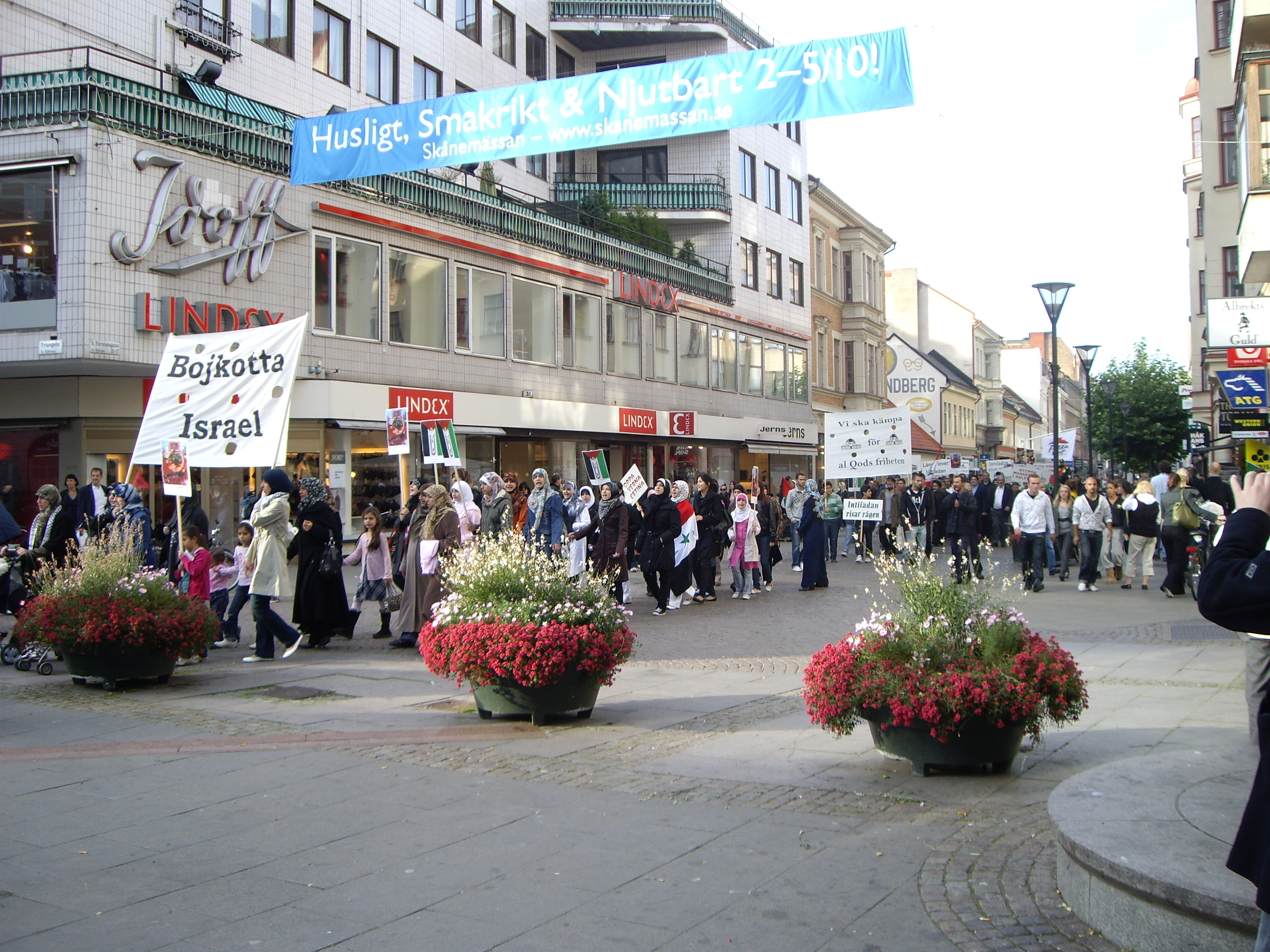
March in Malmö, Sweden; Al-Quds Day 2008

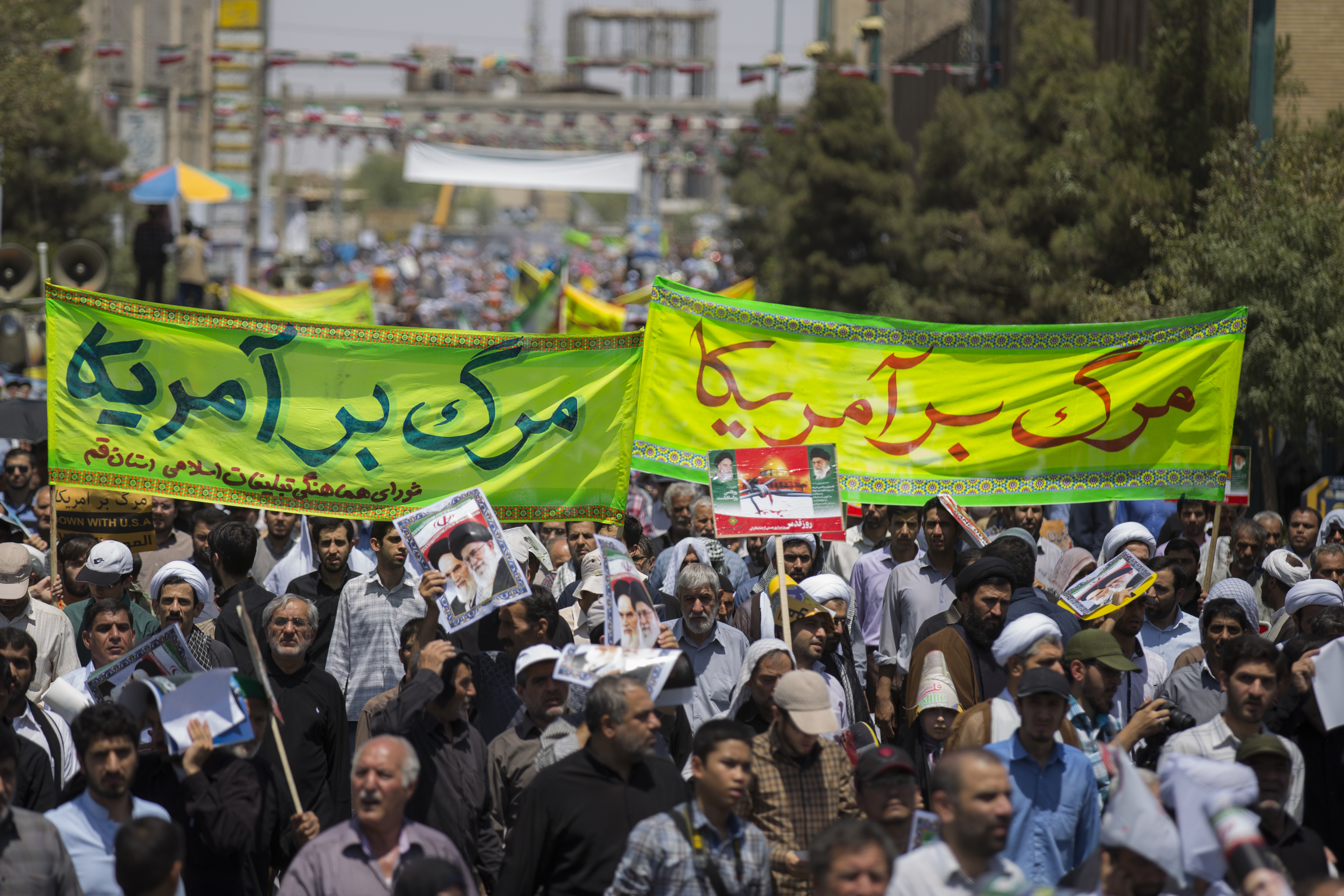
Quds Day marchers in Qom, Iran

Over one million people, with over 100,000 in each of Iran's eight largest cities, marched in the 2005 Quds Day protests in Tehran and other cities across Iran. Protests were staged throughout the Middle East and the wider Arab World, with over 30,000 Bahrainis marching in Manama, and 6,000 Hezbollah volunteers marching in Beirut.

In 2006, Iranian President Mahmoud Ahmadinejad threatened any country that supports Israel, and said the U.S. and its allies had "imposed a group of terrorists" on the region with their support of the Jewish state. He added that Israel no longer had any reason to exist and would soon disappear: "This regime, thanks to God, has lost the reason for its existence. Efforts to stabilize this fake (Israeli) regime, by the grace of God, have completely failed... You should believe that this regime is disappearing."

That year, Hezbollah did not organize a mass rally for Quds Day, stating it was unnecessary because it had recently held a demonstration on September 22 to celebrate what it declared to be its "victory" over Israel in that summer's conflict. In the place of a mass event, the day was commemorated with an "invitation-only event in a concert hall [which] featured an orchestra, a choir and several anti-Israel speeches."

The 2007 Quds Day protest saw millions of Iranians march in support of the Palestinians. During the rallies in Tehran, President Ahmadinejad said that the "creation, continued existence and unlimited (Western) support for this [Zionist] regime is an insult to human dignity." The protests also featured signs denouncing the U.S. government for its support of Israel. Over 3,000 people marched in Damascus carrying Palestinian flags. Hezbollah organized marches in the city's Yarmouk refugee camp.

== 2009 Quds Day ==
Supporters of Iranian opposition groups used the 2009 Quds Day to stage protests against President Ahmadinejad and the Iranian government in response to the disputed 2009 Iranian presidential election. Estimates put the opposition protest in the tens of thousands, with participants shouting slogans in support of former prime minister Mir-Hossein Mousavi, the candidate who received the most votes in the presidential elections. Rejecting the government's support of Palestinian militancy, opposition protesters chanted, "No to Gaza and Lebanon, I will give my life for Iran." There were reports of similar protests in Isfahan, Tabriz, Yazd and Shiraz.

Iranian state TV played down the unrest. Independent sources estimated "tens of thousands" to over 100,000 in Tehran, many of them bused in by the government. At least ten anti-government protesters were arrested during the demonstrations. An angry crowd of Ahmadinejad supporters attacked Mousavi's car while shouting "Death to the hypocrite Mousavi." In other cities Basiji militiamen attacked protesters.

As he has done on previous such occasions, Mahmoud Ahmadinejad provoked intense criticism and condemnation from Western governments in particular. He stated, "The pretext (Holocaust) for the creation of the Zionist regime (Israel) is false ... It is a lie based on an unprovable and mythical claim." His statements drew immediate condemnation from the governments of the United States, Russia, and the European Union.

In Lebanon, Hassan Nasrallah, the leader of Hezbollah, used the occasion to call for popular resistance to replace the regimes in the Middle East with regimes that are 'convinced of war in order to send their armies to war.'

== 2010 Quds Day ==
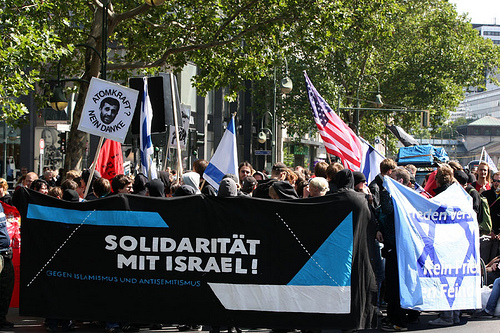
Demonstration against Al Quds Day 2010 in Berlin.

At the 2010 Quds Day rally in Tehran, Iranian President Ahmadinejad again predicted the demise of Israel, stating, "If the leaders of the region do not have the guts, then the people of the region are capable of removing the Zionist regime from the world scene." He dismissed any Israeli military threat to Iran's nuclear program, declaring, "The Zionist regime is nothing and even its (Western) masters are too small to conduct any kind of aggression against Iran and the rights of the Iranian people." Ahmadinejad also proclaimed new peace talks between Israelis and Palestinians as "stillborn and doomed." The tens of thousands of Iranians participating in the rallies continued the regular chants of "Death to America! Death to Israel!" The day before the rallies, Ayatollah Khamenei tweeted, "Israel Is A Hideous Entity In the Middle East Which Will Undoubtedly Be Annihilated."

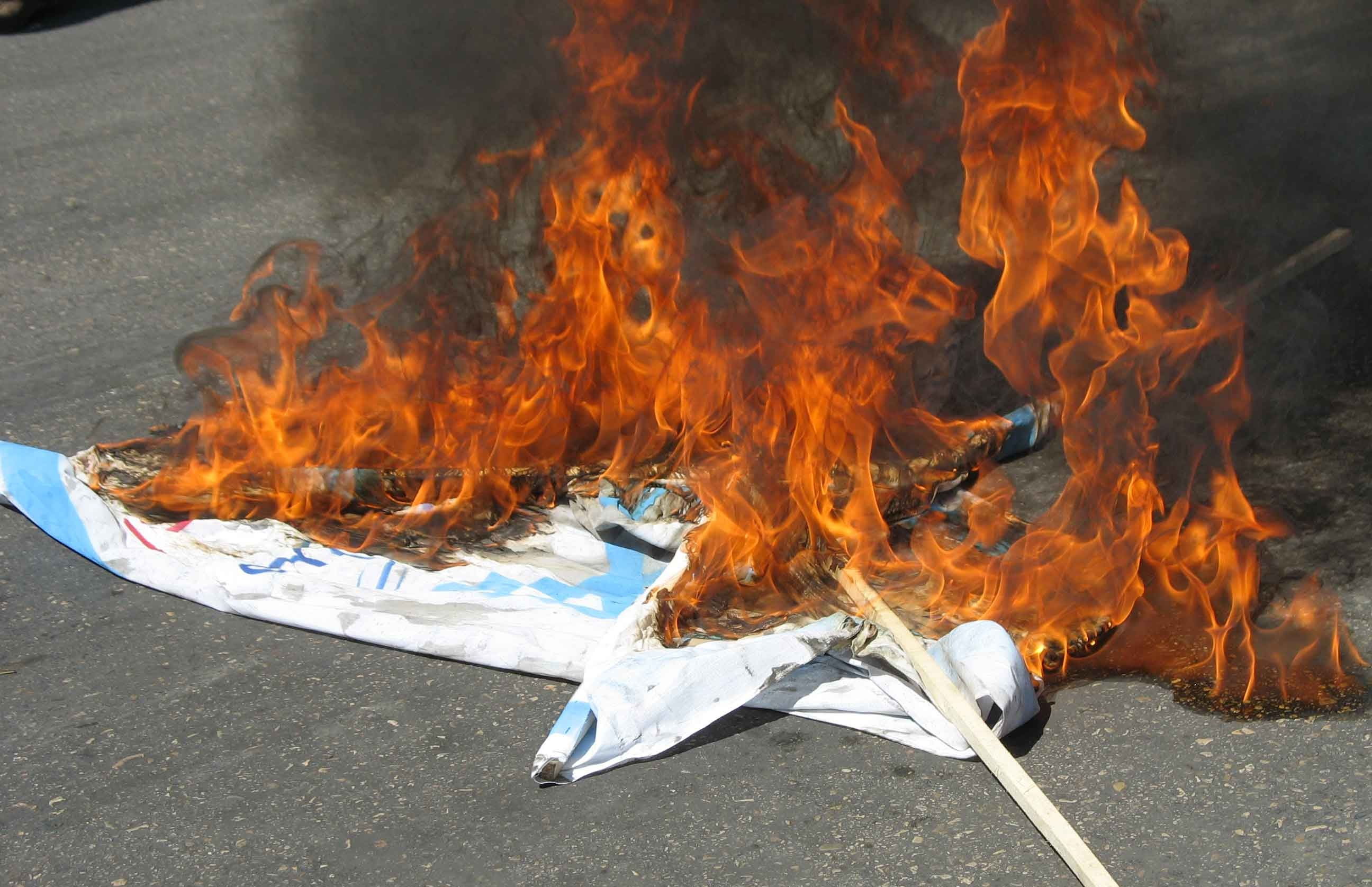
Israeli flags being burnt at the 2011 Quds Day demonstration in Nishapur, northeastern Iran.

In Lebanon, the day after the resumption of direct peace negotiations between Israel and Palestine, Hassan Nasrallah, Hezbollah secretary-general, declared that:

Our nation cannot ignore and forget this cause (al-Quds) because it is part of our religion, our religious commitment, our culture, our civilization, our morals and values and our past history. ... No one has the right to give up one span of its land, one grain of its sacred sand, one drop of its water, or one letter of its name. Al Quds Day is the day for announcing this ideological, legal, historic true constant position. On this day we make the announcement that neither al-Quds nor even one of its streets nor even a neighbourhood of its neighbourhoods – and not only all of al-Quds -may be an eternal capital for the so-called state of Israel. Al Quds is the capital of Palestine, and as we have said in the past, it is the capital of earth and the capital of heaven one way or another.'

In Quetta, Pakistan, a suicide bomber attacked Pakistani Shias holding a Quds Day rally. The Pakistani Taliban claimed responsibility for the attack, which killed at least 65 people and wounded 160.

== 2012 Quds Day ==
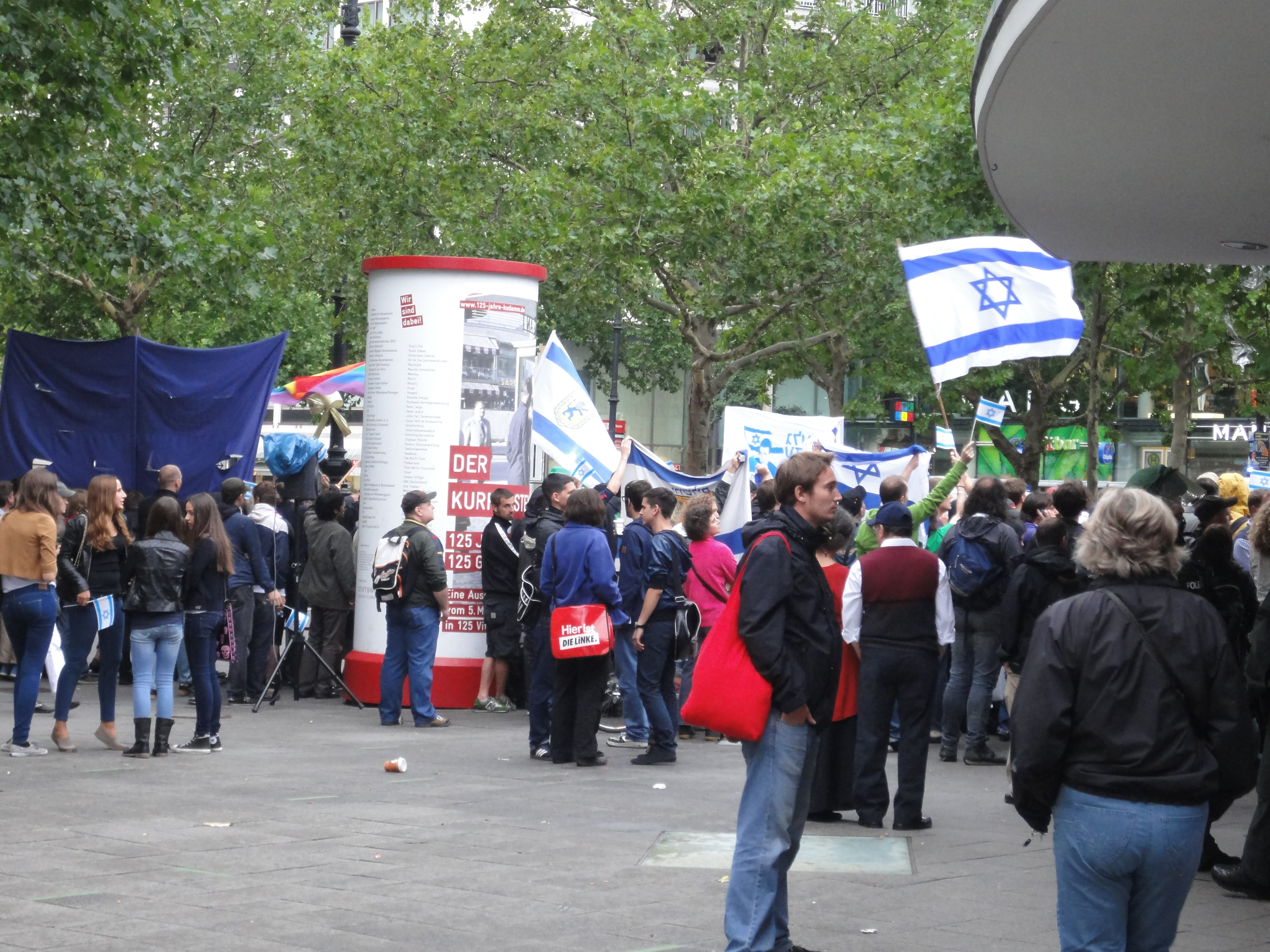
Protesters against the 2011 Quds Day demonstrations in Berlin.

On August 17, 2012, millions of Iranians commemorated al-Quds Day, where they waved Palestinian flags, chanted "Death to Israel and America," and burned Israeli and American flags. Iranian President Mahmoud Ahmadinejad called to destroy Israel, which he termed an "insult to all humanity" and called to remove the "Zionist black stain." Ahmadinejad said that "the Zionist regime is a tool to dominate the Middle East," as well as that world powers are “thirsty for Iranian blood." Ahmadinejad stated that "The Zionist regime and the Zionists are a cancerous tumour. Even if one cell of them is left in one inch of (Palestinian) land, in the future this story (of Israel's existence) will repeat." He further stated that "The nations of the region will soon finish off the usurper Zionists in the Palestinian land. ... A new Middle East will definitely be formed. With the grace of God and help of the nations, in the new Middle East there will be no trace of the Americans and Zionist."

In Lebanon, Hezbollah leader Hassan Nasrallah stated in a televised speech that, in the eventuality of a future Israeli attack on Lebanon, only a few rockets fired by the group's militia could cause massive casualties, given its well-planned target list, explaining that:

"Rockets are ready and directed at these targets. We will not hesitate to use them, if we have to, at any point in time in the course of aggression against our country to protect our people. ... Hezbollah cannot destroy Israel but we can transform the lives of millions of Zionists in occupied Palestine into a real hell. We can change the face of Israel."

Hundreds of people turned out in Gaza to protest the Israeli occupation of Jerusalem. A spokesman for the Popular Front for the Liberation of Palestine said "We are committed to the right of return and to liberation of prisoners and resistance against the occupation as long as it is on our land". In Bahrain, dozens took part in the protests, which were dispersed by security forces' tear gas.

Labour Party politician Jeremy Corbyn attended the London rally, which was supported by the Stop the War Coalition. He was photographed coincidentally standing near Hezbollah flags, for which he was criticised on social media.

== 2013 Quds Day ==
On August 2, 2013, Quds rallies were held in "the United Kingdom, Australia, Iran, the United States, and across the Muslim world". While Iranians were commemorating al-Quds Day, Iranian Students News Agency (ISNA) reported that newly elected President Hassan Rouhani said "the Zionist regime is a wound that has sat on the body of the Muslim world for years and needs to be removed," although ISNA later retracted the statement. Israeli Prime Minister Benjamin Netanyahu responded by saying "Rouhani's true face has been exposed earlier than expected," and warned that despite the election of the so-called moderate, "the objective of the regime – to acquire nuclear weapons to threaten Israel, the Middle East and peace and security throughout the world – has not changed."

Outgoing Iranian President Ahmadinejad addressed Al-Quds day crowds, warning of an impending regional storm that would uproot Israel. He also said that Israel "has no place in the region."

=== Canada ===
In Toronto, Canada, a crowd of approximately 400 held an Al-Quds Day rally. One of the speakers, Elias Hazineh, a Christian, reportedly elicited cheers from the crowd when he declared an ultimatum to Israelis: “You have to leave Jerusalem. You have to leave Palestine. When somebody tries to rob a bank the police get in, they don't negotiate and we have been negotiating with them for 65 years. We say get out or you are dead! We give them two minutes and then we start shooting. And that’s the only way that they will understand." Hazineh then concluded his speech by quoting from the Quran: "And prepare against them whatever you are able of power and steeds of war – that's the only thing that they'll understand!" A video of the event, including Hazineh's speech, was later posted online. Those remarks drew swift condemnation.

== 2014 Quds Day ==
On July 25, 2014, Iran's Press TV claimed that millions of people from around the world rallied in a show of support for Palestinians. This year's rallies were held with a higher turnout as Israel and Hamas began renewed armed conflict on July 8 in Gaza.

=== Germany ===
Quds Day 2014 in Berlin

More than a thousand people gathered at Adenauerplatz in Berlin for a demonstration against "zionists" calling for a free Palestine while thousands of police were on alert to avoid possible conflicts between protesters and pro-Israeli groups on Quds Day. Approximately 700 pro-Israel marchers also held a rally according to the German police. Jurgen Grassmann, the chief organizer of Berlin's Al-Quds Day March asked the demonstrators not to shout "Allahu Akbar". He reminded them the fact that they had gathered against Zionism and not Judaism, advising the protestors to “Keep Allah in your heart, but don't say so out loud."

=== Iran ===
Hundreds of thousands of Iranians in the capital Tehran and more than 770 other towns and cities throughout the country on international Quds day took part in massive rallies to express their support for the Palestinian resistance against Israel. The event took on added significance this year given the ongoing Israel and Hamas conflict in Gaza.

=== Nigeria ===
In Nigeria, the 2014 Quds day procession took place in 24 major cities, mostly in the north of the country. The processions were organized by Nigerian Islamic Movement. The processions were all conducted peacefully except in Zaria, the abode of the leader of the movement, Ibrahim Zakzaky; where the Nigerian Army reportedly opened fire on the participants and killed 35 people, including three (3) biological sons of the head of the movement.

=== Pakistan ===
Thousands of people in many cities across Pakistan marched in support of Palestine. The Jamaat-e-Islami political party organized rallies in several cities. Popular Shia cleric Syed Jawad Naqvi orchestrated a separate rally in the city of Lahore.

=== South Africa ===
Almost 5,000 pro-Palestinian rallied in the streets of Cape Town, to express their support for the people of Palestine. The rally commenced from Keizersgracht Street in District Six towards the Parliament. The protestors delivered a memorandum calling the government to take solid measures against the occupation of Palestine to the Parliament. According to the Voice of the Cape, it called for the expulsion of the Israeli ambassador and also urged the protesters to boycott local stores which stock products manufactured in the occupied territories of Palestine.

=== Syria ===
International al-Quds rally took place in Damascus, starting from he entrance of al-Hamidiyeh market towards the Umayyad Mosque. Popular figures and representatives of Palestinian and Syrian forces accompanied the rally. The demonstrators claimed to support the resistance until Palestinian freedom is achieved.

=== United Kingdom ===
Thousands of British demonstrators took part in a march in central London, ending with a rally outside the US embassy against US–Israel arms deals.

== 2015 Quds day ==
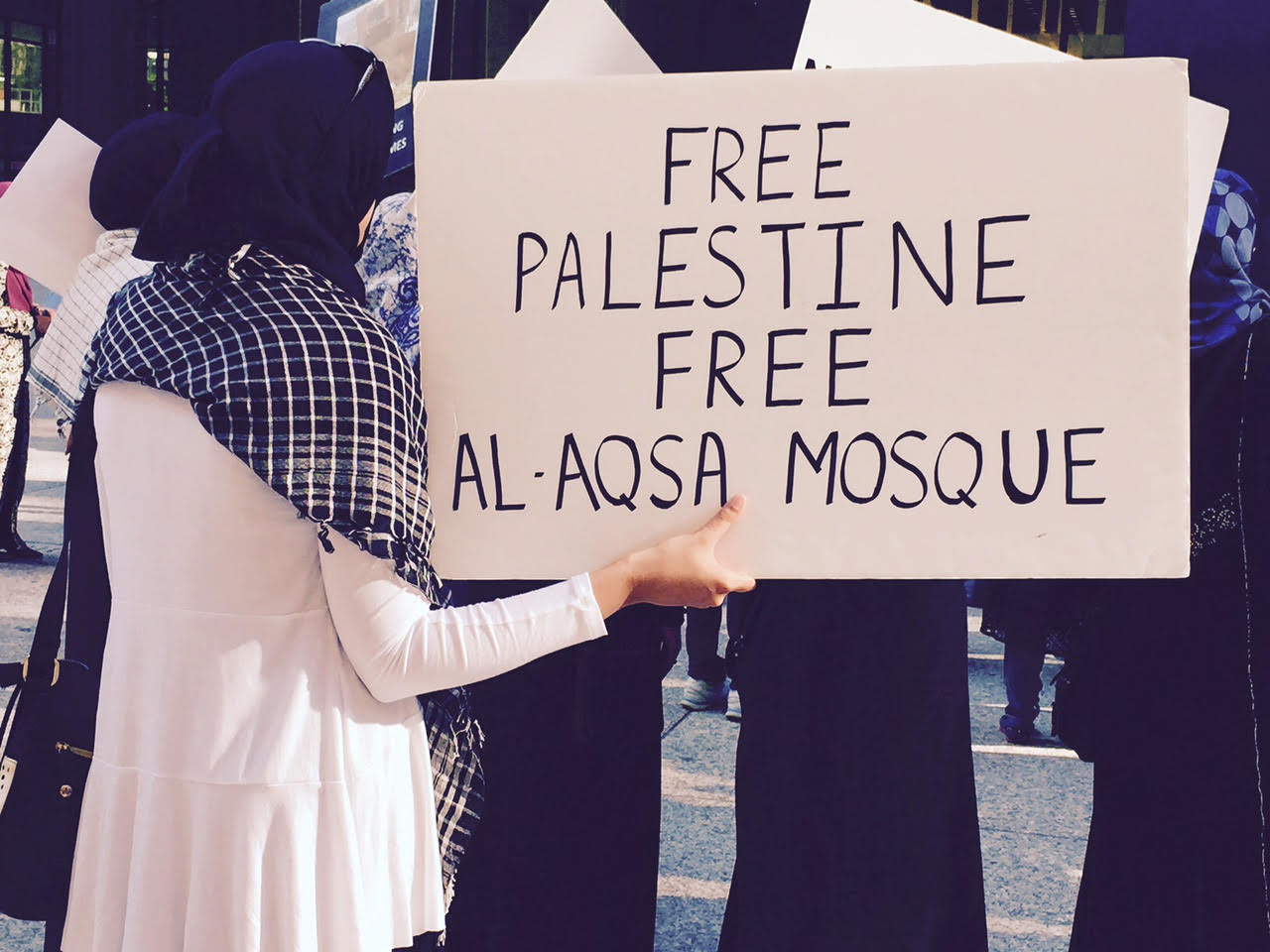
A woman participating 2015 Quds day rally, Chicago.

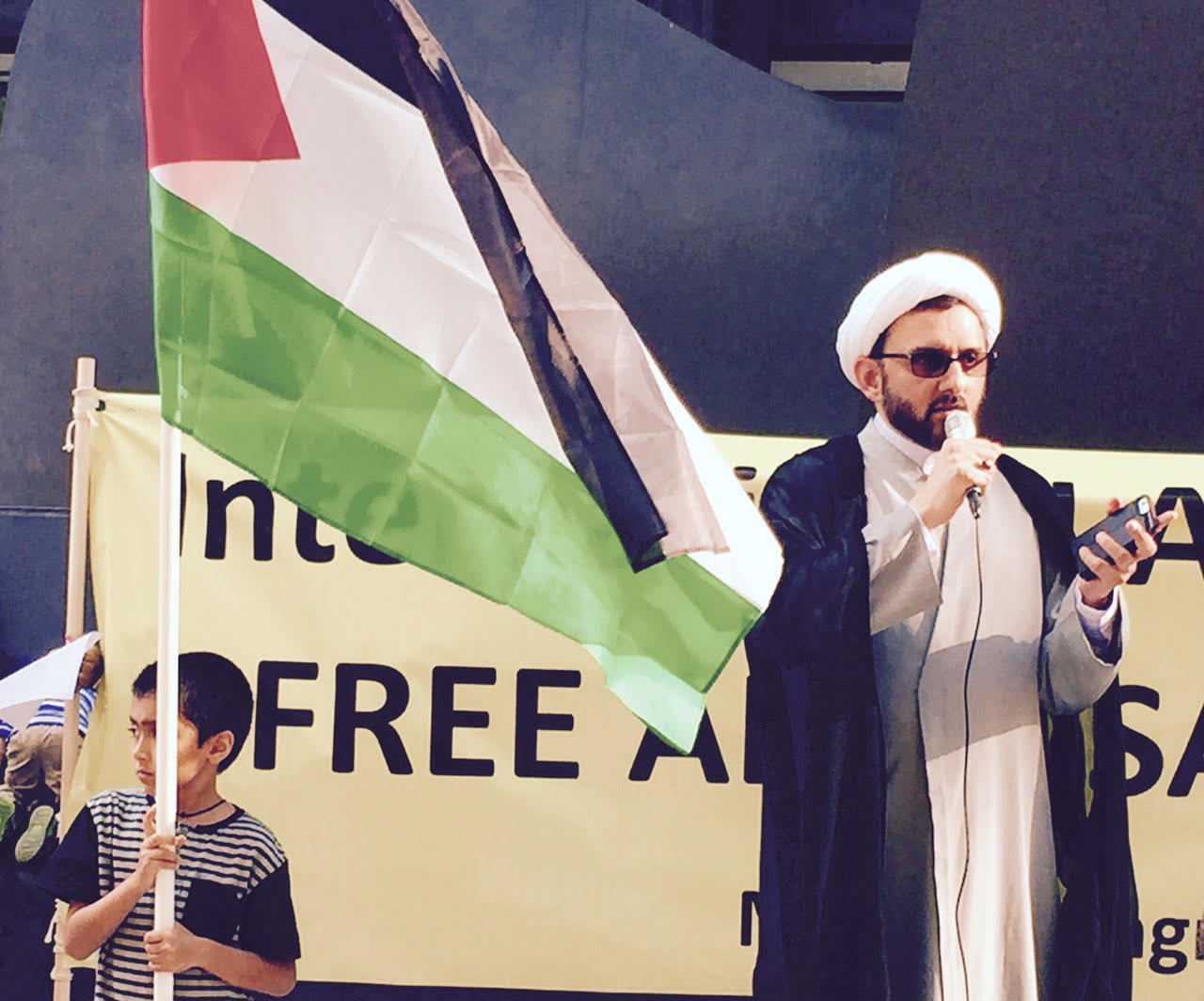
Shamshad Haider from the Muslim Congress speaking during the 2015 Quds rally, Chicago.

=== Austria ===
According to Samuel Laster, the editor-in-chief of the online news outlet Die Jüdische ("The Jewish"), 700 people participated an anti-Israeli rally in Vienna, while 150 pro-Israel counter-protesters hold a similar event to support Israel.

=== Germany ===
Almost 700 people participated the 2015 Quds Day rally in Berlin, Germany. The participants chanted "Child murderer Israel" and other slogans, according to German media outlets. A counter-rally comprising 250 participants was also held. Several members of Neturei Karta, an anti-Zionist Jewish religious group that calls for a dismantling of the State of Israel, took part in the rally.

=== Iran ===
Millions of people held rallies in 770 cities across Iran chanting "Down with America" and "Death to Israel" on Al-Quds Day.

=== United Kingdom ===
In London, a protest was organized by the Islamic Human Rights Commission.

=== United States ===
Almost 250 people participated in a Quds Day rally held in Chicago. Besides focusing on the "continuing siege of Gaza", the speakers "called for the U.S. to end military aid to Israel." Almost 150 people formed a rally at the CNN center in Atlanta to support the Palestinian people and call for the US government to stop supporting the state of Israel.

== 2016 Quds day ==
=== Iran ===
Demonstrations took place across Iran on July 1, 2016. According to The Washington Post, "tens of thousands" of people marched in the capital, Tehran. Some protesters trampled on Israeli flags, and some chanted "death to Israel" and "down with the USA."

At a sermon in Tehran on Al-Quds day, IRGC Deputy Commander Hossein Salami claimed that over 100,000 missiles in Lebanon, as well as thousands more throughout the Islamic world, were ready "strike at the heart of the Zionist regime. They will prepare the ground for its great collapse in the new era. ... They are just waiting for the command, so that when the trigger is pulled, the accursed black dot will be wiped off the geopolitical map of the world, once and for all."

=== North America ===
Al-Quds Day demonstrations were scheduled for several cities in the United States and Canada. In Toronto, the demonstration route began at Queen's Park, the provincial legislature, and proceeded to the U.S. Consulate. In Toronto, Calgary, New York City, Chicago, Boston and Los Angeles, the Jewish Defense League organized counter-demonstrations.

=== United Kingdom ===
Demonstrations in London were organized by the Islamic Human Rights Commission (IHRC) on Sunday, July 3, 2016. The terminus of the demonstration route is the U.S. Embassy at Grosvenor Square. Counter-demonstrations were organized by Sussex Friends of Israel (SFI).

== 2017 Quds day ==
=== United Kingdom ===
The Quds Day march for 2017 occurred that year on June 18. In London, the march went on as planned although more than 15,000 people had petitioned Mayor Sadiq Khan to forbid it. The Hezbollah flag was flown during the event, as the organisation at the time was not on the proscribed list.

The driver in the 2017 Finsbury Park van attack allegedly made references to the pro-Palestinian march before the attack.

== Germany 1996–2019 ==
In the German capital Berlin Al-Quds demonstrations were held first in 1996 and then every year until 2019. The events were sometimes watched and reported by the German intelligence agency Federal Office for the Protection of the Constitution.

The 2020 and 2021 demonstrations were cancelled by the organizers, citing COVID-19 restrictions. In 2020, Hezbollah was banned in Germany, with Interior Minister Horst Seehofer pointing to hate speech by fundamentalist Shia Muslims against Israel.

== 2024 Quds day ==
Tens of thousands of people around the world staged rallies as an extension of the Gaza war protests. More than 37,000 Palestinians have been killed by Israel. Events occurred in Indonesia, Iran, Iraq, Kashmir, Lebanon and Malaysia. In Houston, Texas, at least three protesters at an Al Quds day demonstration were arrested and a further demonstration took place outside of Harris County Jail.

On the 2024 Quds Day, a pro-Palestine rally was also organised in Dearborn, where some protesters chanted Death to America and Death to Israel. The Al Quds Committee Detroit, which organised the rally, posted on Facebook that the chants were "wrongful" and "a mistake", but that they will also continue to criticise the foreign policy of the United States.
