= Sankey for Penketh railway station =

Railway station in Cheshire, England

Sankey for Penketh
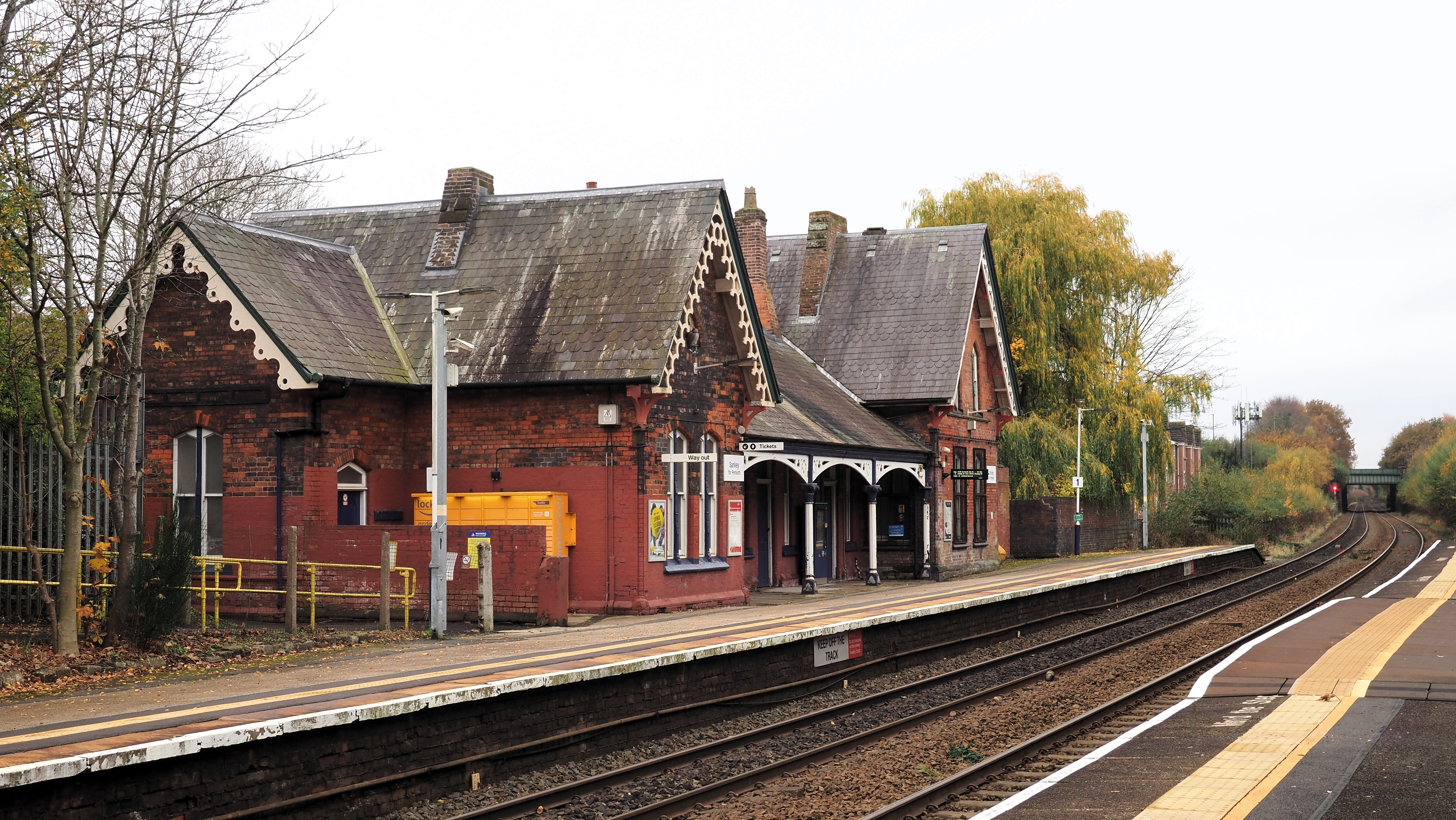
- Sankey for Penketh railway station pictured in 2025

General information
- Location: Great Sankey, Warrington; England
- Coordinates: 53.3923°N 2.6506°W
- Grid reference: SJ568885
- Manager: Northern Trains
- Platforms: 2

Other information
- Station code: SNK
- Classification: DfT category E

History
- Original company: Cheshire Lines Committee
- Pre-grouping: Cheshire Lines Committee
- Post-grouping: Cheshire Lines Committee

Key dates
- 1 May 1874: Opened as Sankey
- 1904: Renamed Sankey for Penketh

Passengers
- 2021/22: ▲2,930
- 2022/23: ▲3,358
- 2023/24: ▼1,362
- 2024/25: ▼1,204
- 2025/26: ▲1,374
Location
Notes
- Passenger statistics from the Office of Rail and Road

Sankey for Penketh railway station, also known as just Sankey, is a railway station in the west of Warrington, Cheshire, England, serving the Great Sankey, Penketh and Whittle Hall areas of the town. The station, and all trains serving it, are operated by Northern Trains. It is designated by English Heritage as a Grade II listed building.

== History ==
The line through the station site opened for freight on 1 March 1873 and for passengers on 1 August 1873 when the Cheshire Lines Committee opened the line between Glazebrook and Cressington & Grassendale.

The station was opened as Sankey for passengers and goods on 1 May 1874.

The station is located in a cutting where the line is bridged by what is now Station Road. The main station building is of the "common twin-pavilion type adopted by the CLC" with a larger, two-storey, projecting pavilion forming a house and a smaller single-storey one. Linking them is an entrance hall, ticket office and three-bay iron-arcaded waiting shelter. The building is decorated with elaborately fretted bargeboards. The station was equipped with a carved stone drinking fountain.

It had two platforms, both accessed by steps down from the road overbridge, the Liverpool bound platform could also be accessed from the road access to the station building. There was a goods yard to the south of the lines and west of the station. The goods yard was able to accommodate most types of goods including several cattle pens for livestock, it was equipped with a five-ton crane.

During 1904 the station was renamed Sankey for Penketh.

The station closed to goods traffic on 5 November 1962, except for a private siding, which has subsequently also closed.

== Facilities ==
The main station building is used as a waiting room, though part of the building is a house and another part disused. Passengers have little shelter available when the main building is closed and seats are only available on the Manchester bound platform, which has a shelter.

The station is unstaffed. There is a car park outside and the former goods yard has been used for building houses. The station was upgraded in May 2013 with automated announcements and in 2016, digital information screens were added. Step-free access is available to both platforms.

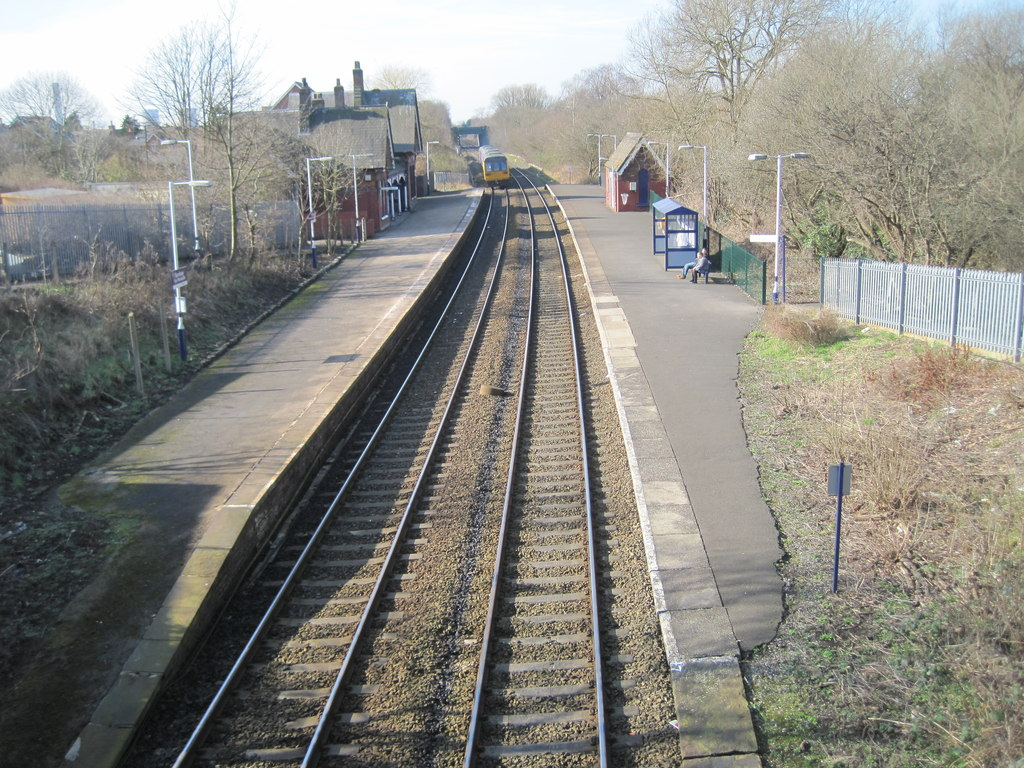
Sankey for Penketh railway station in March 2012

== Services ==
Prior to the opening of the nearby Warrington West in December 2019, services departed Sankey for Penketh approximately hourly in each direction; however since the opening of the new station, Sankey for Penketh now only has two services a day in each direction, one in each direction in the morning and one in each direction in the evening. The morning services are the 07:28 to Warrington Central only and the 07:48 towards Liverpool Lime Street. The evening services the 17:28 to Warrington Central only and the 17:48 towards Liverpool Lime Street. These services are operated by Northern using Class 195 Diesel multiple units.

As of December 2025, services from Sankey for Penketh no longer run to Manchester Oxford Road.

== See also ==
- Listed buildings in Great Sankey

== Bibliography ==
- Biddle, Gordon (2003). Britain's Historic Railway Buildings: An Oxford Gazeteer of Structures and Sites. Oxford: Oxford University Press. ISBN 9780198662471.
- Bolger, Paul (1984). An illustrated history of the Cheshire lines committee. Heyday. ISBN 978-0-947562-00-7.
- Clinker, C.R. (October 1978). Clinker's Register of Closed Passenger Stations and Goods Depots in England, Scotland and Wales 1830–1977. Bristol: Avon-Anglia Publications & Services. ISBN 0-905466-19-5. OCLC 5726624.
- Quick, Michael (2022) [2001]. Railway passenger stations in Great Britain: a chronology (PDF). version 5.04. Railway & Canal Historical Society. Archived from the original (PDF) on 25 November 2022.
- The Railway Clearing House (1970) [1904]. The Railway Clearing House Handbook of Railway Stations 1904 (1970 D&C Reprint ed.). Newton Abbot: David & Charles Reprints. ISBN 0-7153-5120-6.

| Preceding station | National Rail | Following station |
|---|---|---|
| Widnes | Northern Trains; Manchester – Liverpool line | Warrington West |
| Widnes | Northern Trains; Manchester – Liverpool line | Warrington Central |
| | Disused railways | |
| Tanhouse Lane; Line and station closed | Sheffield and Midland Railway Companies' Committee; Widnes Loop | Warrington Central; Line and station open |
