= Omega Development Site =

Mixed-use development in Warrington, Cheshire, England

Coordinates: 53.414°N 2.653°W

Omega is a property development site in Warrington, Cheshire comprising 226 hectares straddling the M62 motorway. The site comprises a large part of the former RAF/USAF Burtonwood airbase. A new junction on the M62 (junction 8) was built in anticipation of the development.

The whole site was to provide 650,000 sq m of offices, manufacturing and distribution space along with ancillary leisure/retail facilities, hotel and conference facilities. Around 24,000 jobs were hoped to be created over the lifetime of the scheme to make one of Europe's largest business parks.

A large part of the southern part of the site was eventually allocated to new housing.

== Phasing ==
Planning conditions were relaxed in 2011 during the Great Recession to allow phased development.

In July 2012 it was announced that the long-awaited £1bn development of Warrington’s Omega business park was to begin with a 200,000 sq ft warehouse and a £7 million contract for new roads at Omega North, opening up the site for further development. By 2015 Omega North was complete with distribution warehouses for Brake Bros, Hermes Group, and Travis Perkins. Omega South had The Hut Group, Amazon UK, Domino's Pizza, and the largest Walmart development outside the USA with an Asda distribution warehouse, and plans for retail, leisure, and phased housing developments.

== Transport ==
Warrington West railway station on the Liverpool-Warrington-Manchester line was completed in November 2019 and opened on 15 December 2019. There is a bus link from Warrington West to the Omega site.
