= Warrington West railway station =

Railway station in Cheshire, England

Warrington West
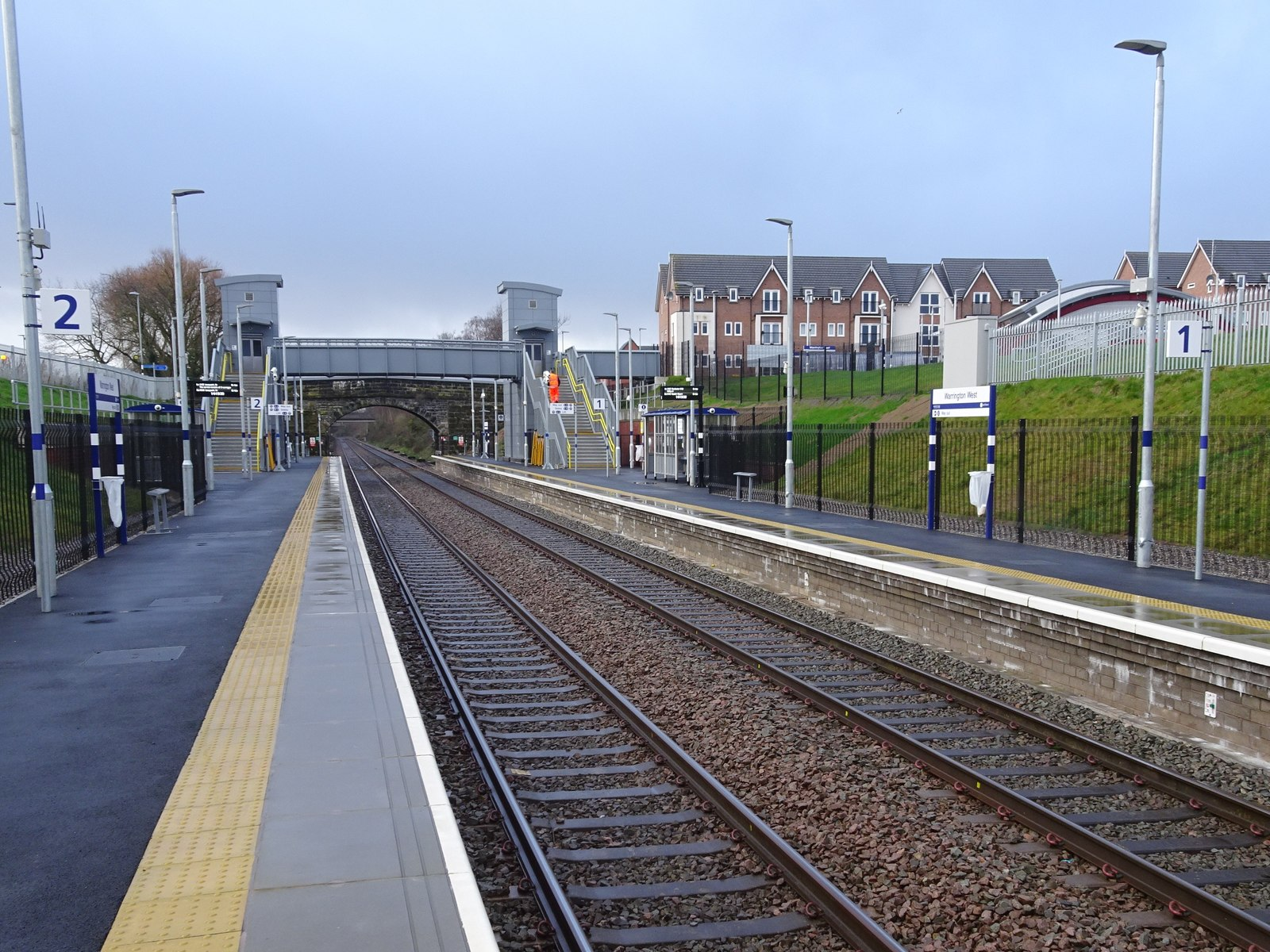

General information
- Location: Great Sankey, Warrington; England
- Coordinates: 53°23′37″N 2°38′13″W
- Owner: Network Rail
- Operator: Northern Trains
- Platforms: 2
- Tracks: 2

Other information
- Station code: WAW

History
- Original company: Network Rail

Key dates
- 16 December 2019: Opened

Passengers
- 2020/21: ▼68,936
- 2021/22: ▲0.269 million
- 2022/23: ▲0.280 million
- Interchange: 3,933
- 2023/24: ▲0.332 million
- Interchange: ▼3,245
- 2024/25: ▲0.389 million
- Interchange: ▲3,661
Location
- Location within Cheshire
Notes
- Passenger statistics from the Office of Rail and Road

Warrington West is a railway station on the Liverpool–Manchester line. The station, situated 17 miles (27 km) east of Liverpool Lime Street, serves the civil parish of Great Sankey, Warrington in Cheshire, England. It is owned by Network Rail and managed by Northern Trains.

It is served by bus services and has parking for 287 cars. The station is located west of Warrington on the existing southern Liverpool–Manchester line, between Sankey for Penketh and Warrington Central.

== History ==
The station under construction, photographed in February 2019.

Warrington Borough Council applied for funding from the Government's New Stations Fund but the bid failed. However, the council secured part of the funding through other sources and a planning application was approved in 2015, and it was hoped that construction could begin in 2016, until Network Rail increased the estimated cost by £4 million. A fresh bid to the New Stations Fund was successful, and the station opened on 16 December 2019.

== Services ==
Services at Warrington West are operated by Northern Trains and TransPennine Express.

As of December 2022, the station is served by an hourly stopping service between Warrington Central and Liverpool Lime Street, as well as an hourly service between Manchester Oxford Road and Liverpool Lime Street which runs semi-fast from Warrington West. These services combine to give the station an off-peak service of two trains per hour in each direction. On Sundays, this is reduced to an hourly stopping service between Liverpool Lime Street and Manchester Oxford Road.

The station is also served by three trains per day between Cleethorpes and Liverpool Lime Street, operated by TransPennine Express. These trains run non-stop to and from Liverpool South Parkway. On Sundays, most TransPennine Express services call at the station, providing a roughly hourly service in each direction.

Preceding station	National Rail	Following station
Sankey for Penketh or Widnes	Northern Trains Liverpool to Manchester Line	Warrington Central
Liverpool South Parkway	TransPennine Express South TransPennine	Warrington Central
