= Warrington Central railway station =

Railway station in Cheshire, England

Warrington Central
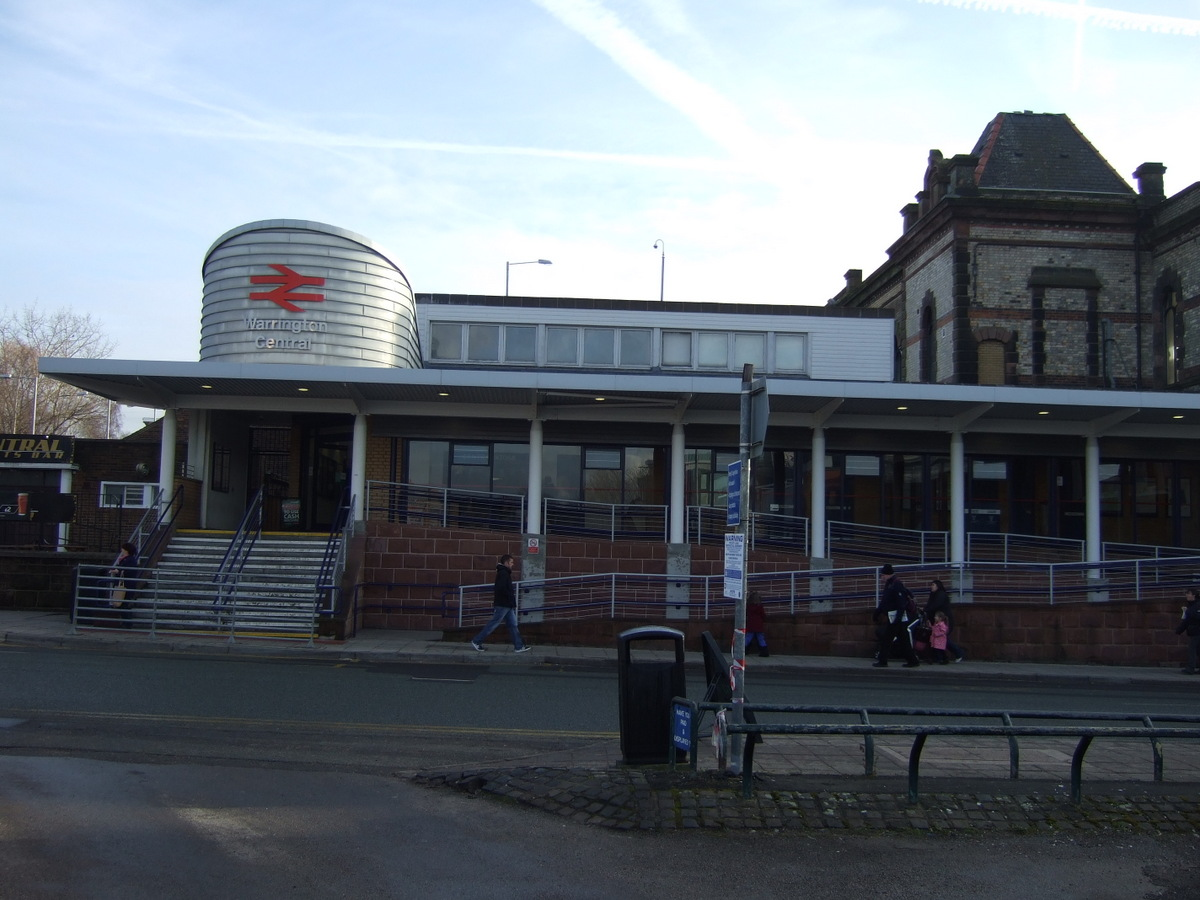
- Warrington Central railway station in February 2013

General information
- Location: Warrington, Borough of Warrington; England
- Coordinates: 53.3918°N 2.5930°W
- Grid reference: SJ606885
- Managed by: Northern Trains
- Platforms: 2

Other information
- Station code: WAC
- Classification: DfT category D

History
- Original company: Cheshire Lines Committee
- Pre-grouping: Cheshire Lines Committee
- Post-grouping: Cheshire Lines Committee

Key dates
- 9 June 1873: Opened for goods
- 1 August 1873: Opened as Warrington for passengers
- 1875: Renamed Warrington Central
- 1 October 1965: Closed for goods

Passengers
- 2020/21: ▼0.305 million
- Interchange: ▼63,059
- 2021/22: ▲0.939 million
- Interchange: ▲0.145 million
- 2022/23: ▲1.103 million
- Interchange: ▲0.303 million
- 2023/24: ▲1.215 million
- Interchange: ▼0.263 million
- 2024/25: ▲1.268 million
- Interchange: ▼81,594
Location
Notes
- Passenger statistics from the Office of Rail and Road

Warrington Central is one of three main railway stations serving the town of Warrington in Cheshire, England. It is located on the southern route of the Liverpool to Manchester Lines, the former Cheshire Lines Committee route between Liverpool and Manchester; the station is situated approximately halfway between the two cities.

The second station in the town is Warrington Bank Quay, which accommodates electrified lines on the West Coast Main Line with services to London Euston, Birmingham New Street, Liverpool Lime Street and Glasgow Central. The third is Warrington West, which opened in 2019 and is on the same line as Warrington Central.

== History ==
The station opened as Warrington on 1 August 1873 when the Cheshire Lines Committee opened the line between Glazebrook and Cressington & Grassendale to passengers. The suffix Central was added in 1875. (Note: The line had opened for freight on 1 March 1873, it was part of the route from Stockport to Liverpool.)

=== Passenger station ===
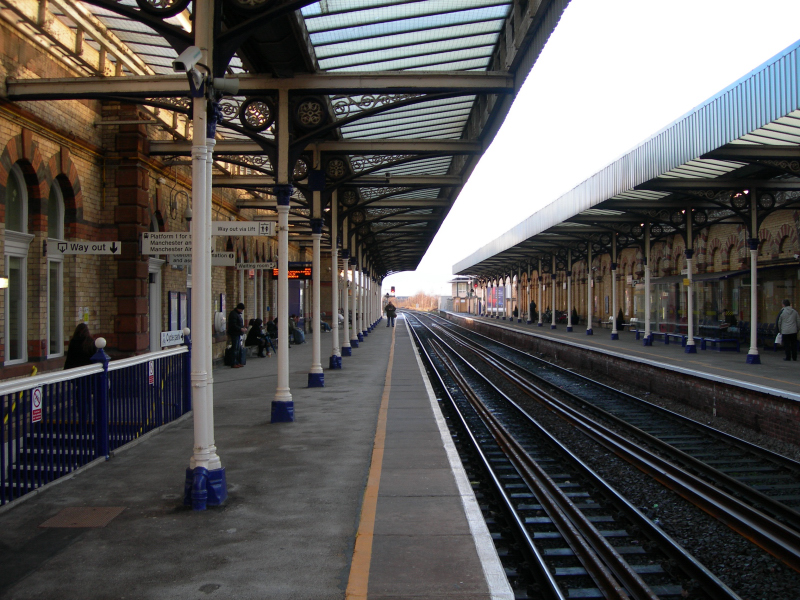
Warrington Central station's eastbound platform 1 towards to Manchester, westbound platform 2 to Liverpool

The station is located on a raised embankment on the eastern side of where the line crosses Winwick Street, on the northern edge of the town centre. The Cheshire Lines Committee (CLC) 1865 plan had Warrington station positioned to the north on the straight route, halfway between Padgate and Sankey stations in a direct line; this would have been about 1,000 yards (910 m) further from the town. As a result of Warrington residents agitating to have the railway come closer to the town centre. A loop was constructed into the town and Warrington station and goods yard was constructed on it. The loop and station opened in 1873; the direct route, otherwise known as the Warrington avoiding line, was not opened until 1883.

The original station building, which faces away from the town and is not easily seen by passengers, is an impressively long one-storey fine Italianate building of twenty bays in yellow brick with decorative stonework, numerous rusticated round-headed windows, a projecting central block with balustrades. The western end has a pavilion with a pyramidal roof.

It had (and still has) two platforms on either side of two running lines with a subway between them at the Winwick Street end. This subway was later opened out to provide access direct from Winwick Street to each platform. Although the train timetable has often included passenger train services terminating at Warrington Central, there have never been any bay platforms. Terminating services use one of the two through platforms and usually proceed afterwards, as empty coaching stock, into the sidings to the east of the station

The station was rebuilt in 1983 with a street-level entrance facing on to Winwick Street. Lifts to both platforms were installed in June 2008. The station was refurbished in 2011 with improvements to "customer facilities".

=== Goods station ===
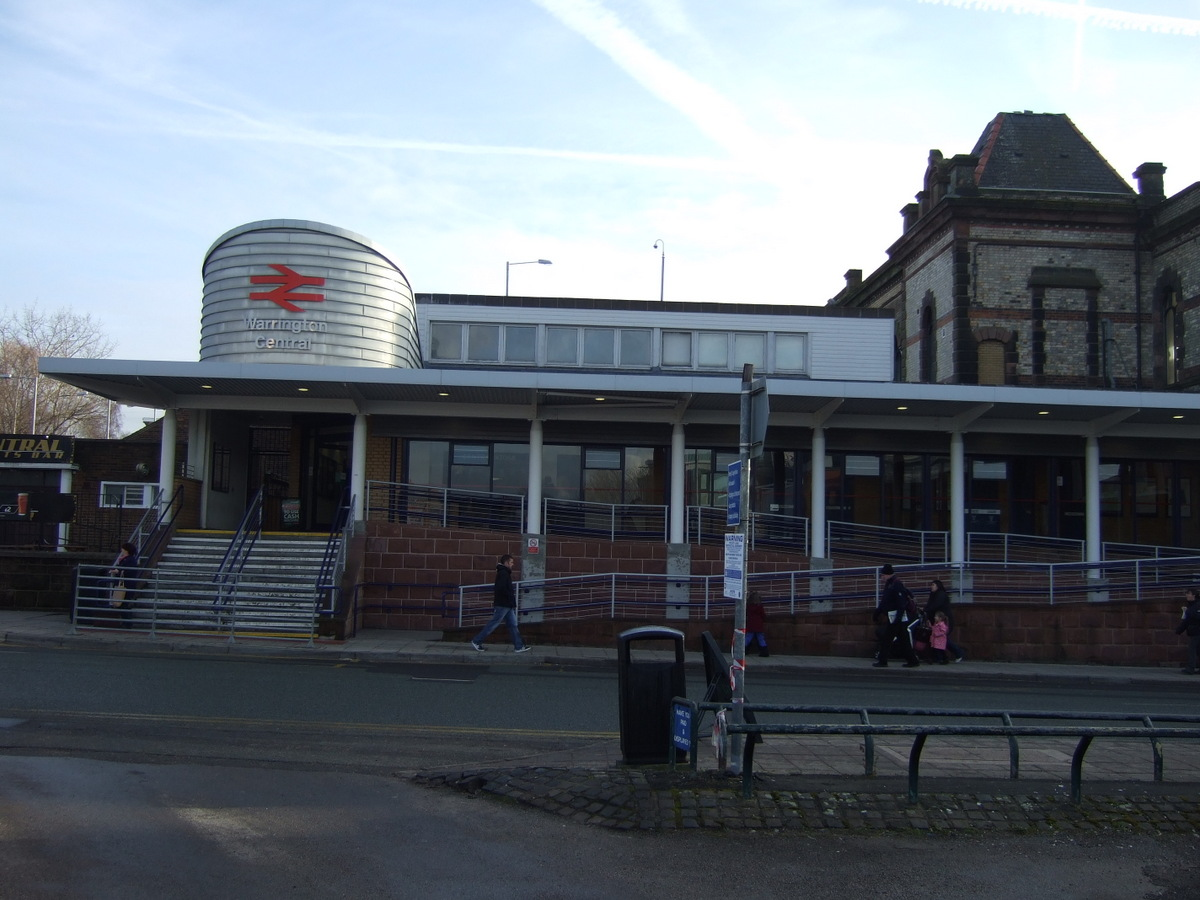
The exterior of the station in February 2013

There was a goods yard and shed to the north of the lines and east of the station.

The original goods shed was adjacent to the main running lines, it had one line running through it, with a further goods platform to its north. The goods yard was able to accommodate most types of goods including live stock and was equipped with a five ton crane.

It was replaced in 1897 by a larger building set further back from the main lines, on the site of the original goods platform. This warehouse was a three-storey buff-red brick with segmental windows set in brick panels decorated with moulded Accrington brick. The dominant feature of the warehouse is the series of large concrete panels under the roofline displaying the name of the CLC and its owning companies. It is recorded in the National Heritage List for England as a designated Grade II listed building.

There were several cattle pens to the north-west of the goods yard and several short sidings immediately to the east of the passenger station. The goods yard crane had been upgraded to ten-tons.

The goods depot was the last on the line, goods traffic ceased and the depot closed in 1982.

The warehouse has been redeveloped into apartments with several new build blocks occupying the former goods yard site.

=== Engine shed ===
Sometime prior to 1893 a single road engine shed was provided to the south of the station, immediately behind the Liverpool bound platform. The shed was a sub-shed of Brunswick which usually supplied three locomotives. Turntable facilities were available on the spur to Whitecross Ironworks approximately half a mile away from the station. The shed had been demolished by 1938, leaving just a stabling road. By 1955 there were two stabling sidings with a headshunt. It became a sub-shed of Trafford Park when Brunswick closed in 1961 and probably closed around 1966.

=== Accidents and incidents ===
On 4 November 1880 a Cheshire Lines passenger train from Liverpool came slightly into collision with the rear of a Midland goods train, there were no injuries.

== Facilities ==
From street level, passengers climb six steps or a short ramp to reach the booking office, and climb further steps or use the lifts to reach the platforms. The station has a customer service office, toilets, waiting rooms, a newsagent and a coffee stall. Outside there is a car park and a taxi rank. The station is located close to Warrington Bus Interchange.

== Services ==
As of the May 2023 timetable, an average of eight trains an hour stop at Warrington Central at off-peak times. Northern Trains operates one through stopping service in each direction each hour between Liverpool Lime Street and Manchester Oxford Road plus a second service each hour to/from Liverpool that starts/finishes here. Some extra peak and early morning/late evening services also operate between here and Manchester. On Sundays the service is hourly.

East Midlands Railway operates an hourly service to and from Liverpool Lime Street calling at Liverpool South Parkway and Widnes, which continues via Manchester, Sheffield and Nottingham to Norwich. Late services run to Nottingham only.

TransPennine Express also operates hourly services from Liverpool to Manchester, Sheffield, Doncaster and Cleethorpes This calls at Birchwood, Irlam and Urmston en-route to Manchester Mondays to Saturdays (Birchwood only on a Sunday).

Preceding station	National Rail	Following station
Warrington West	Northern Trains; Liverpool Lime Street – Manchester Airport	Birchwood
Widnes	Northern Trains; Liverpool to Manchester Line	Padgate
Warrington West	Northern Trains; Liverpool to Manchester Line	Birchwood
Widnes	East Midlands Railway; Liverpool – Norwich	Manchester Oxford Road
Widnes	East Midlands Railway; Liverpool – Norwich	Birchwood; Limited Service
Warrington West	TransPennine Express; South TransPennine	Birchwood
Liverpool South Parkway	TransPennine Express; South TransPennine	Birchwood
	Future services	
Liverpool Lime Street	Northern Connect; Liverpool Lime Street – Manchester Airport	Manchester Piccadilly

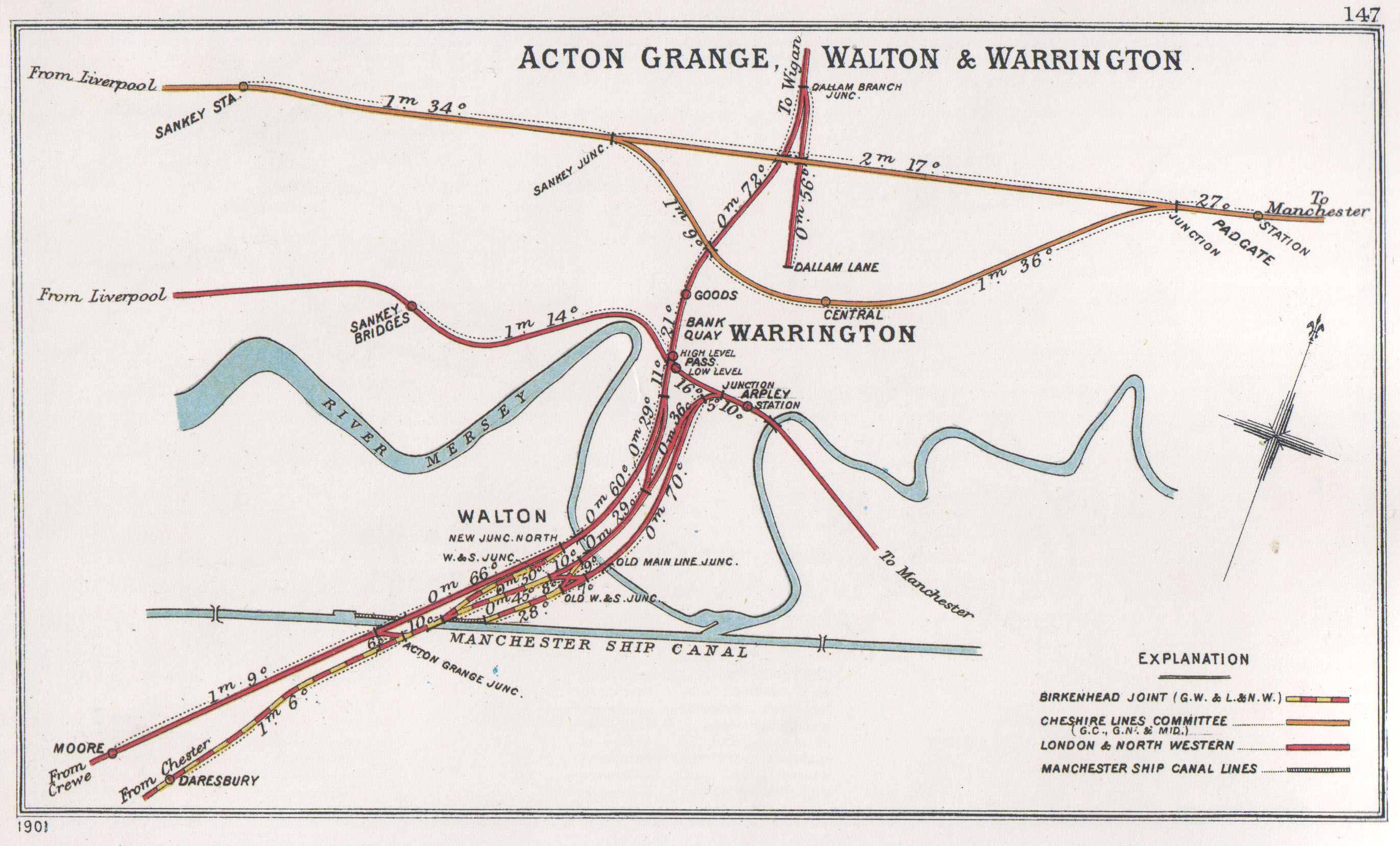
Acton Grange, Walton & Warrington RJD 147

== Bibliography ==
- Biddle, Gordon (1973). Victorian stations; railway stations in England & Wales, 1830-1923;. Newton Abbot [England]: David & Charles. ISBN 0-7153-5949-5. OCLC 812317.
- Biddle, Gordon (2003). Britain's Historic Railway Buildings: An Oxford Gazeteer of Structures and Sites. Oxford: Oxford University Press. ISBN 9780198662471.
- Bolger, Paul (1984). An illustrated history of the Cheshire lines committee. Heyday. ISBN 978-0-947562-00-7.
- Griffiths, R. Prys; Goode, C.T. (1978). The Cheshire Lines Railway (Revised edition (1947) with additional notes ed.). Oakwood Press.
- Oliver, Henry; Airey, John (1894). Hand-book and Appendix of Stations, Junctions, Sidings, Collieries, &c., on the Railways in United Kingdom.
- Quick, Michael (2022) [2001]. Railway passenger stations in Great Britain: a chronology (PDF). version 5.04. Railway & Canal Historical Society. Archived from the original (PDF) on 25 November 2022.
- The Railway Clearing House (1970) [1904]. The Railway Clearing House Handbook of Railway Stations 1904 (1970 D&C Reprint ed.). Newton Abbot: David & Charles Reprints. ISBN 0-7153-5120-6.
