= Voice of the Cape =

Radio station in Cape Town, South Africa

Coordinates: 33.93277111°S 18.45729883°E

The Voice of the Cape
Western Cape; South Africa
- Frequencies: Cape Town: 91.3 FM | Worcester; Paarl: 95.8 FM | Hout Bay: 90.9 FM | Simons Town: 89.8 FM

Programming
- Languages: English, Afrikaans
- Format: Islamic broadcasting; Community talk

History
- First air date: January 1995

Links
- Website: www.vocfm.co.za

The Voice of the Cape is a Muslim community radio station based in Cape Town, South Africa. The first Muslim radio station in South Africa, the station started broadcasting on a special license in 1995 for the month of Ramadaan. Its license is held by the Muslim Broadcasting Corporation.

== History ==
The idea of a Muslim radio station was born in the early 1990s by such people as Imam Noor Davids and Imam Gassan Solomon (then Secretary General of the Muslim Judicial Council), for the purpose of community advancement.

Subsequent temporary broadcast licenses were granted, permitting the station to broadcast for 24 hours, sharing the frequency with another Muslim radio station. In June 2002, the station was awarded a four-year license on the same basis, one which has been successfully renewed in 2006.According to the broadcasting authority, VOC is an interest-defined community broadcaster licensed to serve the cultural interest of the Muslim community. The station’s mandate is to inform and educate the community about Islam, with an inherent focus on religious teachings. Another focus of VOC’s programming is to report matters of cultural, political, social and economic significance.

== Programming ==
The Drivetime Show is hosted by Shafiq Morton and has a national and international flavour. During the show the interviews will focus on issues making news nationally, be it the enquiry into the Arms Deal to the current famine in the Horn of Africa. The after five interview on Drivetime, will usually be the analysis slot where the biggest story of the day or week is analyzed. High-energy, informative and hard-hitting, Breakfast Beat packs a mean punch. This show is a current affairs and actuality show, which focuses mainly on issues that are of concern to the community that Voice of the Cape serves. The show feature interviews with prominent politicians, community activists, religious leaders, academic experts and ordinary people. Everything that focuses on anything related to women, life and empowerment. Monday to Thursday mornings are presented by Ayesha Lattoe. The content echoes the name of the show – a platform that creates discussion around issues of religion, legal, consumer related, news and human interest stories. Hosted by seasoned photo-journalist and writer Yazeed Kamaldien who has a passion for community news, the 2 hour discussion show is interactive with the lines open for people to voice their opinions while the experts answer the questions. Anything and everything to do with education whether it be debates, uplifting and being a support to educators and parents and looking at the labour issues that South African teachers are faced with is the aim of this show. Provincial Executive Officer of Naptosa, Riedwaan Ahmad & Yaseera Adonis are the hosts of the show and have excellent insight into the education system.

== Outreach ==
Every Ramadan Voice Of The Cape teams up with many organisations all over Cape Town to distribute food hampers to those people who are in need.
