= Great Sankey High School =

Location
- Barrowhall Lane; Warrington, Cheshire, WA5 3AA; England; 53.401°N 2.662°W

Information
- Type: Academy
- Motto: Achieving Greatness Together
- Established: 1970s
- Department for Education URN: 139152 Tables
- Ofsted: Reports
- Head teacher: Gary Evans
- Staff: c. 200
- Gender: Coeducational
- Age: 11 to 18
- Enrolment: 2,005
- Houses: Austen, Bannister, Newton, Parks, Stephenson, Thompson
- Colours: Black & Green
- Publication: Contact Magazine
- Website: www.greatsankey.org

Great Sankey High School (GSHS) is a coeducational secondary school and sixth form with academy status, located in Warrington, Cheshire, England. It is a member of the Omega Multi-Academy Trust (OMAT). The school was first built in the 1970s and extensions have included a mathematics & humanities block and theatre. The school also has a linking leisure centre and arts theatre. GSHS has been awarded, and retained, an Artsmark Gold award, the highest award for the Arts.

GSHS is partnered with South Peninsula High School in Cape Town, South Africa.

In 2010, GSHS was classified as an Outstanding school by Ofsted. The school converted to academy status in January 2013. In October 2017, the school was reclassified by Ofsted as a Good school.

== Extensions ==
A new purpose-built sixth-form college was opened on the school site in September 2011 by Alan Yates (former Headteacher) and Simon Moran (Managing Director of SJM Concerts).

In December 2019, the new PE hall was opened by current headteacher John Shannon on the site of what used to be the neighbouring primary school, Barrow Hall Primary School, along with a diner in use for the Year 7s that was completed in January 2019. The new science block containing 11 laboratories that was built on the same construction site was opened in February 2020.The plans for taking the school’s grounds were confirmed by previous headteacher, Paula Crawley, when Barrow Hall Primary School relocated to a close area.

== Specialisms ==
In 2004, the school was awarded specialist schools status in the field of Engineering and has since increased the provision of Engineering throughout the curriculum. The school also operates a Young Apprentice scheme, where Year 10 students have the opportunity to Start a two-year course and earn an NVQ level 2 with the school.

In a partnership with the RAC, the school has built an RAC automotive engineering skills centre. This allows students studying engineering and automotive engineering, access to Facilities that few other engineering colleges possess, whilst also providing facilities for other schools and businesses in the local community.

The school has a VEX robotics team called BHCVEX as part of the Engineering department. The team first initiated in 2010 when the team also won their first trophy in a regional competition using the Standard VEX Protobot and Tumbler kit. In 2012 the team participated in the VEX robotics UK national competition and won the competition, qualifying them for the world finals in California, However due to insufficient funds the team could not attend. Sack attack is the 2012-2013 season game, different from the 2011-2012 Gateway game. BHCVEX were finalists in the North West regional in the 2012-2013 season, which qualified them for the 2013 UK national competition where they won the tournament in alliance with two other teams from East Barnet School qualifying the team for the world championships in Anaheim.

== Sport ==
The school has many teams participating in sports such as football, rugby league, hockey, netball, basketball, cricket, badminton, athletics, and handball.

On 24 August 2019, Great Sankey High School’s Year 7 Rugby team won the Champion Schools Final against Standish High School at Wembley Stadium. While on 8 July 2022, Great Sankey High School's Year 10 Rugby team won the Champion Schools Final against Spen Valley High School at Kingston Park In the same competition, in 2023, Great Sankey's Year 11 team beat Spen Valley High School 38-8 at the Millennium Stadium to win a third Champions Schools in a row.

== Music ==
The school has two main bands that perform regularly in the local area and abroad, in locations such as Italy, France, Spain and Germany and have played in the UK in London (Covent Garden) and Warrington train station (where they played for the Duke of Edinburgh). In the past, the Concert Band has achieved a silver medal at international level competing against some of the best school and college bands from all around the world. More recently, the Concert Band has achieved a gold award at the regional series of the National Concert Band Festival (2008), held at GSHS, and were invited to play at the 2009 national finals in Cardiff where they achieved a highly commended bronze award. The Swing Band competed in Warwick at the national finals last year after gaining a gold medal at the regional series in 2007. Both bands performed by formal invitation on the Fantasy Festival Stage at Disneyland Park, Paris, in summer 2008, 2012 and 2014.

GSHS also has a choir. Sankey Singers has performed in the regional rounds of the National Festival of Music for Youth. They also joined the Swing Band for their 2014 performance in Disneyland.

== Notable former pupils ==
- Shafilea Ahmed – murder victim
- Kathleen Dawson – backstroke swimmer and gold medal-winner at 2020 Tokyo Olympics
- Paul Dennett – Mayor of Salford
- Ben Evans – rugby league player for London Broncos, Warrington Wolves, Bradford Bulls, Toulouse Olympique and Wales
- Rhys Evans – rugby league player for Warrington Wolves and Leigh Centurions
- Andrew Gower – actor
- Gareth O'Brien – rugby league player for Warrington Wolves, Salford Red Devils, Toronto Wolfpack, Castleford Tigers and Leigh Centurions
- Gemma Prescott – Paralympic athlete in F32 throwing events
