= South Peninsula High School =

Location
- Cape Town, South Africa
- Coordinates: 34°1′45″S 18°27′42″E

Information
- Motto: Non Ministrari Sed Ministrare; Not to be served but to serve
- Established: 1950
- Principal: Zeid Baker
- Enrollment: c.1000
- Houses: Azalea, Kendal, Mimosa, Protea
- Colours: Dark Red and Gold
- Publication: Speak Up
- Website: http://www.sphigh.org/

South Peninsula High School is a secondary school in Diep River, a suburb of Cape Town, South Africa. The school celebrated its 60th anniversary in 2010, after opening in 1950.

South Peninsula High School accepts many students from historically disadvantaged areas in Cape Town including Mitchells Plain, Grassy Park, Lotus River, Heathfield, Strandfontein and Retreat. The school is twinned with Great Sankey High School, in Warrington, England, and used to run an exchange programme for staff and students.

== Alumni ==
Notable alumni of the school include

- Riaad Moosa, comedian
