= Spen Valley High School =

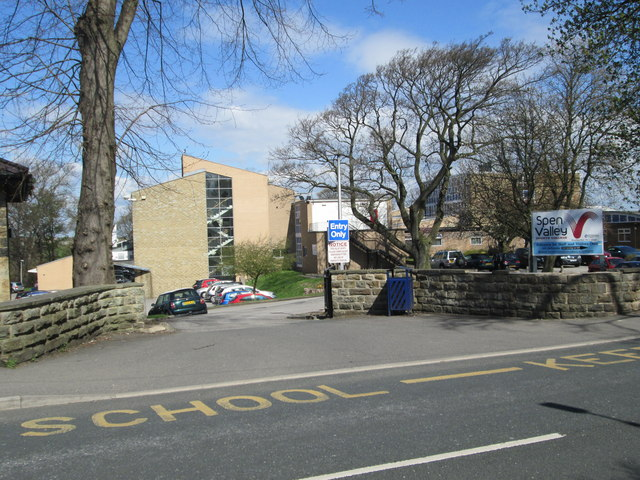
- Spen Valley Sports College seen from Roberttown Lane (2013)

Location
- Roberttown Lane; Liversedge, West Yorkshire, WF15 7LX; England
- Coordinates: 53°42′19″N 1°41′52″W

Information
- Type: Foundation school
- Local authority: Kirklees
- Department for Education URN: 107778 Tables
- Ofsted: Reports
- Headteacher: Kyle Audsley
- Gender: Coeducational
- Age: 11 to 16
- Enrolment: 900 pupils
- Website: http://www.spenvalleyhighschool.co.uk/

Spen Valley High School is a high school situated in Liversedge, West Yorkshire, England.

The school's proportion of pupils who do not have learning difficulties and/or disabilities and those who have a statement of special educational needs exceeds the national average. The 15–20% of pupils from minority ethnic backgrounds are predominantly of Pakistani heritage. The proportion of pupils not entitled to free school meals is slightly under the national average. The school gained specialist status as a sports college in 2004. Artsmark and Sportsmark status are also held by the school, and in 2006 it was re-accredited as Investors in People.
