= RAF Burtonwood =

Former air force base in Cheshire, England

RAF Burtonwood
- Near Warrington, Cheshire in England
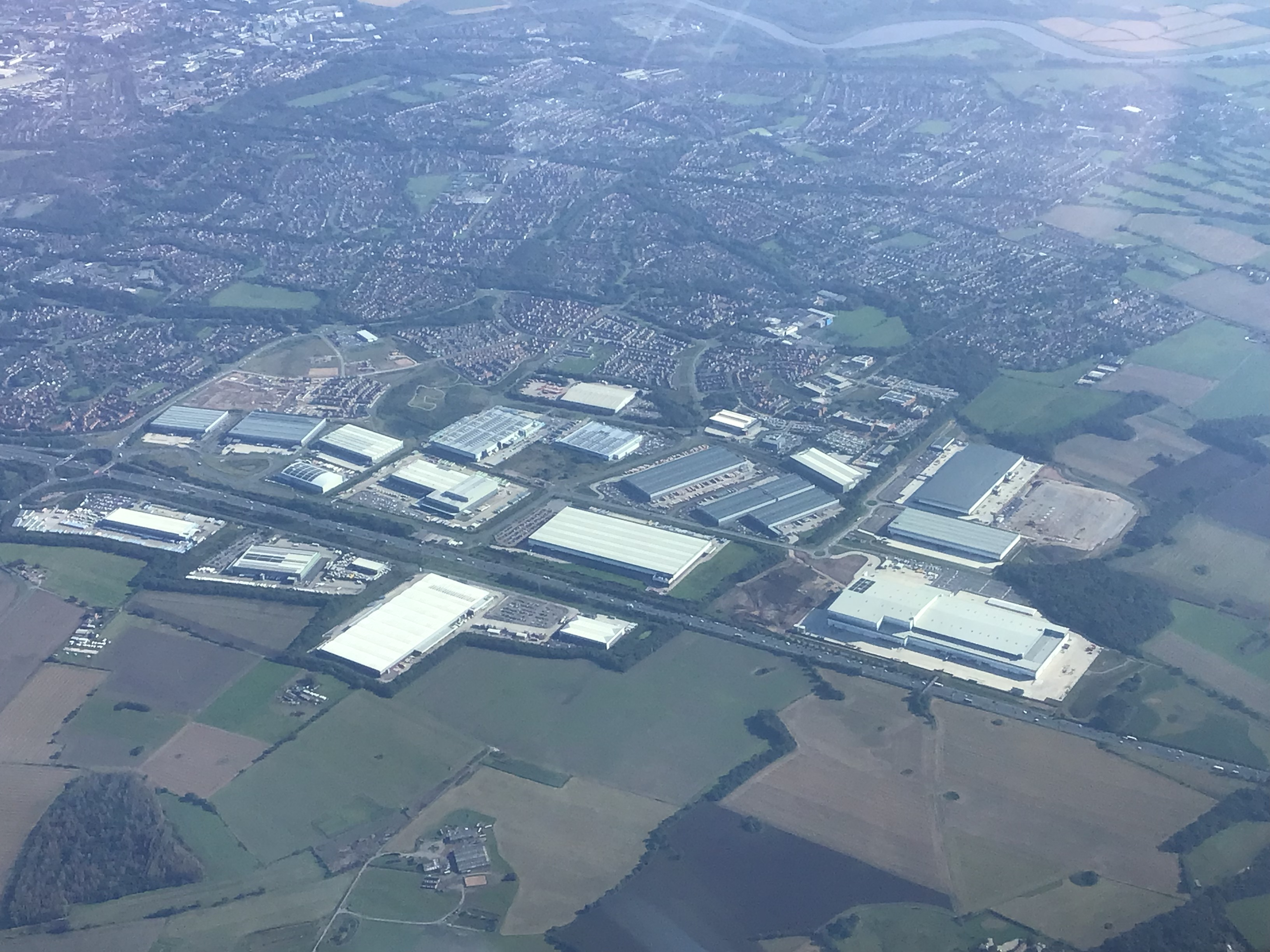
- The site of RAF Burtonwood (2024)

- Ut aquilae volent (Latin for 'That eagles may fly')

Site information
- Type: RAF station (US Visiting Forces)
- Owner: Ministry of Defence
- Operator: RAF (1940–1942, 1946–1948 & 1965–1967); US Army Air Forces (1942–1946); US Air Force (1948–1965); US Army (1967–1994)
- Condition: Closed

Location
- Shown within Cheshire RAF Burtonwood (the United Kingdom)
- Coordinates: 53.414°N 2.651°W

Site history
- Built: 1938–1940
- In use: 1940–1994
- Fate: Buildings demolished and site sold for redevelopment, including Omega Business Park and junction 8 of the M62 motorway.

Airfield information
- Identifiers: ICAO: EGOB
Runways
Direction	Length and surface
04/22	1,280 metres (4,199 ft)
09/27	2,743 metres (8,999 ft)
15/33	1,295 metres (4,249 ft)

Royal Air Force Burtonwood (or RAF Burtonwood) is a former Royal Air Force and United States Army Air Forces station that was located in Burtonwood, 2 miles (3.2 km) Northwest of Warrington in Cheshire, England. The base was opened in 1940 in response to the Second World War by the RAF and in 1942 it was transferred to the United States of America for war operations.

The base was home to 18,000 American servicemen at the end of the war. In 1946 the base was transferred back to the United Kingdom however United States operations continued. The base officially closed in 1991 and since then the runway and most of the associated buildings have been demolished. RAF Burtonwood Heritage Centre was opened on part of the former base and focuses on the lives of the servicemen, the war and the airplanes at the base.

== Overview ==
Burtonwood airfield was opened on 1 January 1940 as a servicing and storage centre for modifying British aircraft. It was operated by No. 37 Maintenance Unit RAF until June 1942.

== United States Army Air Forces use ==
The facility was transferred to the United States Army Air Forces in June 1942 to become a servicing centre for the United States Eighth, Ninth, Twelfth and Fifteenth Air Forces aircraft. Burtonwood was also known as Base Air Depot 1 (BAD 1), although an RAF presence continued in the form of the RAF Police who maintained security on the site until the mid-1960s.

Burtonwood was the largest airfield in Europe during the war with the most USAAF personnel and aircraft maintenance facilities. The roar of the engines in the test beds could be heard for miles around, especially at night. By the end of the war 18,000 servicemen were stationed at Burtonwood.

According to some sources Burtonwood was placed strategically so that it was out of range of Luftwaffe bombers, but this is not true, as several Nazi air raids were made on the facility. In any case the Luftwaffe bombed Belfast in 1941, which was much further away from Occupied Europe than Burtonwood. During their leave periods, American servicemen from Burtonwood virtually took over the centre of nearby Warrington.

USAAF Station Units assigned to RAF Burtonwood were:

- 27th Air Transport Group (302d Transport Wing, VIII Air Force Service Command)

310th, 311th, 312th Ferry Squadrons; 320th, 321st Air Transport Squadrons

- 325th Service Group (US Strategic Air Forces Service Command)

328th, 343d Service Squadron; HHS 325th Service Group

- 401st Air Depot (US Strategic Air Forces Service Command)

HHS 401st Air Depot

- Base Air Depot 1, US Strategic Air Forces

Maintenance Division; Hq, Base Air Depot Area, US Strategic Air Forces

- 18th Weather Squadron
- 91st Station Complement Squadron
- 97th Airdrome Squadron
- 1518th Quartermaster Battalion
- 494th Anti-Aircraft Artillery Gun Battalion
- 1109th Quartermaster Company
- 1289th and 890th Military Police Companies
- 1716th Ordnance Medium Maintenance Company
- 1985th, 2073d, 2097th, 2188th, 2192d, 2194th, 2224th Quartermaster Truck Companies
- 892nd Signal Depot Company
- 2000th and 2001st Engineer Fire Fighting Platoons
- 20th Medical Supply Platoon
- 14th Veterinary Section
- 55th Field Hospital

=== Sub-stations ===
The USAAF units based here also supported a number of sub-sites spread across the United Kingdom.

== United States Air Force use ==
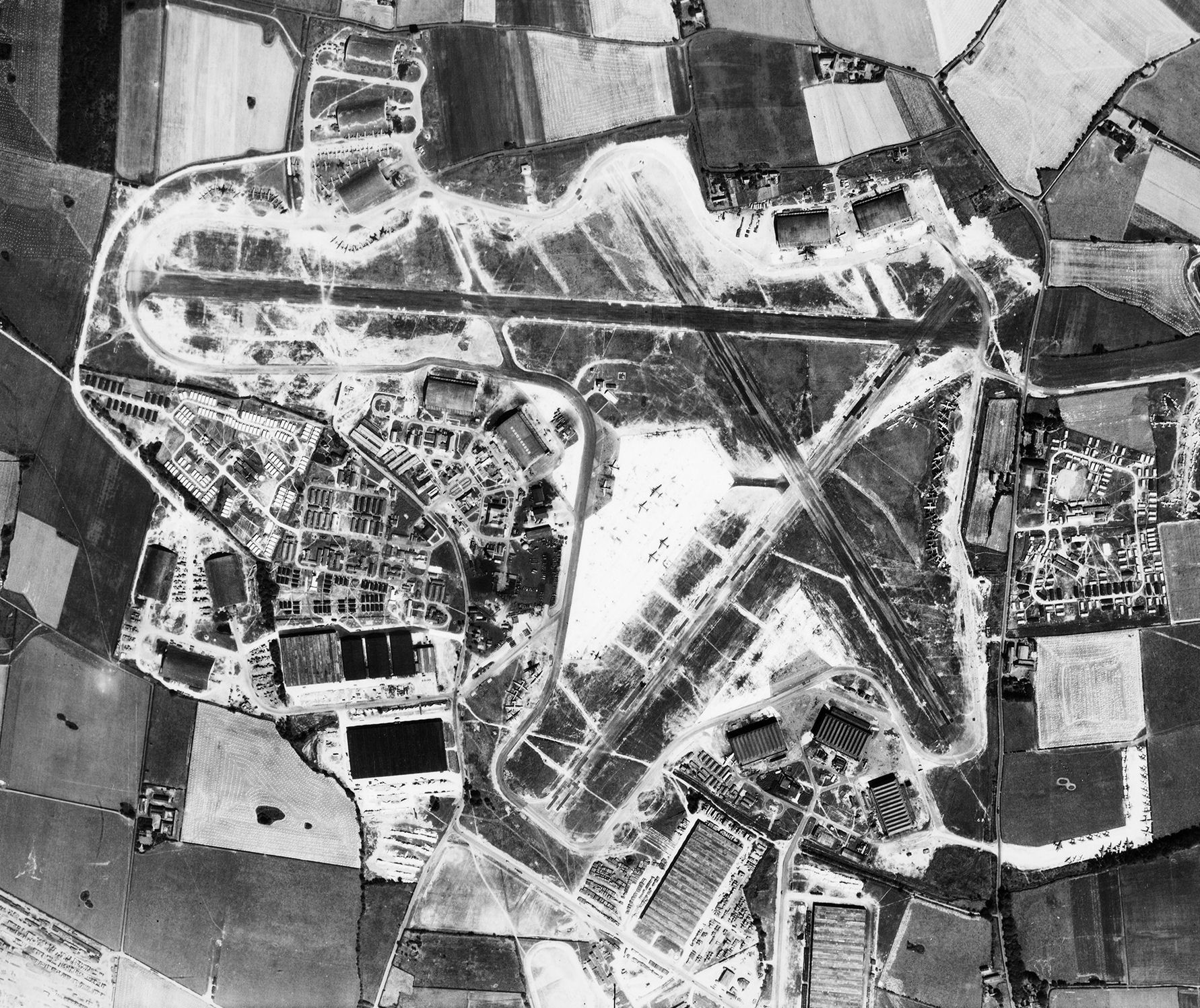
Aerial photograph of RAF Burtonwood on 10 August 1945.

When hostilities ended, control of Burtonwood was returned to the RAF in June 1946 and became an equipment depot operated by No 276 Maintenance Unit.

In November 1946 six Boeing B-29 Superfortress bombers from the USAAF Strategic Air Command 43d Bombardment Group were sent to Burtonwood, and from there to various bases in West Germany as a "training deployment". In May 1947 additional B-29s were deployed to Burtonwood to keep up the presence of a training programme. This so-called training programme was in fact a cover story, intended to conceal their actual mission i.e. to have a strategic air force permanently stationed in Europe. The American presence continued with an echelon of United States Air Force personnel using the facility as a maintenance base for Douglas C-54 Skymasters used during the Berlin Airlift.

On 7 November 1953 the USAF 53rd Weather Reconnaissance Squadron began operating from the base flying initially the WB-29 then WB-50D Superfortress, having been transferred from Kindley Field, Bermuda. The squadron was assigned to collecting weather data that was transmitted to weather stations for use in preparing forecasts required for the Air Force Military Air Transport Service (MATS) and the US Weather Bureau. The squadron was transferred to RAF Alconbury in Cambridgeshire on 26 April 1959.

MATS also used Burtonwood as a cargo and passenger transport facility until 1958, when its operations were moved to RAF Mildenhall in Suffolk. Transatlantic transport flights through the base were operated by Douglas C-54, Douglas C-118, Douglas C-124, Douglas C-133 Cargomaster and Lockheed C-130 aircraft. During the 1950s, European-based USAF aircraft were overhauled or modified at Burtonwood, including Republic F-84 Thunderjets, F-84F Thunderstreaks and North American F-86 Sabres.

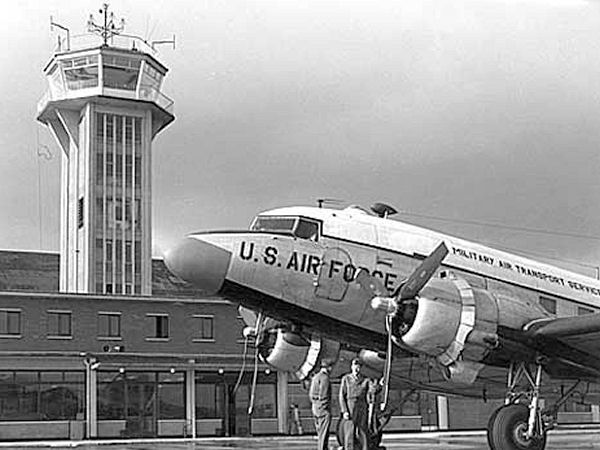
The Control Tower at RAF Burtonwood in 1954.

A small village was built, with its own school and shop, to house the many US servicemen. The buildings were known as "Tobacco Houses", because the lease for the land was paid with American tobacco.

Major USAF use of Burtonwood ended in April 1959 when the flightline was closed although some use of the runway was made by gliders of the RAF Air Training Corps (635 Gliding School ran weekend training throughout the year and longer courses during school holidays). For several years the facility fell into disuse and the USAF returned the station to the Ministry of Defence in 1965. During the 1970s the US Army continued to use Burtonwood for operations of transiting DHC-1 Beavers and there was usually at least one Bell UH-1 Iroquois helicopter based there, making regular appearances at Liverpool (Speke) airport in the early 1970s.

In the 1970s and 1980s, the area was used extensively by Territorial Army and Cadet units for training purposes. The site was also used by the MoD for civil contingency and emergency planning exercises, EOD exercises for Police as well as Fire and Rescue training.

In 2009 the final bunkers were demolished. However, the scars of the bunkers and runways can still be seen from the M62 motorway. As of 2015 new construction has obliterated the former traces of the bunkers.

== African-Americans based in Burtonwood ==
There were approximately 46,000 American GIs in Britain during the early 50s, largely based in East Anglia and at Burtonwood. During this period there were growing anxieties about female sexuality, and 'public concern became especially pronounced after the arrival of American troops during the summer and autumn of 1942'. There was increased attention to the behaviour of young girls that would loiter around the army bases like Burtonwood and spend time with the American troops. Illegitimacy rates went up during the war years and there was great social concern about preserving the British national identity. However, this became more of an issue when these young women were involved in relationships with black American soldiers. Women were given the central role and criticised for their sexual impropriety when the soldier was white; however, when the relationship involved an African-American soldier, the blame and criticism was shifted to the man. Women were portrayed as vulnerable to these men and there were social concerns about how "half-caste" babies 'threatened to blur the racial lineaments of British national identity.'

Venessa Baird, born in April 1958 to a Liverpudlian mother and Black GI based at Burtonwood airfield, is one of many mixed-race babies that came of the interracial relationships between British women and African-American troops during World War II. Baird's father did not know about her birth, and her mother's father was extremely disapproving, so Baird's mother and grandmother left Liverpool and moved to Norwich where they had friends in relationships with African American at Lakenheath and Mildenhall. Baird explains how there was a small and accepting community at USAF bases and the women that had met African-American men were good friends and formed a 'large extended family' with their mixed-race children.

== United States Army use ==
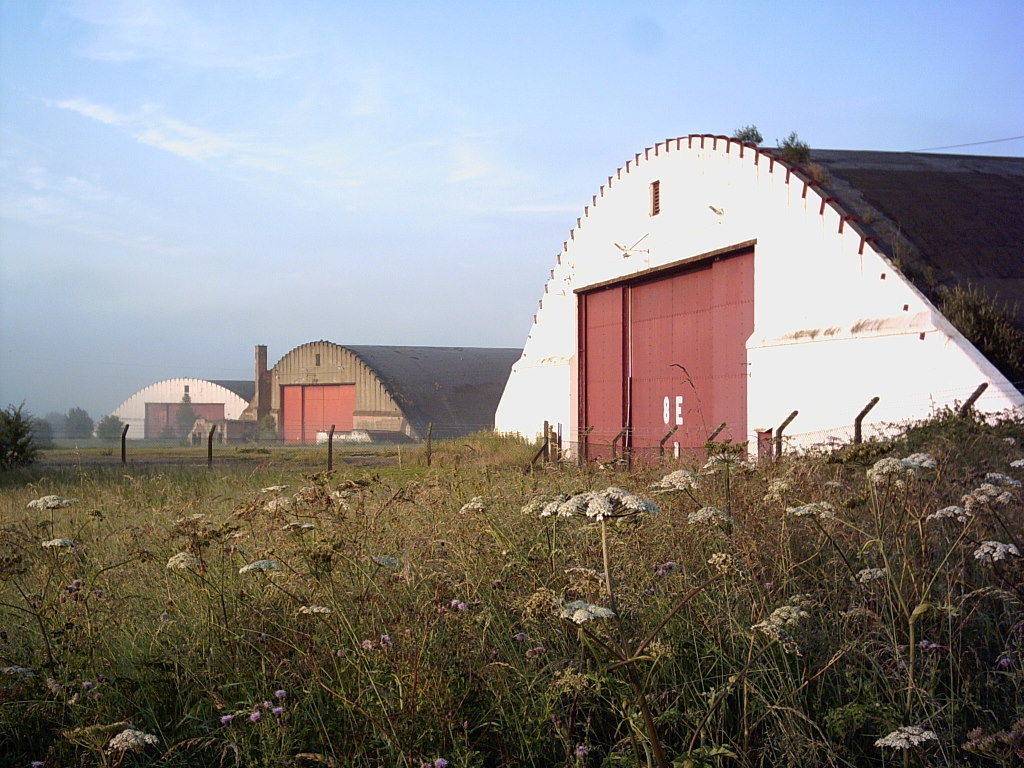
Storage bunkers at the former Burtonwood Airfield

The U.S. Department of Defense returned to Burtonwood in 1966 when France withdrew its military support for NATO. Burtonwood was used as a receiving depot for USAF and United States Army equipment and supplies being withdrawn from their former French NATO facilities. Afterwards, the US Army took over the base and renamed it Burtonwood Army Depot.

The Army developed Burtonwood into a storage and forward supply depot operated by the 47th Support Group. The main warehouse was described as the largest building under a single roof in Europe. The idea was that in the event of an emergency, U.S. troops in the USA that were earmarked for NATO service in Europe would fly over and pick up their kit from Burtonwood before going on to the battle front. It was never tested for this eventuality, although the base provided service functions for the 1991 Gulf War.

When the Cold War ended, Burtonwood Army Depot was declared excess to NATO requirements and was closed in June 1994.

== Runways ==
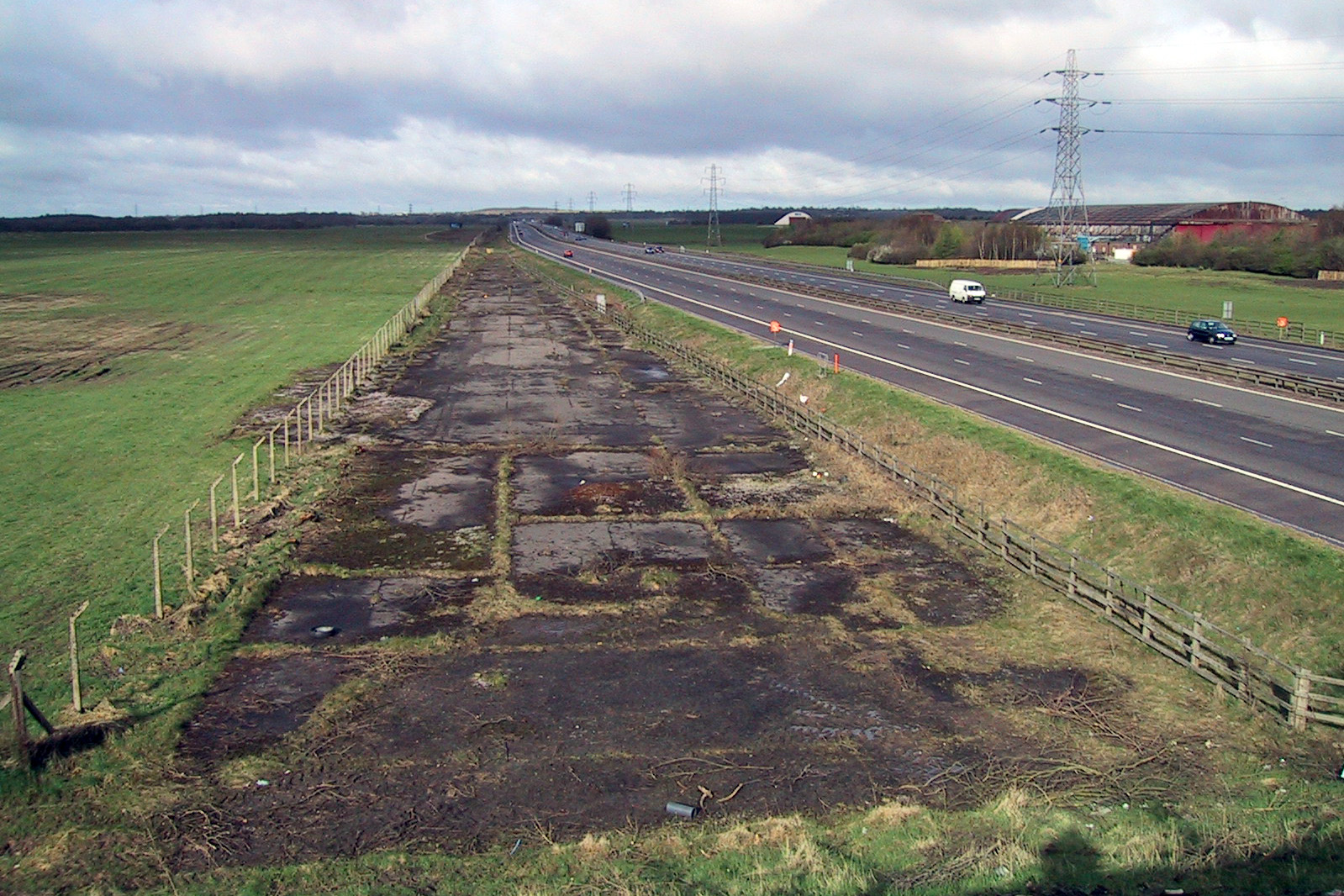
The last part of the old main runway (now covered by junction 8)

The M62 motorway bisects the airfield in an east–west direction over the former main runway 09/27. Before junction 8 was made, the last part of this runway was still visible, but is now covered by Junction 8. Part of the airfield is also occupied by the motorway Welcome Break Burtonwood service station. The other two runways had orientation 03/21 and 14/32.

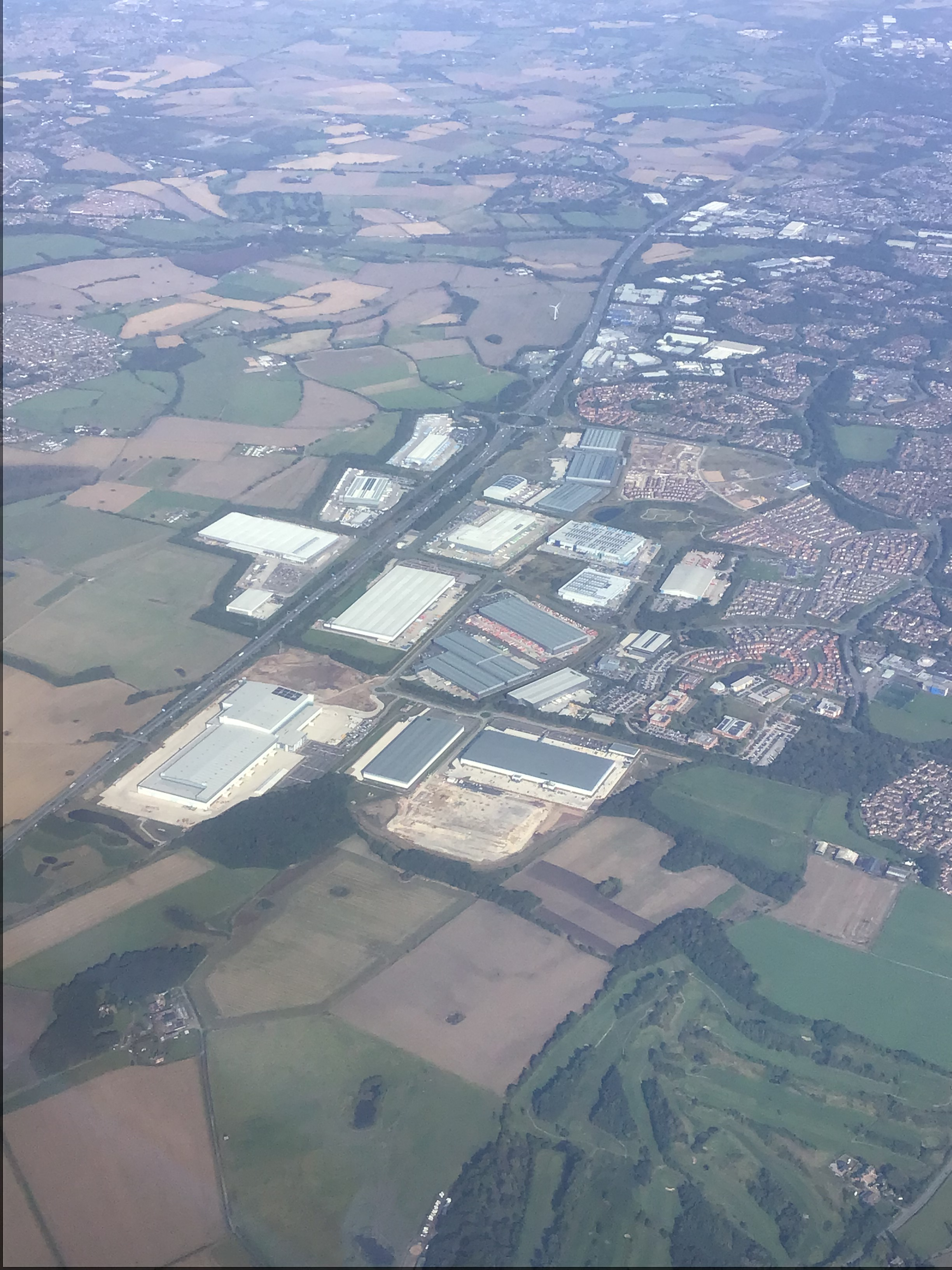
The site of RAF Burtonwood, 2024. The overlay of the M62 Motorway across the former east-west runway can be clearly seen.

== Later use ==
In late 2008 and early 2009 the remaining buildings were demolished over four months (the storage bunkers pictured in this article). This left some of the World War II aircraft hardstands, part of the old airfield perimeter track, and the northwest end of a secondary runway still visible.

During 2016 the rest of the airfield was dismantled and a new industrial estate was built on its former aerodrome. The main road through the new estate is called Skyline Drive.

The Royal Mail building is still in use (as of 2008) and dates back to when it was on the base and having been built prior to 1945. It is the only building left from the base still standing.

== RAF Burtonwood Heritage Centre ==
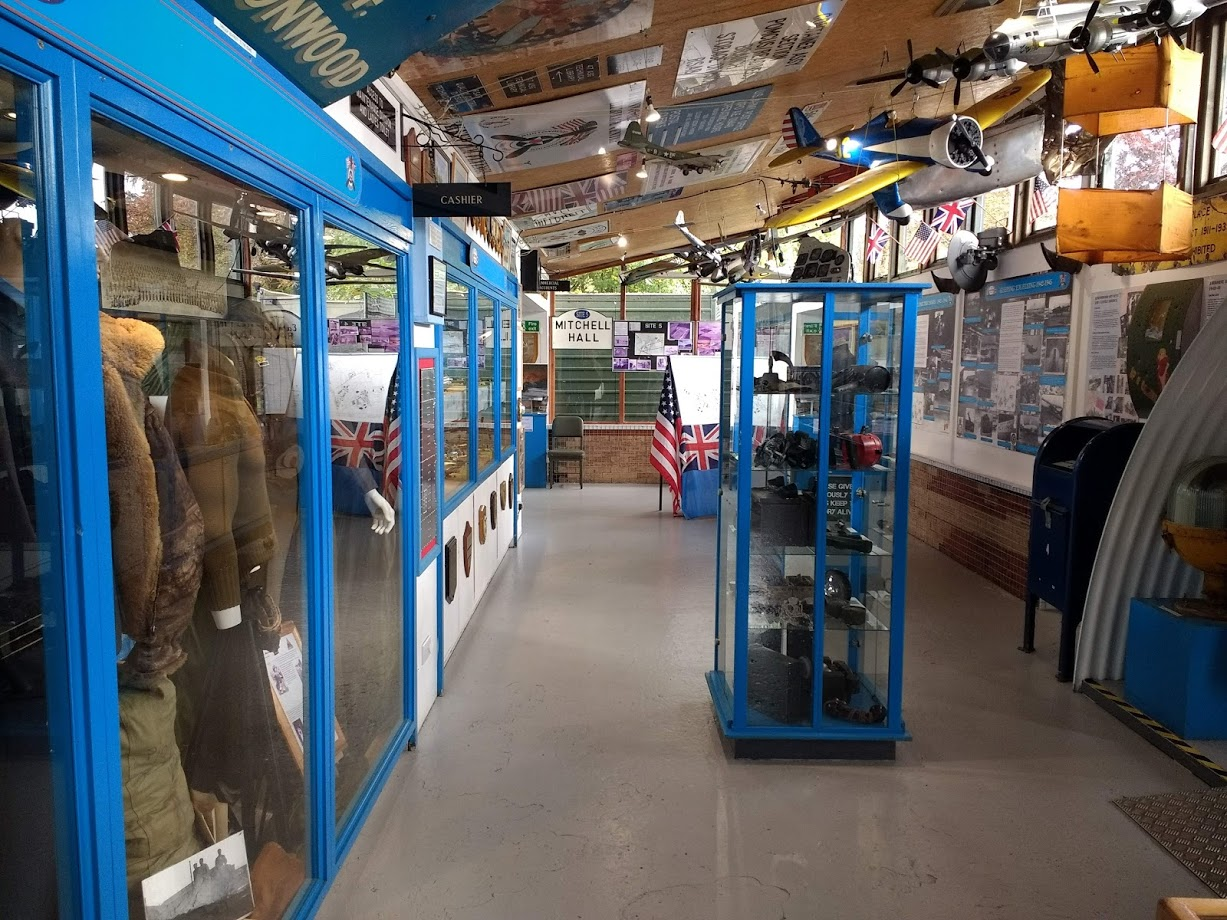
Indoor exhibits at the RAF Burtonwood Heritage Centre

A museum and heritage centre exists on part of the former site. The centre is located at the Gulliver's World theme park in Warrington.

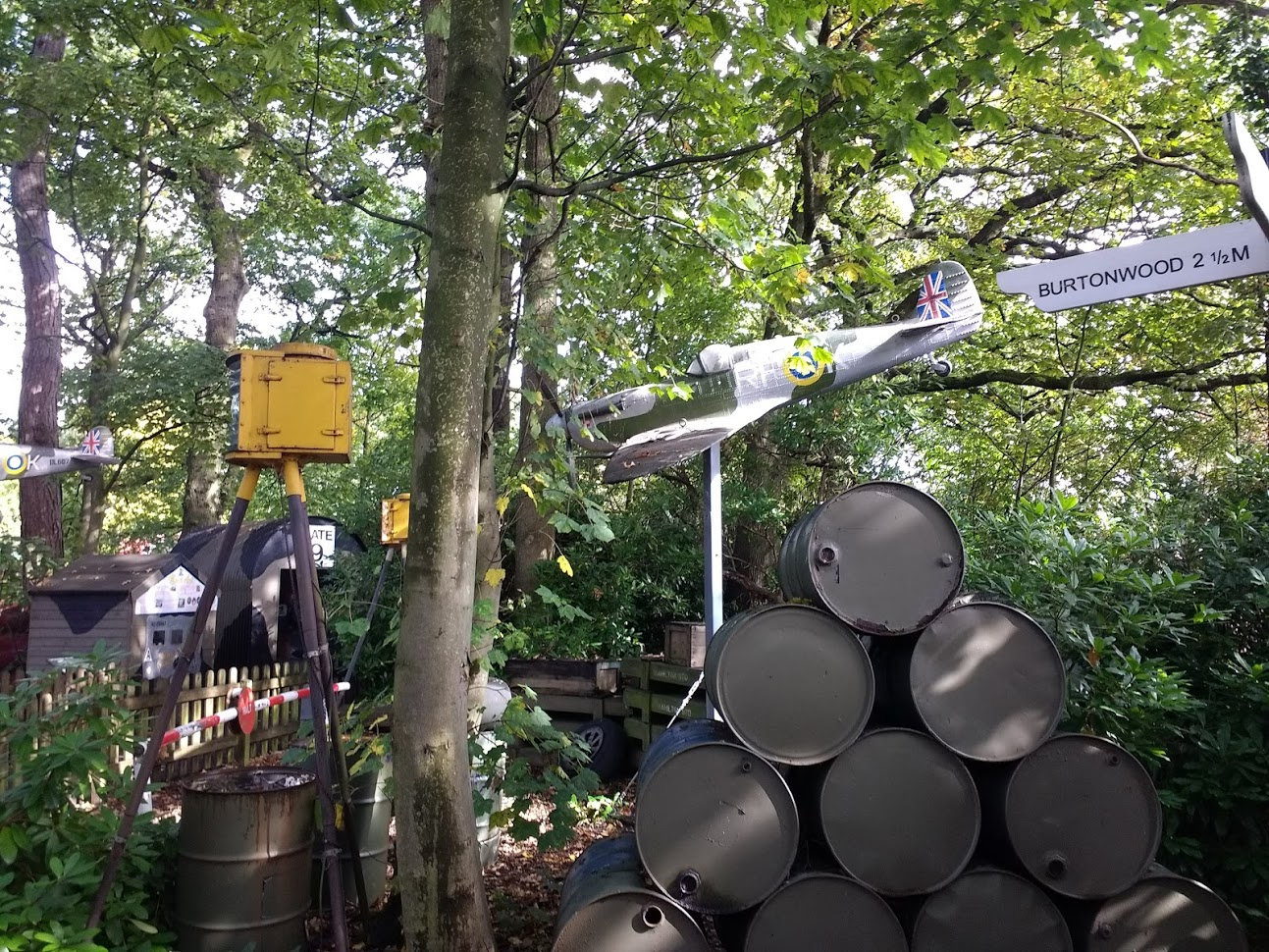
Outdoor exhibits at the RAF Burtonwood Heritage Centre.

There are five exhibit areas focussing on the living history of Burtonwood; GI brides; planes of RAF Burtonwood; entertainment and personal stories; and everyday life. The planes exhibited are the Boeing B-17 Flying Fortress, Republic P-47 Thunderbolt and the Boeing B-29 Superfortress. There is also a selection of Pratt & Whitney Wasp series engines.

== See also ==
- List of former Royal Air Force stations
- RNAS Stretton
- Bathpalathang Airport, which took over use of the IATA code BUT
