= Transport in Warrington =

There are various modes of transport available in Warrington.

== Rail ==
Warrington has seven railway stations within its boundaries. The town has two main railway stations, Bank Quay on the London to Glasgow and Chester – Warrington – Newton-le-Willows – Manchester lines, and Central on the Liverpool – Widnes – Manchester line and the Transpennine route. Bank Quay is much altered, but Central (built 1873) is of some architectural merit, featuring polychromatic brickwork. However, both main railway stations have suffered from years of under investment. A new entrance and concourse has been built at Bank Quay, and similar work started in July 2010 at Central station. There are also stations in the suburbs at Warrington West, Sankey, Glazebrook, Padgate and Birchwood.

=== Routes through Bank Quay ===
Warrington Bank Quay, to the south-west of Warrington's town centre, is between Crewe and Preston on the West Coast Main Line from London Euston and Birmingham New Street to Glasgow and Edinburgh, with services operated by Avanti West Coast. There are also regional trains from Manchester to Chester and North Wales, from Chester to Leeds, and to Liverpool with one daily service to Ellesmere Port. Arpley and Walton Sidings nearby are a major rail freight interchange, and connect the main line to the freight line to Ditton Junction, which served Fiddlers Ferry Power Station until its closure, crossing the main line under Bank Quay station, where there were once low level platforms.

=== Routes through Central ===
Central station has local services to Liverpool and Manchester and express services from Liverpool to Manchester then to Sheffield and beyond.

The trains departing Central serve the urban-rural fringe of Warrington and Manchester, serving Birchwood, Padgate, Irlam etc. before heading into Manchester. To the west, some trains serve Warrington West Station before heading into Merseyside and Liverpool. Beyond Manchester, the hourly East Midlands Railway train serves Manchester and then heads to Sheffield, Nottingham and Norwich.

The station has an average daytime frequency of four trains per hour (three local trains operated by Northern and one fast train to Norwich (East Midlands Railway).

=== History ===
The first railway to reach Warrington was the Warrington and Newton Railway in 1831, which connected to the Liverpool and Manchester Railway. Later, the Grand Junction Railway provided a connection to Birmingham and thence to London.

By 1900 the local rail network was complete, with the London and North Western Railway having 3 routes

- North to South (Carlisle-Preston-Warrington Bank Quay-Crewe-London)
- East to West (Manchester-Warrington Bank Quay (low level)-Ditton Junction-Liverpool
- Warrington Bank Quay to Chester and North Wales

and the Cheshire Lines Committee having one route from Liverpool Central via Warrington Central to Manchester Central. There was also a line avoiding Warrington Central (closed in 1968).

The Warrington Bank Quay low level route was closed to regular passenger traffic in 1962. Occasional freight services continue on the Ditton Junction-Warrington section but the line east towards Manchester has been closed and converted into the Trans-Pennine Trail.

Former stations in the Warrington area include

- closed 1949 – Sankey Bridges
- 1950 – Fidler's Ferry and Penketh
- 1954 – Warrington Arpley
- 1962 – Heatley and Warburton, Lymm, Latchford, Thelwall

== Buses ==
The town and its districts are fairly well served by bus services. Warrington's Own Buses is the main provider of services, operating most of the day time bus routes. Arriva North West, Stagecoach Manchester. National Express also operate their long-distance services through Warrington. Most services that serve Warrington depart from and arrive at Warrington Interchange. However services can be caught from various points around the town centre, principally Rylands Street (for South and Eastbound routes), Academy Way (Inbound and Eastbound routes), Warrington Central for Northbound services, Sankey Street for Westbound, Eastbound and Southbound buses.

Daytime route table
Route Number	Route Summary	Direction	Mon – Sat Frequency	Sunday Frequency	Route
1	Warrington – Westy Circular	Southbound	30 mins	60 mins	Warrington, Knutsford Road, Latchford, Westy, Manchester Road, Warrington
2	Warrington – Westy Circular	Eastbound	30 mins	60 mins	The reverse of route 1
3	Warrington – Martinscroft	Eastbound	30 mins	30 mins	Warrington, Paddington, Woolston, Manchester Road, Martinscroft
4	Warrington – Woolston	Eastbound	30 mins	No service	Warrington, Paddington, Woolston
5	Warrington – Altrincham	Southbound	60 mins	60 mins	Warrington, Bank Quay Rail (most), Centre Park (most), Stockton Heath, Grappenhall, Thelwall, Statham, Lymm, Warburton (some), Dunham, Altrincham
5A	Warrington – Altrincham	Southbound	60 mins	See CAT5	As service CAT5, but serves Partington and Broadheath instead of Warburton and Dunham
6	Warrington – Grappenhall Circular	Southbound	30 mins	60 mins (to Cobbs Estate)	Warrington, Bank Quay Rail (most), Centre Park (most), Stockton Heath, Cobbs Estate, Grappenhall East View
7	Warrington – Liverpool	Westbound	30 mins	30 mins	Warrington, Penketh, Cronton, Huyton, Broadgreen, Edge Hill, Liverpool
7	Warrington – Appleton Thorn	Southbound	120 mins	No service	Warrington, Bank Quay Rail (most), Centre Park (most), Stockton Heath, Cobbs Estate, Pewterspear, Dudlows Green, Appleton Thorn
8	Warrington – Appleton Thorn – Hatton (some)	Southbound	120 mins	No service	Warrington, Bank Quay Rail (most), Centre Park (most), Stockton Heath, Cobbs Estate, Appleton Thorn, Stretton (some), Hatton (some)
8A	Warrington – Appleton Thorn – Hatton	Southbound	Infrequent	No service	As service CAT8 but via Lyons Lane and New Lane, operating at school times only
9	Warrington – Northwich	Southbound	120 mins	No service	Warrington, Bank Quay Rail (most), Centre Park (most), Stockton Heath, Stretton, Antrobus (some), Comberbach, Budworth, Wincham, Lostock Gralam, Northwich
9A	Warrington – Northwich	Southbound	120 mins	No service	Warrington, Bank Quay Rail (most), Centre Park (most), Stockton Heath, Stretton, Antrobus, Comberbach, Anderton, Barnton, Northwich
9B	Warrington – Hatton	Southbound	Infrequent	No service	Warrington, Bank Quay Rail (most), Centre Park (most), Stockton Heath, Stretton, Hatton
11	Warrington – Lower Walton Circular	Southbound	30 mins	No service	Warrington, Knutsford Road, Latchford, Westy, Loushers Lane, Gainsborough Road, Lower Walton, Warrington
12	Warrington – Lower Walton Circular	Southbound	30 mins	No service	The reverse of route 11
13	Warrington – Omega Business Park	Westbound	30 mins	No service	Warrington, Hood Manor, Chapelford, Whittle Hall, Omega Business Park
14	Warrington – Sankey Circular	Westbound	60 mins	60 mins	Warrington, Hood Manor, Sankey Station, Lingley Green, Meeting Lane, Penketh Lane Ends, Warrington
15	Warrington – Sankey Circular	Westbound	60 mins	No service	The reverse of route 14
16	Warrington – Dallam	Westbound	30 mins	30 mins (on 16/20^{A}/21^{A})	Warrington, General Hospital, Folly Lane, Dallam
16^{A}	Warrington – Dallam	Westbound	30 mins	See 16/20^{A}/21^{A}	As service 16, but serves Troutbeck Avenue
17 – Connect17	Callands – Warrington – Birchwood	West/eastbound	15 mins (westbound); 30 mins (eastbound)	60 mins (to Callands)	Warrington, Gemini, Callands, Westbrook, Old Hall, Warrington, Paddington, Fearnhead, Birchwood, Oakwood
17^{A} – Connect17	Callands – Warrington – Birchwood	East/westbound	Infrequent	See 17	As service 17, but additionally serves Birchwood Park
17^{C} – Connect17	Callands – Warrington – Birchwood	East/westbound	Infrequent	See 17	As service 17, but serves Birchwood Park instead of Birchwood Centre
18	Burtonwood – Warrington – Priestley College	Westbound	Infrequent	See 17	Burtonwood, Callands, Westbrook, Old Hall, Warrington, Priestley College
19	Warrington – Leigh	Northbound	60 mins	60 mins (to Culcheth)	Warrington, Winwick, Croft, Culcheth, Glazebury, Leigh; Occasionally continues to or starts from Priestley College
20 – The Pops	Warrington – Orford Circular	Northbound	10 mins	60 mins	Warrington, Winwick Rd, Orford Park Centre, Longford, Orford, Warrington
21 – The Pops	Warrington – Longford Circular	Northbound	10 mins	60 mins	Warrington, Orford, Longford, Orford Park Centre, Winwick Road, Warrington
22	Warrington – Earlestown – Vulcan – Ashton-in-Makerfield	Northbound	60 mins	See 22^{A}	Warrington, Winwick, Newton-le-Willows, Earlestown, Vulcan, Ashton-in-Makerfield
22^{A}	Warrington – Earlestown – Wigan (most)	Northbound	See 22	60 mins	As service 22 to Earlestown, then most continue to Newton-le-Willows, Golborne, Abram, Platt Bridge and Wigan
25	Warrington – Gorse Covert	Eastbound	30 mins	See 26/27	Warrington, Ryfields Village (some), Orford, Orange Grove (some), Cinnamon Brow, Birchwood, Oakwood, Gorse Covert; Occasionally continues to or starts from Priestley College
28	Warrington – Leigh	Eastbound	60 mins	See 28^{A}	Warrington, Paddington, Padgate, Longbarn, Birchwood, Locking Stumps, Risley, Culcheth, Glazebury, Leigh
28^{A}	Warrington – Leigh	Eastbound	Peak only	60 mins	As service 28, but omits Birchwood
32	Warrington – Widnes	Westbound	15 mins 20 mins on Sats	60 mins to Penketh only	Warrington, Sankey Bridges, Penketh, Tannery Lane (some), Cuerdley, Widnes
39	School service to Lymm High School	Eastbound	Infrequent	No service	Grappenhall, Lymm High School
40	School service to Lymm High School	Eastbound	Infrequent	No service	Stretton, Stockton Heath, Grappenhall, Lymm High School
40^{B}	School service to Lymm High School	Eastbound	Infrequent	No service	Martinscroft, Hollins Green, Latchford Locks, Lymm High School
41	School service to Lymm High School	Eastbound	Infrequent	No service	Walton, Grappenhall, Lymm High School; Stanton Road, Lymm High School
41^{A}	School service to Lymm High School	Eastbound	Infrequent	No service	Stanton Road, Lymm High School
42	School service to Lymm High School	Eastbound	Infrequent	No service	Grappenhall Heys, Appleton Thorn, Grappenhall, Lymm High School
42^{A}	School service to Lymm High School	Eastbound	Infrequent	No service	Warrington, Knutsford Road, Lymm High School
47	Warrington – Lymm – High Legh – Knutsford	Southbound	Infrequent	No service	Warrington (some), Latchford (some), Grappenhall (some), Lymm, Broomedge, High Legh, Knutsford (some)
48	Northwich – Frodsham	Not applicable	120 mins Not Weds	No service	Northwich, Weaverham, Acton Bridge, Hatchmere, Kingsley, Frodsham
48^{A}	Northwich – Frodsham	Not applicable	120 mins Weds only	No service	As service 48, but serving Delamere Park instead of Acton Bridge
62	Warrington – Runcorn – Widnes – Halebank	Southbound	60 mins	60 mins	Warrington, Stockton Heath, Walton, Moore, Murdishaw, Halton Lea, Runcorn, Widnes, Halebank
62^{A}	Warrington – Runcorn – Widnes – Halebank	Southbound	Peak only	See 62	As service 62, but serves Daresbury Technology Park instead of Moore
100	Warrington – Shudehill	East/westbound	60 mins	60 mins	Warrington – Hollins Green – Trafford Centre – Eccles – Salford Shopping Centre – Shudehill
110	Warrington – Murdishaw-Windmill Hill	Westbound	15 mins 20 mins on Sats	30 mins	Warrington, Penketh Lane Ends, Penketh, Widnes, Runcorn, Halton Lea, Murdishaw, (Whitehouse – peak only), (Windmill Hill – Sun only)
329	Warrington – Saint Helens	Northbound	30 mins	30 mins	Warrington, Winwick, Burtonwood, Collins Green, Parr, Saint Helens
329	Warrington – Saint Helens	Northbound	60 mins	No service	Warrington, Winwick, Burtonwood, Collins Green, Parr, Saint Helens
360	Warrington – Wigan	Northbound	30 mins	No service	Warrington, Winwick, Newton-le-Willows, Golborne, Wigan
X30	Warrington – Chester	Southbound	60 mins	No service	Warrington, Walton, Daresbury, Halton Lea, Frodsham, Helsby, Chester
Evening route table
Route Number	Route Summary	Direction	Mon – Sat Evening Frequency	Sun Evening Frequency	Route
1	Warrington – Westy Circular	Southbound	60 mins	No service	Warrington, Knutsford Road, Latchford, Westy
3	Warrington – Martinscroft	Eastbound	60 mins	No service	Warrington, Paddington, Woolston, Manchester Road, Martinscroft
5	Warrington – Lymm	Southbound	120 mins	No service	Warrington, Stockton Heath, Cobbs Estate, Grappenhall, Thelwall, Statham, Lymm
7	Warrington – Liverpool	Westbound	60 mins	60 mins	Warrington, Penketh, Cronton, Huyton, Broadgreen, Edge Hill, Liverpool
8	Warrington – Appleton Thorn	Southbound	120 mins	No service	Warrington, Stockton Heath, Cobbs Estate, Appleton Thorn
14	Warrington – Sankey	Westbound	60 mins	No service	Warrington, Hood Manor, Sankey Station, Lingley Green, Meeting Lane, Penketh Lane Ends, Warrington
16	Warrington – Dallam	Westbound	60 mins	No service	Warrington, General Hospital, Folly Lane, Dallam
17	Warrington – Callands	Westbound	60 mins	No service	Warrington, Old Hall, Westbrook, Callands
22^{A}	Warrington – Earlestown – Wigan	Northbound	60 mins	No service	Warrington, Winwick Road, Orford Park Centre, Winwick, Newton-le-Willows, Earlestown, Newton-le-Willows, Golborne, Abram, Platt Bridge, Wigan
27^{E}	Warrington – Cinnamon Brow	Eastbound	60 mins	No service	Warrington, Orford, Padgate, Cinnamon Brow
28A	Warrington – Leigh	Eastbound	60 mins	No service	Warrington, Paddington, Padgate, Longbarn, Locking Stumps, Birchwood, Gorse Covert, Risley, Culcheth, Glazebury, Leigh
32	Warrington – Penketh	Westbound	60 mins	No service	Warrington, Sankey Bridges, Penketh
110	Warrington – Runcorn Windmill Hill	Westbound	60 mins	60 mins	Warrington, Penketh Lane Ends, Penketh, Widnes, Runcorn, Halton Lea, Murdishaw, Windmill Hill
Notes: First buses are those leaving either Bewsey Road Depot, (in the case of Warrington’s Own Buses) Arriva Runcorn for the 110 and the x30 to the Town Centre, to start the full route.; Last buses are those leaving the outer terminus on linear routes, or arriving into Warrington on circulars; some last buses terminate elsewhere in the town centre, e.g. Garven Place.; A red background in the route number column denotes routes normally operated by Warrington's Own Buses; A yellow background in the route number column denotes routes normally operated by Stagecoach Manchester/Bee Network; A teal background in the route number column denotes routes normally operated by Arriva North West; A green background in the route number column denotes routes operated by Link Network

== Roads ==
There are three key motorways serving the town and surrounding areas. The town is located roughly halfway between Liverpool and Manchester.

The M6 has four junctions in Warrington. Junction 20 serves the rural south-eastern outskirts of Warrington (i.e. Lymm, Grappenhall, Appleton Thorn and Hatton), it also acts as the "Lymm Interchange" for the M56. Junction 21 serves Woolston, Padgate, Birchwood and the town centre. Junction 21A is the "Croft Interchange" for the M62. Finally, junction 22 serves the north-eastern rural suburbs (i.e. Kenyon, Croft, and Culcheth). To the North, the next exit is for Haydock, to the south the next exit is for Macclesfield, Knutsford and Northwich.

The M62 also has four junctions serving Warrington. Junction 11 serves the Eastern suburbs (Birchwood, Risley, and Culcheth). Junction 10 is known as the "Croft Interchange" and links to the M6. Junction 9 serves the town centre, and inner city areas (Orford, Winwick, and Longford). Finally, junction 8 serves the western suburbs (Westbrook, Sankey and Callands). To the west, the next junction serves St. Helens, Prescot, and Widnes. Towards the east, the next junction is known as the "Eccles Interchange", linking the M60.

The third motorway skirts the south-east of Warrington, the M56 interchanges with the M6 at junction 9. Junction 10 serves the very rural outskirts of Warrington (Stretton and Hatton).

There are several A-roads serving Warrington:

- A49 (Ross-on-Wye-Preston)
- A56 (Chester-Skipton)
- A57 (Liverpool-Lincoln)
- A562 (Liverpool-Sankey)
- A572 (St. Helens-Swinton)
- A574 (Sankey-Leigh)
- A579(Winwick-Ainsworth)
- A5088
- A6144

== River ==
The River Mersey runs through the heart of the town dividing it into two. There are only two main thoroughfares crossing the Mersey in Warrington: at Bridgefoot and at the Kingsway Bridge. Another crossing is planned from Lower Walton to Arpley.

== Canals ==
Warrington is also divided by the Manchester Ship Canal but there are three swing bridges and a high-level cantilever bridge providing crossing points, and another high-level crossing is planned between Warrington and Runcorn.

The picturesque Bridgewater Canal runs through the Borough from the scenic village of Lymm to Walton Lea Gardens, a local park/leisure area.

The first modern canal is also located in Warrington. The Sankey Canal starts at Spike Island in Widnes, going through Sankey Valley Park past Bewsey Old Hall & Gullivers World theme park, on through Earlestown and ending at the old Safeway store (now Tesco) in St. Helens.

== Air ==
Although Warrington itself does not have an airport, it is within half an hour (by road) of two international airports : Liverpool John Lennon Airport and Manchester Airport, each with a mix of various international, European, domestic and regional flights. You can reach Manchester Airport by train (via Piccadilly Station in Manchester).

At one point Warrington was home to a world-famous military airfield used intensively during World War Two at Burtonwood. Now the runway is part of the M62 and the area has now been transformed into Omega business park. The old aircraft hangars, previously by the side of the M62, were demolished in 2008 and 2009.

== Cycling ==
Warrington is home to the Warrington Cycle Campaign, a cycling advocacy group that has received international attention with its 'Cycle facility of the month' feature.
