= Listed buildings in Croft, Cheshire =

Croft is a village and civil parish in the Borough of Warrington in Cheshire, England, north of the town of Warrington. It contains 13 buildings that are recorded in the National Heritage List for England as designated listed buildings. All of these are listed at Grade II, the lowest of the three gradings given to listed buildings, applied to "buildings of national importance and special interest". The parish is mainly rural, and other than a milestone its listed buildings are related to churches, houses or farms.

Name and location	Photograph	Date	Notes
Barn, Hope Farm; 53.4402°N 2.5255°W	—	Late 17th century	A three-bay barn, with an added bay to the south, it is constructed in brick with a stone-slate roof. It is partly in two storeys, but the central section is open to the roof. At the north gable, stone steps lead up to the top storey.
Eaves Brow Farmhouse; 53.4350°N 2.5433°W	—	1703 (possibly)	The farmhouse is constructed in brick with a slate roof. It is in two storeys and two bays. The windows are mullioned and transomed casements.
Well; 53.44485°N 2.54367°W	—	18th century (or earlier)	The well is circular and lined with red bricks. Above this are items used in the function of the well, including a hardwood roller and a wrought iron handle. It has a 19th-century sandstone cover with rope winding gear.
Wall, gates and gatepiers Kenyon Hall; 53.44966°N 2.57339°W	—	Early 18th century	The wall and gatepiers are in stone, with the 19th-century gates in wrought iron. There are two pairs of gatepiers, which are rusticated with hemispherical finials.
Barrow Farmhouse; 53.4539°N 2.5601°W	—	1763	A brick farmhouse with a 20th-century tiled roof. It is in three storeys and two bays, and has casement windows. The rear of the house has been rebuilt. The interior contains beams, an inglenook with a large bressumer, and a dog-leg staircase.
Springfield Farmhouse; 53.4323°N 2.5453°W	—	Late 18th century	A farmhouse built in brown brick with a stone-slate roof. It is in two storeys and three bays. The doorcase is flanked by pilasters, and above it is an open pediment and a fanlight. The windows are recessed sashes.
Newchurch Old Rectory; 53.4472°N 2.5224°W	—	1812	This originated as a rectory, and later became a private house. It is constructed in brick with a slate roof. The house is in two storeys and three bays, with a two storey, two bay south wing. Three steps, flanked by a wrought iron balustrade, lead up to the entrance, which has a Doric doorcase, above which is a fanlight and an open pediment containing a crest.
Hope Farmhouse; 53.4403°N 2.5252°W	—	Early 19th century	A brown brick farmhouse with a stone-slate roof, it is in two storeys and two bays. Above the doorway is a fanlight, and the windows are sashes.
Wigshaw House; 53.4487°N 2.5320°W	—	Early 19th century	A red brick house with a stone-slate roof, it is in two storeys and two bays. Above the doorway is a fanlight. The windows are sashes.
St Lewis' Church; 53.4444°N 2.5440°W		1826–27	A Roman Catholic church, constructed in brick with a slate roof. It has a rectangular plan with an apse. The west front has a pedimented gable and a pedimented porch. The porch contains a doorway with a fluted Doric doorcase and fanlight. Inside the church, at the east end, are four Corinthian pilasters. The plastered ceiling is flat with a large decorated rose.
St Lewis' Presbytery; 53.4444°N 2.5441°W	—	1827	Built as a residence for the priest, it is constructed in brick with a slate roof. It is in two storeys and three bays, and is continuous with the church. To the north is a two storey, two bay extension. It has a fluted Doric doorcase with a fanlight. The windows are sashes.
Christ Church; 53.4374°N 2.5433°W		1832–33	This originated as a Commissioners' church, and was designed by Edward Blore, It is constructed in sandstone with slate roofs. At the southwest corner is a steeple, incorporating a hexagonal drum in the lower part of the spire. All the windows are lancets. Inside the church is a west gallery and panels inscribed with the Creed, the Ten Commandments, and the Lord's Prayer.
Milestone; 53.43510°N 2.52650°W	—	Late 19th–early 20th century	A triangular stone milestone with a downward sloping top standing on the west side of the A574 road. It is inscribed with the distances to Culcheth, Leigh and Warrington.

== See also ==
- Listed buildings in Wigan
- Listed buildings in Culcheth and Glazebury
- Listed buildings in Birchwood
- Listed buildings in Poulton-with-Fearnhead
- Listed buildings in St Helens
- Listed buildings in Winwick
