= Poulton-with-Fearnhead =

Civil parish in Cheshire, England

Coordinates: 53.412°N 2.558°W

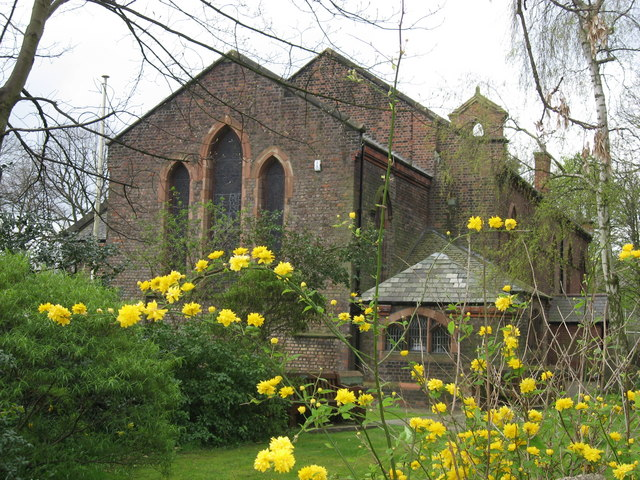
- Christchurch, Poulton with Fearnhead

- Location within Cheshire
- Population: 17,019 (2001)
- OS grid reference: SJ629907
- Civil parish: Poulton-with-Fearnhead
- Unitary authority: Warrington
- Ceremonial county: Cheshire
- Region: North West
- Country: England
- Sovereign state: United Kingdom
- Post town: WARRINGTON
- Postcode district: WA1, WA2
- Dialling code: 01925
- Police: Cheshire
- Fire: Cheshire
- Ambulance: North West
- UK Parliament: Warrington North

Poulton-with-Fearnhead, or Poulton with Fearnhead, is a civil parish in the Borough of Warrington, Cheshire, England. According to the 2001 census it had a population of 17,019. The parish includes northern and eastern suburbs of Warrington, including Padgate, Fearnhead, Cinnamon Brow, Blackbrook, Longbarn, Bruche and Paddington.

From northwards clockwise, it borders the parishes of Croft (at a point on a motorway junction), Birchwood, Woolston, the unparished area of Warrington, then the parish of Winwick.

== See also ==
- Listed buildings in Poulton-with-Fearnhead
