= Warrington Corporation Tramways =

Tramway operator in England

- Diagram map of the Warrington tramway system

Overview
- Headquarters: Warrington
- Locale: England
- Dates of operation: 1902–1935
- Successor: Abandoned

Technical
- Track gauge: 4 ft 8 1/2 in (1,435 mm)
- Length: 6.84 miles

Warrington Corporation Tramways was the owner and operator of an electric tramway system in the early 20th century serving the town of Warrington, at the time a county borough of Lancashire, England.

== History ==
=== Construction ===
The town of Warrington was already well served by railways, canals and turnpike roads when in 1880, a private company approached Warrington Corporation about the possibility of laying a horse tramway within the town. After an investigation into existing horse tramways in operation in Bristol and Hull, the corporation declined the offer, not wanting outsiders making a profit from the residents. It was not until the construction of a power generating station at Howley in 1900 that the corporation was encouraged to apply to the Board of Trade for powers to lay down and operate an electric tramway system along the five main arterial roads within the town boundary. This was granted as the Warrington Corporation Tramways Order 1900 and confirmed by the Tramways Orders Confirmation (No. 4) Act 1900 (63 & 64 Vict. c. cci). Construction began in 1901, with responsibility for the operation assumed by the corporation's Electricity and Tramways Committee under the name of "Warrington Corporation Tramways".

The official Board of Trade inspection of the Latchford and Sankey Bridges branches was made by Lt. Col. P.G. von Donop R.E. on 17 April 1902. Despite a minor hiccup involving a broken trolley pole, permission was given for operations on the two lines to begin. The first tram left Rylands Street for Latchford at 7.40 a.m. on 21 April. Operation of the Sankey Bridges route did not start for another two days until enough trams were available for service, thus a through service between the two lines commenced on 23 April. Eight open-top double-deck trams built by G. F. Milnes & Co. of Birkenhead were purchased for the opening, with a further 13 arriving later in the year to operate the other three lines. The five routes operated were as follows:

Destination	Opened	Closed	Notes
Latchford	21 April 1902	28 August 1935	
Sankey Bridges	23 April 1902	27 March 1935	
Wilderspool	4 October 1902	17 September 1931	Extended to Stockton Heath from 7 July 1905
Cemetery	22 November 1902	27 March 1935	
Longford	29 November 1902	31 December 1931	

=== South of the Ship Canal ===
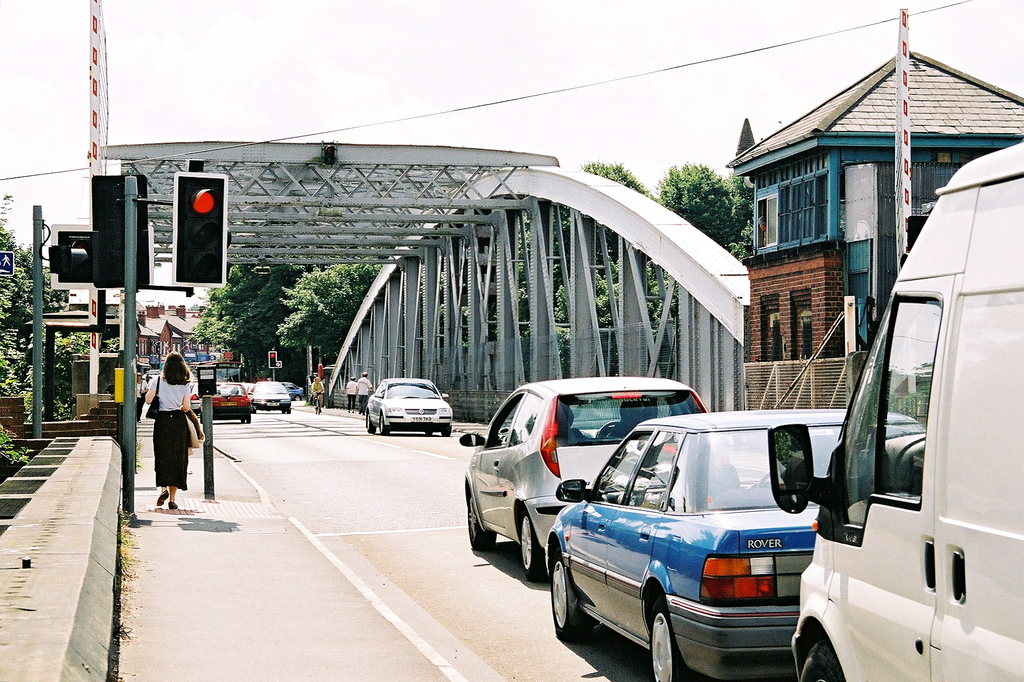
Northwich Road swing bridge on the Manchester Ship Canal over which the tramway extension to Stockton Heath operated, with the village centre visible in the background.

The line south along Wilderspool Causeway initially operated to a terminus at Stafford Road just north of the Manchester Ship Canal, being at the time the boundary between Lancashire and Cheshire. On the Cheshire side of the canal was the village of Stockton Heath, which may have been expected to provide a more suitable terminus. However, strong opposition from Stockton Heath Parish Council was encountered, so for the time being the line terminated on the Lancashire side of the canal. Alternative proposals came in 1901 from the Warrington and Northwich Light Railway (WNLR), who wished to run a tramway from Northwich to Stockton Heath and onwards to meet the Warrington Corporation Tramways system at both the Wilderspool and Latchford termini. The crossing of the Manchester Ship Canal at both locations would only be allowed by an exorbitant annual sum which made the scheme unviable, so Warrington Corporation applied for a light railway order to cover the sections north of Stockton Heath, being in a better position to press the canal company not to apply such charges. As a result, the official title of the tramway changed, with timetables and tickets amended to bear the legend "Warrington Corporation Tramways & Stockton Heath Light Railways".

As the line crossed the canal on a swing bridge, special precautions had to be made to ensure that trams did not end up in the canal whilst the bridge was out. Catch points were provided on the southern side of the canal, whilst the current in the vicinity was cut as soon as the bridge swung out of its closed position, leaving a neutral section in the overhead wires until the bridge swung back into position. A single-line spur in Stockton Heath provided for the proposed link to Northwich, and in 1906 the WNLR proposed as a first step to lay tracks as far as Stretton, with the proviso that the corporation would operate this section. The negotiations came to nothing as the WNLR were not prepared to offer a guarantee to the corporation against any losses. The powers held by the corporation to build a line between Latchford and Stockton Heath were left to lapse.

The route to Stockton Heath was the most prone to delays due to both the swing bridge across the Manchester Ship Canal as well as a level crossing over the London and North Western Railway's Garston to Timperley railway at Wilderspool, which had a similar set of precautions to prevent trams from fouling the crossing. The line was thus operated independently of the other routes. A northern spur up Bridge Street was put in at the same time as the Stockton Heath extension, so that trams could terminate there instead of causing delay to through services on Rylands Street.

=== North towards the South Lancashire system ===
The Longford route was built with the intention that there would be an onward line built by the private company South Lancashire Tramways (SLT) to Newton-le-Willows and beyond. SLT held powers to build such a route as part of the South Lancashire Tramways Act 1901 (1 Edw. 7. c. cclvii), the act also authorising SLT to enter into agreements concerning running powers with the corporation. In the meantime, the line was not expected to be viable by itself, due to the sparsely populated nature of the outer end.

SLT got into serious financial difficulties in 1904, which led to its restructuring in 1906. As a result of concentrating on building new tramways to connect with lines in other areas, the powers to build the connection to the Longford line lapsed. The Longford route thus became rather a liability to the corporation. Efforts were made to reduce the losses caused by the line such that in 1910, Tram No. 18 was converted to a single-deck one-man operated vehicle. The route still made substantial losses so was later put back into its original open-top condition, along with 19 and 21, due to restricted headroom caused by two railway bridges along the route.

Lancashire United Tramways (LUT), the parent company of SLT, started running buses from Golborne to the Longford tram terminus via Newton-le-Willows in 1920, but approached the corporation in April 1921 about extending the service through to Central station over the tram route. The corporation agreed, but stipulated that LUT must pay them an amount equal to the tram fare for every passenger carried over this section of route. Similar agreements were later made with Crosville and North Western over other tramway routes.

=== Improvements to the network ===
Although Warrington's trams entered service with open-tops, the majority were rebuilt with canopies and new staircases. Six new trams from Brush Electrical Engineering Company were purchased in 1919, allowing frequencies and operating hours to be increased to meet demand. The corporation also started operating its own bus services, complementing the existing tram network. Routes to Bewsey and Orford started in 1913, with a further route to Padgate in 1928 operating over part of an unbuilt tramway extension along Padgate Lane to Padgate Bridge. A purpose-built bus garage was constructed on Lower Bank Street close to the existing tram depot in 1930.

Track on both the Cemetery and Sankey Bridges routes was relaid in 1922 and 1923, with a substantial amount of doubling taking place on the formerly single-track line to the Cemetery. Meanwhile, powers had been obtained to lay a new line in the town centre running from Scotland Road up Buttermarket Street to Market Gate and down Bridge Street to meet the terminating spur for the Stockton Heath route. This was part of a scheme to enable a through-service between the Cemetery and Stockton Heath lines, and was trialled for a short period after construction was completed in 1922. It became apparent very soon that the poor reliability of the Stockton Heath line was causing knock-on effects on the Cemetery line. The two routes thus reverted to separate operations again, although both terminating near Market Gate at the heart of the town centre. The line along Scotland Road was not used for normal service after this, serving merely as a connecting line from the depot to the terminus of the Longford route at Central station.

=== Closure and replacement ===
In 1929, a proposal was put together to replace trams on the Stockton Heath line with bus services, as the track had been in use for 25 years and was due for renewal. The route was duly closed on 17 September 1931 and was replaced by a corporation bus service from Central station. Nine Leyland TD1s with Brush bodywork were purchased, and it was not long before the service was extended to the suburbs of Walton and Grappenhall, illustrating the flexibility of the motor bus over the fixed infrastructure required for trams. The Longford route operated for the last time at the end of the year, with LUT paying the corporation £25 per annum as a condition of being allowed to operate the replacement bus service. Although there was still several years of life in the tracks before renewal was required, the Sankey Bridges and Cemetery routes were replaced by a through bus service on 28 March 1935, extended at the Cemetery end as far as the junction with the new Kingsway road, near Bruche Bridge.

With the end of the tramway now in sight, the undertaking's name was changed to "Warrington Corporation Transport Department" in April 1935. The Latchford route continued in use until 28 August 1935, which was the last day of tram operation, with a replacement bus service operating from the following day. The last journey of the day was operated by Tram No. 1, which left Rylands Street carrying 136 passengers as opposed to its nominal capacity of 55. This tram is estimated to have carried a total of 9.65 million passengers and operated 777,600 miles during its 33 years of service. The total mileage operated by all trams was about 15 million, carrying a total of 225 million passengers with only one fatality. Unlike many other tramway systems, a profit had been made in every financial year bar one, all loan charges had been paid off, and additionally over £35,000 of relief in rates was handed over.

== Legacy ==
Very few physical remains of the tramway infrastructure are left today, with the last remnants of the old depot on Lower Bank Street being demolished in 1981, the location today being the site of a building that was previously a JJB Sports superstore and fitness club. However, one of the original Milnes trams (Tram No. 2) managed to survive as a bowling green shelter in Cuddington until 1977, when it was saved for preservation by Alan Pritchard. After almost thirty years of storage, restoration began in 2004 by the Merseyside Tramway Preservation Society, located at the Wirral Transport Museum.

The replacement bus services operated by the corporation thrived, and were extended as the town grew, as well as being supplemented by new routes. The majority of bus services within the borough today are still provided by Warrington Borough Council (the successor to the corporation) through Warrington's Own Buses (WB), an arms length limited company wholly owned by the council. WOB celebrated 100 years of public transport operated by the council in 2002 with a recreation of the first tram service, and an open day at the depot featuring open-top bus tours along the original tramway routes.

== See also ==
- Transport in Warrington
- Warrington's Own Buses
- Warrington power station

== Bibliography ==
- 75 Years of Municipal Transport in Warrington 1902–1977, Warrington Transport Department.
- Stretch, E.K. (1972) The South Lancashire Tramways Company 1900–1958, Manchester Transport Museum Society.
- Gillham, J.C. & Wiseman, R.J.S. (2003)The Tramways of South Lancashire and North Wales, Light Rail Transit Association. ISBN 0-948106-29-8
- Phillips, Ron. (2002) Warrington Borough Transport, 1902–2002: 100 Years of Service to the Community, DTS Publishing. ISBN 1-900515-50-4
- Robinson, John P. (1987) Warrington Trams & Buses: A History of Municipal Transport in Warrington, Cheshire Libraries & Museums. ISBN 0-904532-24-0
