= Listed buildings in Culcheth and Glazebury =

Culcheth and Glazebury is a civil parish in the Borough of Warrington, ceremonial county of Cheshire and historic county of Lancashire, England, northeast of the town of Warrington. It contains eleven buildings that are recorded in the National Heritage List for England as designated listed buildings. Other than the villages of Culcheth and Glazebury, the parish is rural. The A574 road runs through it, and two milestones adjacent to the road are listed. In addition a parish boundary stone on the B5207 road is listed. The church in Glazebury is also listed; all the other listed buildings are related to houses or farms.

== Key ==
Grade	Criteria
Grade II*	Particularly important buildings of more than special interest.
Grade II	Buildings of national importance and special interest.

== Buildings ==
Name and location	Photograph	Date	Notes	Grade
Hurst Hall; 53.4678°N 2.5008°W	—	Late 15th century or earlier	This is part of what was originally on old hall, later converted into a barn. It is basically timber framed with brick cladding and a stone slate roof. It is in two bays, with an extra half-bay at each end. The timber roof is open, of unusual construction for the region, and said to be "spectacular".	II*
Holcroft Hall; 53.4522°N 2.4837°W		Late 15th to early 16th century	A farmhouse that has been altered and extended. It is constructed in rendered brick with a slate roof. It is in two storeys with an attic, and has four bays, including an added wing. The windows are mullioned. Inside the house is another mullioned window, moulded beams, and a priest hole.	II*
Hurst Hall Cottage; 53.4675°N 2.5011°W	—	Early 17th century	Originally a farm cottage, this was later converted into a barn. It is constructed n small red brick, with a slate roof. The building is in two storeys and three bays, with a single-bay extension to the east. One window is a horizontally-sliding sash, the others are mullioned.	II
Speakman House; 53.4775°N 2.4978°W	—	1630	A house with later additions and alterations. It is in rendered brick with a slate roof. The house is in two and three storeys, and three bays. The windows are casements. Inside the house are moulded beams, a dog-leg staircase, and a painted text dated 1647.	II
Brookhouse Farmhouse; 53.4521°N 2.5266°W	—	c. 1744	Originally a farmhouse, this is constructed in whitened brick with slate roofs. It is in two storeys and has three bays. The large windows are mullioned and transomed, with central horizontally-sliding sashes.	II
Kenyon Hall; 53.4580°N 2.5354°W	—	Early 19th century	Built as a country house, later a private school, then converted into a golf clubhouse. It is built in rendered and painted brick, and is in Neoclassical style. The building is in two storeys. The north front is in six bays with an entrance loggia, the east front has seven bays, the central three of which project as a shallow segmental bay window, and the south front of seven bays has a single-storey bay window. There are giant pilasters on most corners.	II
Lodge, Kenyon Hall; 53.4597°N 2.5358°W	—	Early 19th century	Originally the lodge to Kenyon Hall, later a private residence. It is stuccoed with a slate roof. The building is in a single storey and two bays. It has pedimented gables, and a Doric porch. The adjacent gate piers are included in the listing.	II
Parish boundary stone 53.4583°N 2.5333°W		Early 19th century (or earlier)	The boundary stone is on the southwest side of the B5207 road (Broseley Lane), and marked the boundary between the parishes of Culcheth and Kenyon. It is in painted sandstone, and has a triangular plan and a flat top. The front faces are inscribed with "BOUN/DARY" and the names of the parishes.	II
All Saints Church, Glazebury; 53.4696°N 2.4952°W		1851	A parish church designed by E. H. Shellard, it is constructed in yellow sandstone rubble with a slate roof. It has a northeast vestry, a southwest porch, and a twin bellcote in the west gable.	II
Milepost, Newchurch Lane; 53.44887°N 2.52135°W		Late 19th century to early 20th century	Located on the east side of the A574 road, this is a triangular whitewashed stone with a sloping top inscribed with incised letters giving the distances in miles to Warrington and Leigh.	II
Milepost, Warrington Road; 53.45646°N 2.50489°W	—	Late 19th century to early 20th century	Located on the southeast side of the A574 road, this is a triangular whitewashed stone with a sloping top inscribed with incised letters giving the distances in miles to Warrington and Leigh.	II

== See also ==
- Listed buildings in Croft
- Listed buildings in Wigan
- Listed buildings in Salford
- Listed buildings in Rixton-with-Glazebrook
- Listed buildings in Birchwood
