= Lewis Gill (musician) =

English composer and musician (born 1968)

Lewis Gill (born 1968) is an English composer and musician, who has worked in the contemporary classical, electronica, art rock and experimental music areas.

== Career ==
=== Early years (art-rock and experimental music) ===
Born in Warrington in 1968 (and a long-term resident of the town's Latchford neighbourhood), Gill initially worked as an electric guitarist in a succession of Warrington-based projects, many of these alongside fellow guitarist and experimenter Ian Simpson. Gill and Simpson initially played together in the art-rock band Cheeky Atom (who released a single mini-album called Jodrell Bank, Here We Come in 1990, blending a fairly conventional guitar-based line-up with avant-garde experimentation including textural work and the incorporation of vacuum cleaners). The record gained the approval of Karlheinz Stockhausen, who wrote back to Gill after being sent a CD.

Gill and Simpson subsequently formed the electronic experimental improvising group Psychiatric Challenge. The group operated between the late 1990s and 2006, and collaborated with Lol Coxhill. Other group members included Harry Gallimore, Neil Packer, Misha Gray, Tim Lyons, Ollie Brice and Dave Jackson. Both Gill and Simpson were in the art-rock/noise rock project Sebastian, which released a lone album, Hew Hoppers Base, on CDr on the Burning Shed label in 2002.

Along with another Psychiatric Challenge collective member, Neil Packer, Gill formed the studio-based Vivahead project, who released a succession of albums on their own Pulper Music label during the early 2000s, inspired by abstract electronica, jazz and drum and bass. He also teamed up with Warrington fusion guitarist Tony Harn for two projects: initially Lifebox in 1998/1999 and then the experimental duo Resindust, who released one eponymous album in 2002.

=== Contemporary classical work ===
In the early 2020s Gill made the switch from performing to full-time contemporary classical composing. He is currently writing and releasing an ongoing series of orchestral and chamber pieces via YouTube videos, all currently realised via synthetic instruments with the hope of producing subsequent versions with live acoustic instrumentation.

Several of Gill's pieces are named after places in the Warrington area, such as Stockton Heath, Culcheth, Lymm, Bewsey, Westy, Orford, Padgate, Dallam and Grasmere. In an interview with The Warrington Guardian, he admitted "I love Warrington and I like the idea of it being put on the map, so I thought why not write a piece of music and name it after a place I've spent a lot of time in and been inspired by?" Gill has also confessed to being inspired by astronomy and "the mystique of black holes".

The first CD release of Gill's Warrington compositions was released under the title of Parochial Chamber Works – Music Inspired by Warrington (Volume 1) on 13 May 2024, (with album track "Bridgewater Dream" being played on BBC6 Radio on 16 June 2024 as part of the playlist for "Stuart Maconie's Freak Zone"). A second volume, Parochial Chamber Works – Music Inspired by Warrington (Volume 2) was released on SoundCloud on 23 May 2024. It was preceded by another album, Redeemer, on 22 May 2024, of which Gill states "I like to think it sits in the middle of avant garde classical and prog. I suppose my use of odd time signatures and odd syncopations comes from Gentle Giant, [King] Crimson, UK etc. The textures and compositional techniques (occasional serialism, chance method etc.) come from Stockhausen, [Luigi] Nono and Webern. The repetitive nature of some pieces comes from [Steve] Reich and [Philip] Glass. It's a (hopefully) well balanced and maybe even innovative fusion of modern classical and prog."

Gill’s "Piano Piece No. 1" has been performed by both Fidan Aghayeva-Edler (in Berlin) and Gary Barnett (at University of California, Riverside), both in early 2025. The string quartet version of his composition "Transit" was performed by the Bristol String Quartet in November 2025.

Gill's music has also been used to soundtrack films, including the British short film Flying at High Noon, directed by Ethan Prescott. Gill’s composition "The Phobos Diary" was used in the soundtrack to Isaac Arthur's documentary Post-Biological Civilizations: Life Beyond Flesh and Bone released in May 2025.

== Influences ==
Gill currently cites Arnold Schoenberg, Karlheinz Stockhausen and Steve Reich as his main compositional influences, as well as György Ligeti and Anton Webern. He was also inspired by the ambitions of 1970s progressive rock, having originally travelled from a teenaged love of King Crimson, Pink Floyd, Supertramp, Yes and Genesis to discovering Ligeti and then progressing to Webern and Stockhausen.

In an interview with Musicngear, he expanded on this, noting that "the pieces that sound improvised are actually written, I like to make some of my music sound 'free' or 'loose' and I can only achieve this with complex notation... All of my pieces are strictly written but some are much more rhythmically simple than others. I am very influenced by the Darmstadt School but I'm equally influenced by American minimalism and I rarely (if ever) reconcile the two styles. I guess the ones that sound improvised come from the Darmstadt influence and are usually composed using serial technique, the ones that are influenced by American minimalism are conventionally written. Despite these influences, I sincerely hope that I have my own distinctive sound. I'd rather not sound like other composers but I can't deny their influences."

== List of compositions ==
(Note - this list only contains Lewis Gill's modern classical compositions)

- "Bewsey Fragments" (in 2 movements, for string quartet)
- "Westy Fragments" (in 2 movements, for string quartet)
- "Black Odyssey (for Janna Levin)" (for strings)
- "Culcheth Fanfares" (for brass quintet)
- "Orford Lines" (for woodwind quintet)
- "Padgate Spectre" (for sextet)
- "Bridgewater Dream" (for flute trio)
- "The Devil's Vertigo" (for double string quintet)
- "Grasmere Skirmish (for Iannis Xenakis)" (for strings and woodwind)
- "Sankey Valley Reverie" (for sextet)
- "Possible Film Music, Part 1" (for piano and strings)
- "Possible Film Music, Part 2" (for strings)
- "Possible Film Music, Part 3" (for tuned percussion and double basses)
- "Bagatelle 1" (for organ)
- "The Golden Square (for Morton Feldman)" (for double quartet)
- "The Phobos Diary" (for strings and woodwind)
- "Dallam Dialogue" (for piccolo and bass clarinet)
- "God's Vertigo" (for strings and woodwind, or chamber orchestra)
- "Stockton Heath Polyphony" (for Arnold Schoenberg) (for wind quintet)
- "Possible Film Music, Part 6" (for strings and chamber group)
- "Neuroklang, part 1 (for chamber ensemble)
- "The Lymm Variations (for Alban Berg)" (for strings, piano and wind trio)
- "Bagatelle 2" (for harpsichord and horn)
- "Bagatelle 3" (for piano and cello)
- "Bagatelle 4" (for two violins and glockenspiel)
- "Neuroklang, part 2" (for chamber ensemble)
- "Bagatelle 5" (for flute trio)
- "The Pathway that Connects Woolacombe Close and Wash Lane (At Midnight) (for Howard Jones, drummer)"
- "Tempus" (for chamber orchestra and male choir)
- "Elbrus" (for strings, brass and percussion)
- "Possible Film Musics" (ongoing series for various instruments)
- "Cobb's Estate Poetry (parts 1 & 2)" (arrangement of piece by Malcolm Tudor)
- "Piano Piece No. 1" (for solo piano)
- "Transit" (for 2 pianos or string quartet)
- "Glimpse (parts 1-4)" (for woodwind quartet)
- "Bring Me the Head of Zeno the Eleatic" (for solo piano)

== Discography ==
- Parochial Chamber Works – Music Inspired by Warrington (Volume 1) (2024)
- Redeemer (2024)
- Parochial Chamber Works – Music Inspired by Warrington (Volume 2) (2024)

=== with Cheeky Atom ===
- Jodrell Bank, Here We Come (Stranger Music, 1990)

=== with Psychiatric Challenge ===
- Live at Madge's Kitchen (Electronic Musik, Em000)
- It's Just Noise (with Lol Coxhill) (Electronic Musik, Em040, 2009)
- Northern Silence (Electronic Musik, Em107)
- First Recordings (Electronic Musik, Em147)
- 45 Minutes for Hugh (Electronic Musik, no catalogue number)
- Noise Reduction System (Electronic Musik, no catalogue number)
- The Bracelet on the String (Electronic Musik, no catalogue number)
- Fraktured Culture (Electronic Musik, no catalogue number)
- Four Plus Five (Electronic Musik, no catalogue number)
- Why do We Talk ? (about half - life) (Electronic Musik, no catalogue number)
- Provocation of Sound (Electronic Musik, no catalogue number)
- Concerto for White Goods and Electronics (Electronic Musik, no catalogue number)
- "Echoes of Madges Kitchen" - contribution to various-artists compilation Sonic Planar Analysis: 01 (Stasisfield, SF-CD101, 2002)

=== with Vivahead ===
- We Love Infinity (Pulper Music, 2001)
- Lavatory Studies (Pulper Music, 2001)
- Slug (Pulper Music, 2002)
- Cosmic Dunce (Pulper Music, 2003)
- AWOL Umbrellas (Pulper Music, 2003)
- Puppet Thirst Meditations (Pulper Music, 2004)

=== with Sebastian ===
- Hew Hoppers Base (Burning Shed, 2002)

=== with Resindust ===
- Resindust (self-released, 2002)
