= Listed buildings in Poulton-with-Fearnhead =

Poulton-with-Fearnhead is a civil parish in the Borough of Warrington in Cheshire, England, containing suburbs to the north and east of the town of Warrington. It contains nine buildings that are recorded in the National Heritage List for England as designated listed buildings, all of which are at Grade II. This is the lowest of the three gradings given to listed buildings, applied to "buildings of national importance and special interest". The parish is almost entirely residential, and includes the Warrington suburbs of Padgate, Fearnhead, Cinnamon Brow, Blackbrook, Longbarn, Bruche and Paddington. The listed buildings are all residential, or related to former farms, other than a church and a milestone.

Name and location	Photograph	Date	Notes
Barn; 53.4182°N 2.5626°W	—	Late 17th century	Formerly associated with a farm, the barn is located to the north of 103 Cinnamon Lane. It is constructed in small bricks, with a stone slate roof. The barn is in four bays, and has retained its open internal roof structure.
2 and 4 Mead Road; 53.4027°N 2.5563°W	—	Late 17th century	This originated as three cottages, two of which have been converted into a single dwelling. The building is constructed in rendered shall bricks. It has a slate roof, with a sandstone ridge. The building has two storeys, with three bays. The smaller cottage, on the west, has three-light horizontal sliding sash windows, the other has later three-light casements.
Paddington Grange; 53.3974°N 2.5529°W	—	Late 18th century or early 19th century	Originating as a guest house, later a private residence, the building is constructed in rendered brick with slate roofs, and has a T-shaped plan. It is in two storeys, and has a four-bay garden front, and a two-bay entrance front. In the garden front are French windows; the other windows are sashes. Internally, the lounge has a decorative ceiling with roundels, a wall frieze, and a recess with pilasters.
Stables, Paddington Grange; 53.39745°N 2.5524°W	—	Late 18th century or early 19th century	The stables are built in red brick with a hipped slate roof. They are in two storeys and three bays. There are three openings, the central one being larger than those at the sides. Above the side openings are round pitch holes; above the central opening is a diamond-shaped vent.
The Close; 53.4176°N 2.5637°W	—	1833	Originally a school, this was later converted into a private house. It is constructed in rendered brick, with a hipped slate roof. The building is in three storeys, and two bays. The windows are sashes.
Fearnhead House; 53.4176°N 2.5634°W	—	c. 1833	The house is constructed in rendered brick, with a hipped slate roof. It is in two storeys with three bays. The doorway is approached up three steps; it is surrounded by stucco pilasters, and a moulded head. The windows are a mixture of bay windows and sashes.
Christ Church, Padgate; 53.4074°N 2.5565°W		1838	The chancel and vestries were added in 1882–83 by William Owen, and the church was re-ordered in 1963–71 by George Pace. The nave is in red brick, the chancel in brown brick, and the roofs are slated. The church has lancet windows, and a west bellcote.
103 Cinnamon Lane; 53.4180°N 2.5624°W	—	Mid 19th century	Originally a farmhouse, this is constructed in brick with stone slate roofs. It is in two storeys and three bays. The windows are casements, and the gables have shaped purlins and narrow bargeboards.
Milestone; 53.41405°N 2.54724°W	—	Between 1881–82 and 1894	A triangular stone milestone with a sloping top on the north side of Fearnhead Lane. It is incised with the name of the parish, and the distances in miles to the market places of Leigh and Warrington.
