= Woolston, Cheshire =

Civil parish in Cheshire, England

Coordinates: 53.4013°N 2.5332°W

Woolston
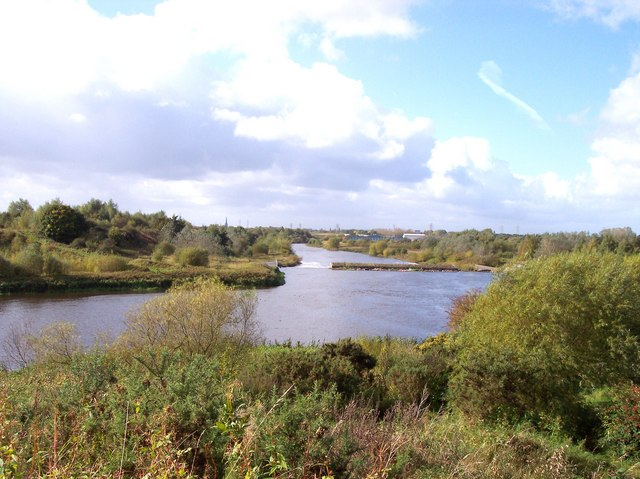
- The River Mersey at Woolston

- Location within Cheshire
- Population: 7,156 (2011)
- OS grid reference: SJ645895
- Civil parish: Woolston
- Unitary authority: Warrington
- Ceremonial county: Cheshire
- Region: North West
- Country: England
- Sovereign state: United Kingdom
- Post town: WARRINGTON
- Postcode district: WA1
- Dialling code: 01925
- Police: Cheshire
- Fire: Cheshire
- Ambulance: North West
- UK Parliament: Warrington North

Woolston is a settlement and civil parish in the Borough of Warrington in the county of Cheshire, England. Formerly a township called 'Woolston with Martinscroft' within the parish of Warrington, there are two main settlements: Woolston to the west and Martinscroft to the east. Formerly within the historic county of Lancashire, the parish is on the north bank of the River Mersey and takes in Paddington to the south-west. It is bounded by the River Mersey to the south, Bruche and Padgate to the west, Longbarn and Birchwood to the north and Rixton to the east.

The township remained an agricultural community on the furthest outskirts of Warrington until the 1970s, when the development of Warrington New Town radically transformed its rural character. The parish is generally known as just Woolston.

== Geography ==
A 1907 Victoria County History description reads:

The flat country is divided into fields with rather meagre hedgerows and scanty trees. The alluvial and sandy soil appears fertile, yielding good crops of potatoes and turnips, oats, wheat, and clover, whilst many a marshy corner is devoted to the cultivation of osiers for the manufacture of potato hampers and 'skips'. In the north of the district, there is a considerable patch of moss land and here too there is a good deal of clay in the surface soil. By the river, there are moist pastures. The inhabitants are entirely employed in agricultural labour and basket making.

The area has two main natural areas: Woolston Linear Park and the Woolston Eyes Nature Reserve, a Site of Special Scientific Interest.

Woolston is in the Mersey Valley and so there is a very slight lowering in height between it and the surrounding areas. The highest point is on the Woolston Eyes, formerly Thelwall Eyes, (four-man-made areas formed by large embankments for the dispersement of dredging waste). The lowest point is the marshland formed by the dereliction of the Woolston New Cut Canal and Woolston Old Canal. The Manchester Ship Canal denotes the southerly boundary of the Eyes reserve and can be crossed either via nearby Latchford locks or by the unique penny ferry crossing (11p each way as of October 2009). Woolston has plenty of waterways including the aforementioned canals; the new cut of the River Mersey; and the Manchester Ship Canal.

== History ==
Woolston is part of the historic county of Lancashire, but after local government reforms of 1974, administratively it became part of Cheshire. Up to the last decade of the nineteenth century, Woolston and its immediate area was a township called "Woolston with Martinscroft" in Warrington ancient parish, which was itself part of West Derby Hundred. Towards the middle to end of the nineteenth century, it was part of Warrington rural sanitary district and Warrington poor law union.

In 1894, Woolston with Martinscroft joined the newly formed Warrington Rural District as a civil parish, where it remained until 1933. There was a boundary change to the civil parish in 1885 when the county boundary between Lancashire and Cheshire was adjusted: it gained part of Thelwall civil parish from Cheshire. A complex set of boundary changes occurred in 1933, involving the county boundary with Cheshire: the civil parish gained part of Lymm ancient parish; exchanged areas of land with Grappenhall ancient parish; and exchanged areas of land with Thelwall civil parish, all in Cheshire. Finally, and again in 1933, the civil parish of Woolston with Martinscroft was abolished and parts used to create the civil parishes of Croft and the modern day civil parish of Woolston, both in Lancashire. This new civil parish of Woolston was formed from parts of the old Woolston with Martinscroft civil parish, as explained above, and also part of Culcheth civil parish. It remained in Warrington rural district until the local government reforms of 1974 which created the borough of Warrington which was located in Cheshire. In 1998, when Warrington borough became a unitary authority, it remained in the ceremonial county of Cheshire, and continued to be served by Cheshire Police and Cheshire Fire and Rescue Service.

Throughout time its name has changed often. At time of the Vikings it was called Wulfiges Town (probably because of the wolves that occupied the land).

It is a civil parish which grew in the 20th century: the population in 1901 was just 484.

== Economy ==
A large area of the district is covered by warehousing districts. The largest by far is the "Grange" which is an area of modern warehousing and light manufacturing built next to the M6 motorway. This area was home to a large Safeway distribution depot that was taken over by Morrisons in January 2006, and subsequently taken over by Iceland in mid-2006. In 2007, this was outsourced to DHL, while still continuing to serve Iceland.

Woolston is home to a number of smaller businesses including Big Storage on the main A57 and Paragon Framing. There is also an industrial estate to the south called the "New Cut industrial estate", this features a large pipework fabrication business (WH Capper) and several small offices and small holdings. The estate gets its name from the canal which borders it and the "new cut" of the River Mersey.

== Education ==
Education is provided by Woolston Church of England Primary School, St. Peters' Catholic Primary School and Woolston Community Primary School. Woolston Community Primary School has 238 pupils. The original school building was demolished in 2014 after a new school was built on the same site. There is a designated provision for children aged 7 to 11 with autism. The headteacher, Mr Toyne won the Warrington Guardian Teacher of the month in March 2015.

St. Peter's Catholic Primary School is in connection with one of many local Roman Catholic churches in the adjacent Martinscroft area, the St Peters & St Michaels Church. Despite the school being one of the newer schools in the area, they still boast the best results from both Keystage 1 and Keystage 2 in the Woolston area.

Secondary Education was provided by Woolston Community High School which closed in 2012.

King's Leadership Academy Warrington (Warrington's first Free School) opened its doors to its first year 7 in 2012. The school is the brainchild of Sir Iain Hall (previous career in working with failing schools in the US and the emergence of the Charter School system in the USA). Based on Seymour Drive at present, the school is set to move to its new purpose build school building soon which is set close to Woolston Park

== Places of worship ==
Woolston remained a Catholic stronghold after the Reformation, with Benedictine services being held in the chapel at Woolston Hall, until its demolition in the early 1800s. St Peter's Church, served by secular clergy, was built on Weir Lane, Martinscroft, in 1835 and is now a Grade II listed building. It is part of the Arch-diocese of Liverpool.

A Wesleyan Methodist chapel was built on Manchester Road, Martinscroft, in 1827 and demolished by the New Town Corporation in 1977. A modern replacement, St Martin's Church, was built on Gig Lane, Woolston in 1975.

The Church of the Ascension (Church of England) on Warren Lane, Woolston, was built in 1968, from plans drawn up in 1959. It is part of the Diocese of Liverpool.

== Leisure and community ==
A Leisure Centre was built in Hall Road in 1972, as part of the New Town Development, and refurbished in 2010 and 2011 to become Woolston Neighbourhood Hub. It has good disabled access.

Swimming

There are two pools at the Leisure Centre, both open seven days a week. The Main Pool is 25 m by 12 m with a depth of 1 m to 1,7m. The Teaching Pool is 13 m by 9 m with a depth of 0.8 m to 0.9 m.

There is a swimming club, Warriors of Warrington, which caters to Juniors, Beginners, Seniors, Veterans and Disabled.

Squash

There are three squash courts at the Leisure Centre, with glass fronts for viewing.

Gym

There is a Future Fitness gym at the Leisure Centre, with sauna and steam rooms.

Cycling

A linear footpath following the old tow path of the New Cut Canal completed in 1821 to bypass a large bend in the River Mersey and part of the Irwell and Mersey Navigation. The path starts at Paddington Bank and runs for 3 kilometres to Weir Lane, Woolston. Along the way passing Paddington Locks, Paddington Meadows Nature Reserve, Larkfield Park, The Ecology Park, Woolston Park South, Grey Mist Mere, Nottingham Close Play area, the site of Woolston Locks and ends at Woolston Weir Pool.

A number of groups have meetings at the Mission Hall (the C of E church hall) on Warren Lane:

Pre-school Playgroup

Youth Club

WRVS affiliated Over-sixties Club

Woolston Slimming Club

Woolston Ladies' Group

Woolston WI

== Sport ==
A greyhound racing track was opened on 12 September 1934. The racing was independent (not affiliated to the sports governing body the National Greyhound Racing Club) and was known as a flapping track, which was the nickname given to independent tracks. The track was directly north of the Grey Mist Mere Lake and the Woolston New Cut Canal. The track described as being horseshoe shaped closed in 1937.

== Demography ==
Woolston has a population of 7,156.

At the 2001 Census:

- Woolston had an average housing density of 2.66 residents per household.

=== Housing ===
Of 1783 households

- 1574 (88.3%) were owner occupied
- 203 (11.4%) were rented
- 5 (0.3%) were of unknown status

=== Employment ===
- 19.3% of 16- to 74-year-old residents had no qualifications
- 2.1% are unemployed

=== Race and gender ===
- 48.3% of residents are Male
- 51.7% of residents are Female

of which

- 98% are of white (all origins) race
- 0.34% are of mixed race
- 0.92% are of Asian or Asian British origin
- 0.62% are of Chinese origin
- 0.12% are of Black race

Source:Office for National Statistics Neighbourhood profiles for areas Warrington 014A,014B,014B

== Transport ==
Woolston has no railway station of its own, the nearest ones are at the nineteenth-century Padgate station and at the 1980s Birchwood station, formerly Risley Halt. There are direct trains from these stations to Liverpool Lime Street, Warrington Central, Manchester Piccadilly, Sheffield, York, and Newcastle Passengers change at Warrington Central for Warrington Bank Quay, for West Coast Main Line services to London Euston and Scotland.

Junction 21 of the M6 motorway lies to the east of Martinscroft.

The A57 to Manchester and Liverpool runs directly through the district. There is also a road running from the motorway past the Grange to Birchwood and Longbarn, two areas built in the 1970s during the New Town development.

Warrington's Own Buses (3, 4, 4A) and Warrington Coachways (104) provide local bus services to Warrington Town Centre, whilst First Greater Manchester operate an inter-urban service (100) to Manchester via Irlam and the Trafford Centre.

The Penny Ferry (now 11p) can be used to cross the Manchester Ship Canal to Thelwall. This is a part-time service. If not available a detour can be made over the Latchford Locks.

Manchester Airport is the closest major airport to Woolston.

== Public services ==
The area is served by an ante-natal clinic on Holes Lane and a GP doctors surgery located close by. There is also a new chiropractic clinic at Woolston Neighbourhood Hub.

Warrington's Direct Services are based in Woolston and provide services to the local community.

There are no local fire and police services. The nearest providers are at Risley Police Station and Birchwood Fire Station. Although there is a community police office located on the site of Dam lane shops.

== Notable people ==
- It was the birthplace of Old Billy, the oldest horse that ever lived (1760–1822).
- Michael Adrian Hankinson O.S.B, Bishop of Port Louis, Mauritius – born in Warrington 1817, of a Woolston family.

== See also ==
- Listed buildings in Woolston, Cheshire
- Woolston Park
- Grange Industrial Estate
