= Louis Gill =

Louis or Lewis Gill may refer to:

- Louis J. Gill (1940–2020), American politician
- Louis John Gill (1885–1969), American architect
- Lewis Gill (musician) (born 1968), English composer and musician
