= King's Leadership Academy Warrington =

King's Leadership Academy

Location
- Hillock Lane; WA1 4PF, Woolston; Warrington, Cheshire; England; 53.4°N 2.54°W

Information
- Type: coeducational secondary school
- Motto: Credimus
- Established: 2012
- Founder: Sir Iain Hall
- Local authority: Warrington Borough Council
- Trust: Great Schools Trust
- Department for Education URN: 138562 Tables
- Ofsted: Reports
- Principal: Umar Hussain
- Gender: Coeducational
- Age: 11 to 16
- Capacity: 840
- Website: www.kingswarrington.com

King's Leadership Academy Warrington is a coeducational secondary school based in the Woolston area of Warrington, Cheshire, England.

The school opened in 2012 after the closure of Woolston High School but was set up independently as a free school by Sir Iain Hall and 'Great+ Schools' and not as a replacement from the local authority. It currently has approximately 808 students and has a capacity of 840 The school won the National Character Award 2015 and was shortlisted in the Tes School Awards 2021 for the category of Secondary School of the Year Award in November 2020. The school has been graded as "Outstanding" by ofsted since 2019, scoring an "Outstanding" on four out of the five grading criteria (only receiving a "Good" in 16-19 study programmes).

== Sixth form ==
In September 2017, King's Leadership Academy opened its sixth form college, it provided a range of programmes for BTEC and A-levels. The college has very strict entry requirements, only allowing 120 students in and requiring strong GSCE's in the chosen subjects (grade 7 or above).
