= List of preserved Warrington buses =

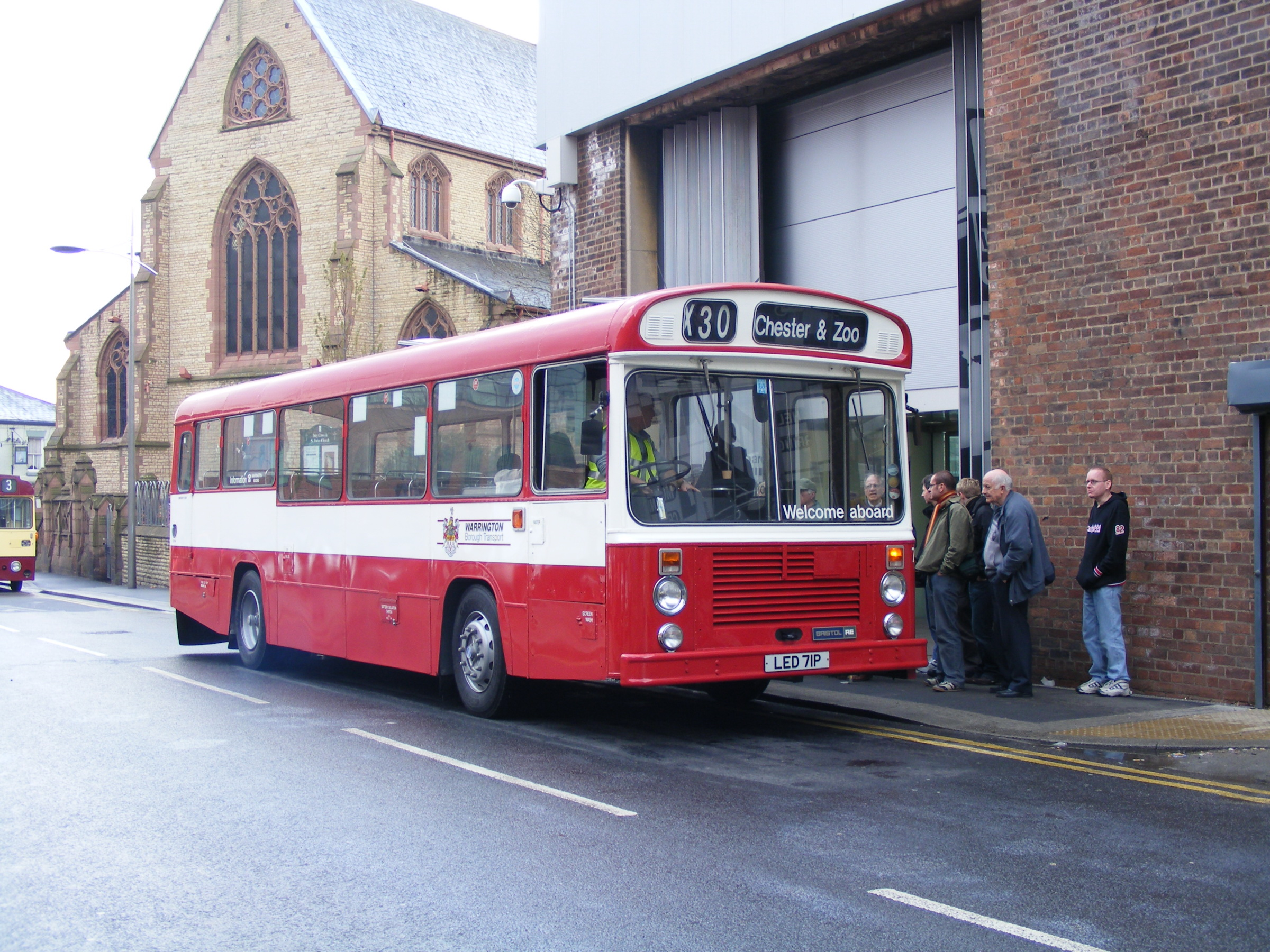
Former Warrington Borough Transport 71, a preserved Bristol RE with East Lancs bodywork

Warrington's Own Buses, formerly Warrington Borough Transport, is a municipal bus company operating in the borough of Warrington, England.

There are several examples of former vehicles that used to operate for the company that are now preserved or undergoing restoration. Some of these are located at transport museums, whilst others can be seen at rallies and historic running days around the country. Many of the earlier examples feature the traditional Warrington licence plate area letter code "ED".

Chassis	Bodywork	Registration	Fleetnumber	Built	Notes
Peckham P22	Milnes	-	2	1902	Tram currently undergoing restoration at the Wirral Transport Museum
Leyland Titan PD1	Alexander	DED 797	18	1946	Privately owned, at North West Museum of Road Transport
Leyland Titan PD1	Alexander	EED 5	27	1946	Privately owned
Leyland Titan PD1	Alexander	EED 8	24	1947	Preserved
Leyland Titan PD2/1	Leyland	FED 795	10	1949	Preserved as world tour bus
Foden PVD6	East Lancs	OED 217	112	1956	Last Foden PVD6 built, privately owned in Devon
Leyland Titan PD2/40	East Lancs	AED 31B	16	1964	Preserved at Bohemia Motor Transport Museum, Czech Republic
Leyland Titan PD2/40 (Special)	East Lancs	BE-63-84 (was BED 722C)	41	1965	Preserved as an open top bus in the Netherlands
Leyland Titan PD2/40 (Special)	East Lancs	BED 729C	148	1965	Preserved by the company
Leyland Titan PD2/40 (Special)	East Lancs	BED 731C	50	1965	Preserved at North West Museum of Road Transport
Leyland Panther Cub PSRC1/1	East Lancs	KED 546F	92	1968	Preserved
Bristol RESL6G	East Lancs	LED 70P	70	1975	Preserved in Wigan
Bristol RESL6G	East Lancs	LED 71P	71	1975	Privately owned, stored near Knutsford
Bristol RESL6G	East Lancs	LED 72P	72	1975	Preserved, stored near Uckfield
Bristol RESL6G	East Lancs	LED 73P	73	1975	Preserved in St Helens
Leyland Atlantean AN68A/1R	East Lancs	GEK 14V	14	1980	Privately owned, currently undergoing restoration at North West Museum of Road Transport
Leyland Atlantean AN68C/1R	East Lancs	OTB 26W	26	1981	Originally preserved at Bohemia Motor Transport Museum, Czech Republic but now used for storage at Camping Praha Klanovice, Czech Republic (June 2019)
Dennis Dominator	East Lancs	C100 UBC	100	1985	Preserved in Leicester
Dodge S56	Northern Counties	D101 TTJ	201	1987	Awaiting restoration, stored in Warrington
Dennis Dart	Carlyle Dartline	H886 LOX to be re registered with a northern Irish plate	209	1990	awaiting attention to be used as a recovery vehicle, current owners T. Tiley/J. Potter Stroud
Dennis Dart	Carlyle Dartline	H842 NOC	214	1991	Preserved

== See also ==
- North West Museum of Road Transport
