= Woolston Park =

Park in Woolston, Cheshire, England

Coordinates: 53.404°N 2.542°W

Woolston Park is a modern park that is situated in the civil parish of Woolston, Warrington, in the English county of Cheshire.

Woolston Park covers 56 acres (230,000 m^{2}) and was officially opened in 1977. It was created from neglected farmland to provide a valuable refuge for people and wildlife amongst the rapidly expanding local community. Running through the middle of the "linear" section runs "Spittle Brook", a small stream often polluted with chemicals from the Grange Industrial Estate. The majority of the landscape of the park is manmade with soil being transported to build hills. The park is mainly open grassland for recreation. It is bordered by Hillock Lane playing fields. In its centre are the "Jubilee Gardens" commemorating the Silver Jubilee of Queen Elizabeth II.

Woolston Park has a number of football pitches used by Monks club and rugby posts; two cricket strips; several playing areas including the "A B frame" and a new play area which includes a zip wire. The park is popular with dog walkers.
