= Padgate Academy =

Location
- Insall Road; Padgate; Warrington, Cheshire, WA2 0LN; England
- Coordinates: 53.411°N 2.560°W

Information
- Type: Academy
- Motto: Proud to be Padgate
- Established: 1976
- Trust: The Challenge Academy Trust - TCAT
- Department for Education URN: 146765 Tables
- Principal: Adam McMillan
- Vice Principal: Ibrahim Syed
- Gender: Coeducational
- Age: 11 to 16
- Enrolment: 500+
- Colours: Red, Grey & Black
- Website: http://www.padgateacademy.co.uk/

Padgate Academy is a coeducational secondary school located in the Padgate area of Warrington in the English county of Cheshire.

It was first known as Padgate Community High School, it then became Lysander Community High School. The school converted to academy status on 1 January 2013 and was renamed University Academy Warrington. Previously it was a community school under the direct control of Warrington Borough Council. The school continues to coordinate with Warrington Borough Council regarding its admissions.

In December 2018, the school was rebrokered and became Padgate Academy, sponsored by The Challenge Academy Trust (TCAT).

== Notable former pupils ==
- Chris Evans, radio and television presenter
- Darren Jeffries, actor
- Kerry Katona, reality television personality
- Luke Littler, darts player
