= Listed buildings in Woolston, Cheshire =

Woolston is a civil parish in the Borough of Warrington in Cheshire, England, and is a suburb to the east of the town of Warrington. It contains four buildings that are recorded in the National Heritage List for England as designated listed buildings, all of which are listed at Grade II. This is the lowest of the three gradings given to listed buildings, applied to "buildings of national importance and special interest". The parish is almost entirely residential, and the A57 road runs through it. One of the listed buildings is a milestone on the road, and the others are a church, a pair of cottages, and a single cottage.

Name and location	Photograph	Date	Notes
Clayton Cottage and Moss Edge Cottage; 53.3972°N 2.5194°W	—	Early 17th century	This originated as a farmhouse, later divided into two cottages. The building is constructed in rendered and painted brick with a slate roof. It is in two storeys plus an attic, with two gables on the front. The windows are casements.
3 Martincroft Green; 53.3979°N 2.5175°W	—	17th century (probable)	A cottage in brick with a stone slate roof. It is in two storeys, and two bays. The windows are horizontally sliding sashes.
Milestone; 53.39890°N 2.52132°W	—	Late 18th century to early 19th century	A milestone on the south side of the A57 road. It consists of a whitewashed triangular stone with a flat top, inscribed with the distances in miles to Warrington and Manchester.
St Peter's Church; 53.3974°N 2.5200°W	—	1834–35	This is a Roman Catholic church, designed by John Smith of Liverpool. It is a simple rectangular building in four bays, constructed in brick with a rendered plinth and quoins, and a slate roof. It has an apsidal east end linking to the presbytery, and lancet windows. Inside is a west gallery carried on Doric columns.
