= Christ Church, Croft =

Coordinates: 53.4374°N 2.5433°W

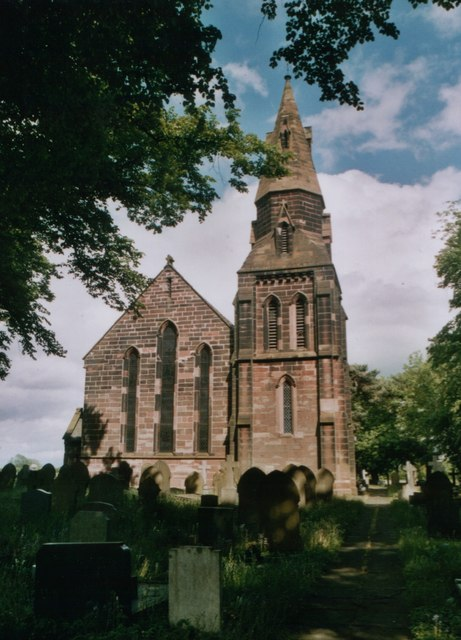
- Christ Church, Croft, from the west

- Location in Cheshire
- OS grid reference: SJ 640,936
- Location: Lady Lane, Croft, Cheshire
- Country: England
- Denomination: Anglican
- Website: Christ Church, Croft

History
- Status: Parish church
- Consecrated: 29 November 1833

Architecture
- Functional status: Active
- Heritage designation: Grade II
- Designated: 9 August 1966
- Architect: Edward Blore
- Architectural type: Church
- Style: Gothic Revival
- Groundbreaking: 1832
- Completed: 1833
- Construction cost: £2,667

Administration
- Province: York
- Diocese: Liverpool
- Archdeaconry: Warrington
- Deanery: Winwick
- Parish: Croft with Southworth

Clergy
- Rector: Revd Dr C J Stafford

Christ Church is in Lady Lane, Croft, Cheshire, England. It is an active Anglican parish church in the deanery of Winwick, the archdeaconry of Warrington, and the diocese of Liverpool. Its benefice is united with that of Newchurch. The church is designated by English Heritage as a Grade II listed building. It was a Commissioners' church and had received a grant for its building from the Church Building Commission.

== History ==
The church was built between 1832 and 1833 to a design by Edward Blore. A grant of £1,457 (equivalent to £150,000 in 2025) was given towards its construction by the Church Building Commission. Its total cost was £2,667. The church was consecrated on 29 November 1833 by the Bishop of Chester.

From 1839 until 1892, the rector of Croft with Southworth was Thomas Penyngton Kirkman, who in addition to his ministerial work was also a mathematician, for whom Kirkman triple systems are named.

== Architecture ==
Christ Church is constructed in red sandstone with slate roofs. Its plan consists of a five-bay nave, a short chancel, and a steeple at the southwest corner. The tower is square with angle buttresses, a doorway on the east side, lancet windows on the south and west faces, and bell openings consisting of twin louvred lancets. The summit of the tower broaches into a hexagonal drum with louvred lucarnes, above which is the spire, also containing lucarnes. All the windows in the church are lancets.

Inside the church is a small west gallery. Also present are panels inscribed with the Creed, the Ten Commandments, and the Lord's Prayer. The reredos is in coloured marble and Caen stone. The stained glass in the east window is by Mayer of Munich. It depicts the Good Shepherd flanked by Saint Peter and Saint Paul. The other Windows are by Shrigley and Hunt.

== See also ==
- List of Commissioners' churches in Northeast and Northwest England
- Listed buildings in Croft, Cheshire
