= Warrington Cycle Campaign =

Cycling campaign group

Warrington Cycle Campaign is a cycling campaign group that aims to promote safer cycling and more cycling. Although based in Warrington in England, the campaign has received international recognition, mainly due to its "Cycle Facility of the Month" feature.

The Warrington Cycle campaign has produced publications aimed at improving the safety of cyclists on the road. These include a leaflet encouraging better understanding between bus drivers and cyclists and a report on the design and use of cycle lanes.

== Cycle Facility of the Month ==
The Cycle Facility of the Month is a humorous feature that highlights poor, unusable and absurd cycle facilitates. This feature has received international recognition in the media and from national governments. The first facility the site featured in March 2001 was in Warrington, but the feature quickly went national, with the April 2001 facility showing a cycle lane in Camden, then in October 2007 it went international and featured a cycle lane in France.

=== Crap Cycle Lanes ===
Based upon Warrington's Cycle Facility of the Month, Eye Books produced a book called Crap Cycle Lanes showing 50 of the worst facilities.

Proceeds from the book go the Cyclists' Defence Fund, a UK charity that provides legal representation for cyclists.

== See also ==
- Segregated cycle facilities
- List of cycleways
- Utility cycling

== External links and bibliography ==
- Official website
- Cycle Facility of the Month

Crap Cycle Lanes. Publisher Eye Books 10 November 2007. ISBN 1-903070-58-9
