= Padgate railway station =

Railway station in Cheshire, England

Padgate
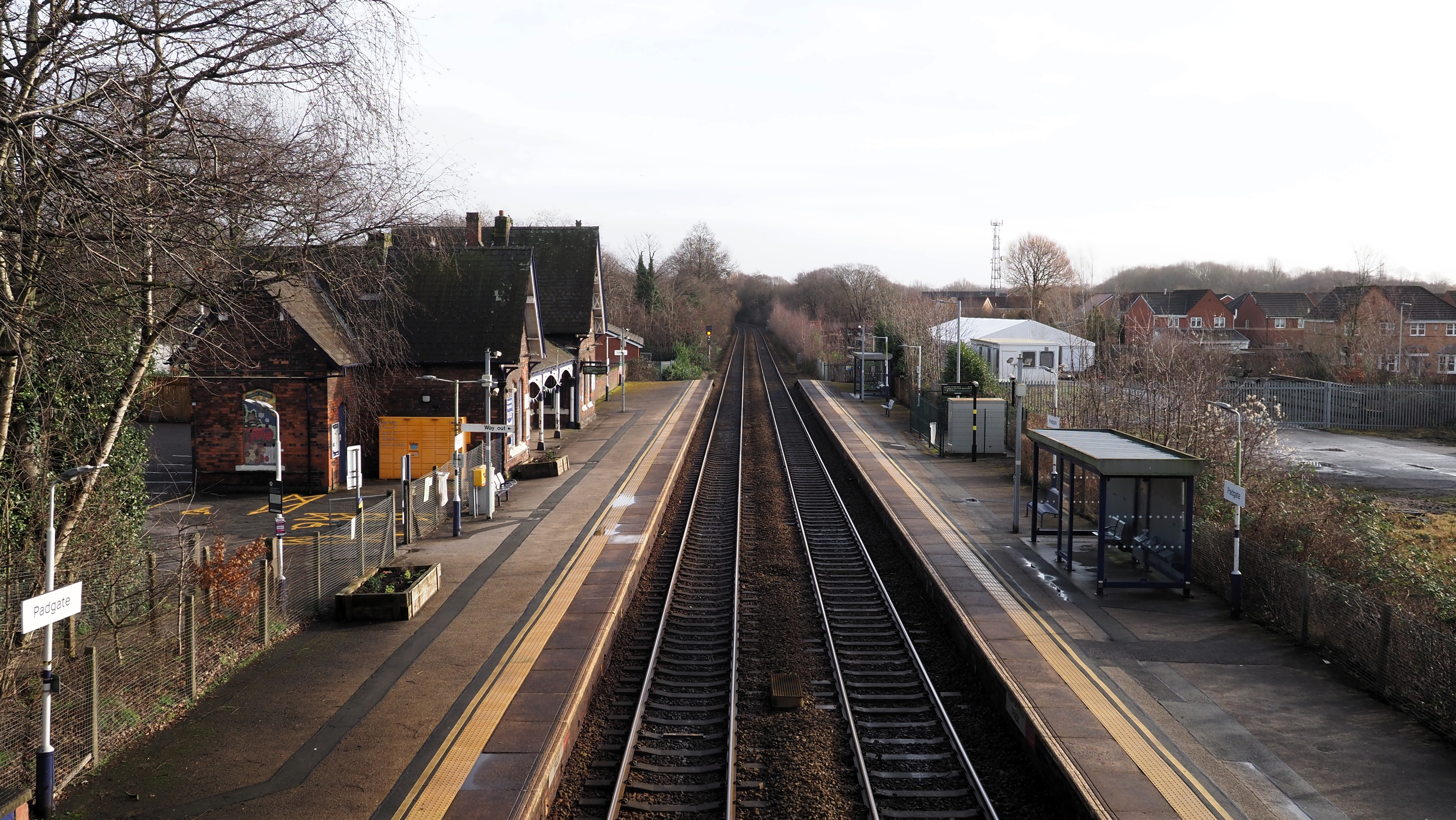
- Padgate Station pictured in 2026

General information
- Location: Padgate, Warrington; England
- Coordinates: 53.4057°N 2.5570°W
- Grid reference: SJ630900
- Managed by: Northern Trains
- Platforms: 2

Other information
- Station code: PDG
- Classification: DfT category F2

Passengers
- 2020/21: ▼35,828
- 2021/22: ▲92,434
- 2022/23: ▲0.104 million
- 2023/24: ▲0.113 million
- 2024/25: ▲0.118 million
Location
Notes
- Passenger statistics from the Office of Rail and Road

Padgate railway station is a railway station in the Padgate area of the east of the town of Warrington, in North West England. The station, and all trains serving it, are operated by Northern Trains. It is 14 miles (23 km) west of Manchester Oxford Road on the southern route of the Liverpool to Manchester Line.

== Facilities ==
The station is unstaffed, so passengers boarding at this station purchase their tickets from the ticket machines or from a train conductor. Waiting shelters and timetable posters are located on each platform and there is step-free access on both sides.

The station building is of typical Cheshire Lines Committee design and houses a fish and chip shop.

== Services ==
There is an hourly service in each direction to Manchester Oxford Road and to Liverpool Lime Street, with extra services in the peak hours. There are no services from this station on Sundays.

Preceding station	National Rail	Following station
Warrington Central	Northern Trains Liverpool-Manchester Line Monday-Saturday only	Birchwood
Disused railways
Newchurch Halt Line and station closed	London and North Eastern Railway Glazebrook West Curve	Warrington Central Line and station open
