= Cinnamon Brow =

Suburb of Warrington, Cheshire, England

Cinnamon Brow is an area on the east side of Warrington, in the Warrington district, in the ceremonial county of Cheshire, England, between Orford and Birchwood. It has a population of around 12,000 residents living in approximately 3,600 houses (an average of 3.3 residents per household).

== Facilities ==
Facilities include Cinnamon Brow Primary School, Fife Rangers Playing field, Brookside Farm, pubs, a church, a University of Chester campus, and a One Stop store.

== Transport ==
Cinnamon Brow is served by buses run by Warrington's Own Buses: bus number 25 runs Monday to Saturday daytimes via the area between Gorse Covert and Warrington Interchange; buses 26 and 27 run similar routes between the two end points on Sundays. On Monday to Saturday evenings, services 26E and 27E run between Cinnamon Brow and central Warrington. Finally, on Monday to Friday daytimes, bus 23A runs a circular route around Cinnamon Brow and its environs.

== Important Roads ==
The main road in Cinnamon Brow is Enfield Park Road. This leads off to Isherwood Close, Wasley Close, Stirrup Close and others, which, together, lead to every house in the area. One of the roads connected to Enfield Park Road is Cinnamon Lane which connects Cinnamon Brow to Fearnhead.

== Census Data ==
At the 2001 census of 3,339 houses in Poulton North (Cinnamon Brow and its neighbouring districts):

- 1977 (59.2%) were owner occupied
- 801 (24.0%) were rented from private landlords
- 524 (15.7%) were rented from the council
- 37 (1.1%) were of an unknown status
