= Listed buildings in Birchwood =

Birchwood is a civil parish in the Borough of Warrington in Cheshire, England, and a suburb to the east of the town of Warrington. It contains two buildings that are recorded in the National Heritage List for England as designated listed buildings, both of which are listed at Grade II. This is the lowest of the three gradings given to listed buildings, applied to "buildings of national importance and special interest". The parish is mainly residential, forming part of Warrington New Town. Its listed buildings consist of a former farmhouse and a former barn.

Name and location	Photograph	Date	Notes
Croft Parish Council Community House; 53.4225°N 2.5296°W	—	1709	This originated as a farmhouse, later converted into meeting rooms. It is constructed in brick, with a stone slab roof. The building is in two storeys, with three bays and an added west wing. The windows are sashes.
Barn; 53.4225°N 2.5293°W	—	Early 18th century	The barn has been converted into a garage and store. It is constructed in brick with a slate roof. It consists of five bays, with a wing added to the east.
