= Croft, Cheshire =

Village in Cheshire, England

Coordinates: 53.437°N 2.552°W

Croft
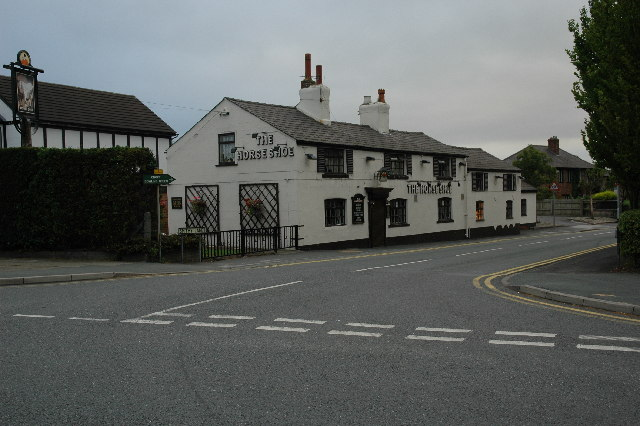
- The Horse Shoe public house, Croft

- Location within Cheshire
- Population: 2,920 (2001 Census)
- OS grid reference: SJ634935
- Civil parish: Croft
- Unitary authority: Warrington
- Ceremonial county: Cheshire
- Region: North West
- Country: England
- Sovereign state: United Kingdom
- Post town: WARRINGTON
- Postcode district: WA2, WA3
- Dialling code: 01925
- Police: Cheshire
- Fire: Cheshire
- Ambulance: North West
- UK Parliament: Warrington North

Croft is a village and civil parish in Borough of Warrington, Cheshire, England, about four miles north of Warrington town centre. At the 2001 census it had a population of 2,920. It is a semi-rural, residential district.

== Geography ==
Within the boundaries of the historic county of Lancashire, the village is on the northern edge of the borough of Warrington, north of the interchange of the M6 and M62 motorways, known as the Croft Interchange. It is close to the border with Merseyside and Greater Manchester. It borders Culcheth to the east, Lowton to the north, Winwick to the west and Risley to the south.

Croft was struck by an F1/T3 tornado on 23 November 1981, as part of the record-breaking nationwide tornado outbreak on that day. The tornado later moved over Warrington town centre.

== Community ==
There are two churches, two primary schools, and a large playing field with children's play equipment area on the village green. Other facilities include a youth centre, horse riding, a golf range, and a bowling green.

Croft Village Football team produced three players that went on to remarkable professional careers. Roger Hunt played for Croft and later went on to play for Liverpool, and was part of England's World Cup winning team in 1966. Tommy Lawrence played for Liverpool and Scotland. Johnny Green played alongside Jimmy Armfield at Blackpool.

== Transport ==
The 19 bus serves Croft, on a route between Leigh via Culcheth and Warrington via Winwick. There is also a service to Birchwood. Government plans to build the [HS2] high speed rail line through Croft have been withdrawn.

== Demography ==
At the 2001 census, Croft had the following demographics:

- 871 households
- 2,920 residents
  - 61.7% are male
  - 38.3% are female
  - Average age of residents: 40.26 years (mean)
  - 2,014 residents describe their health as good

== Events ==
Croft Carnival is held annually, usually on the first Saturday of July, and features local talent, business and exhibitions. The event ends with an athletics competition, followed by an egg-throwing competition. In 2020 and 2021 this event was cancelled due to the risk of COVID-19. They also have a Royal Air Force Air Cadets (RAFAC) Squadron across the road from the primary school.

== See also ==
- Listed buildings in Croft, Cheshire
- Christ Church, Croft
