= Warrington's Own Buses =

Cheshire municipal bus operator

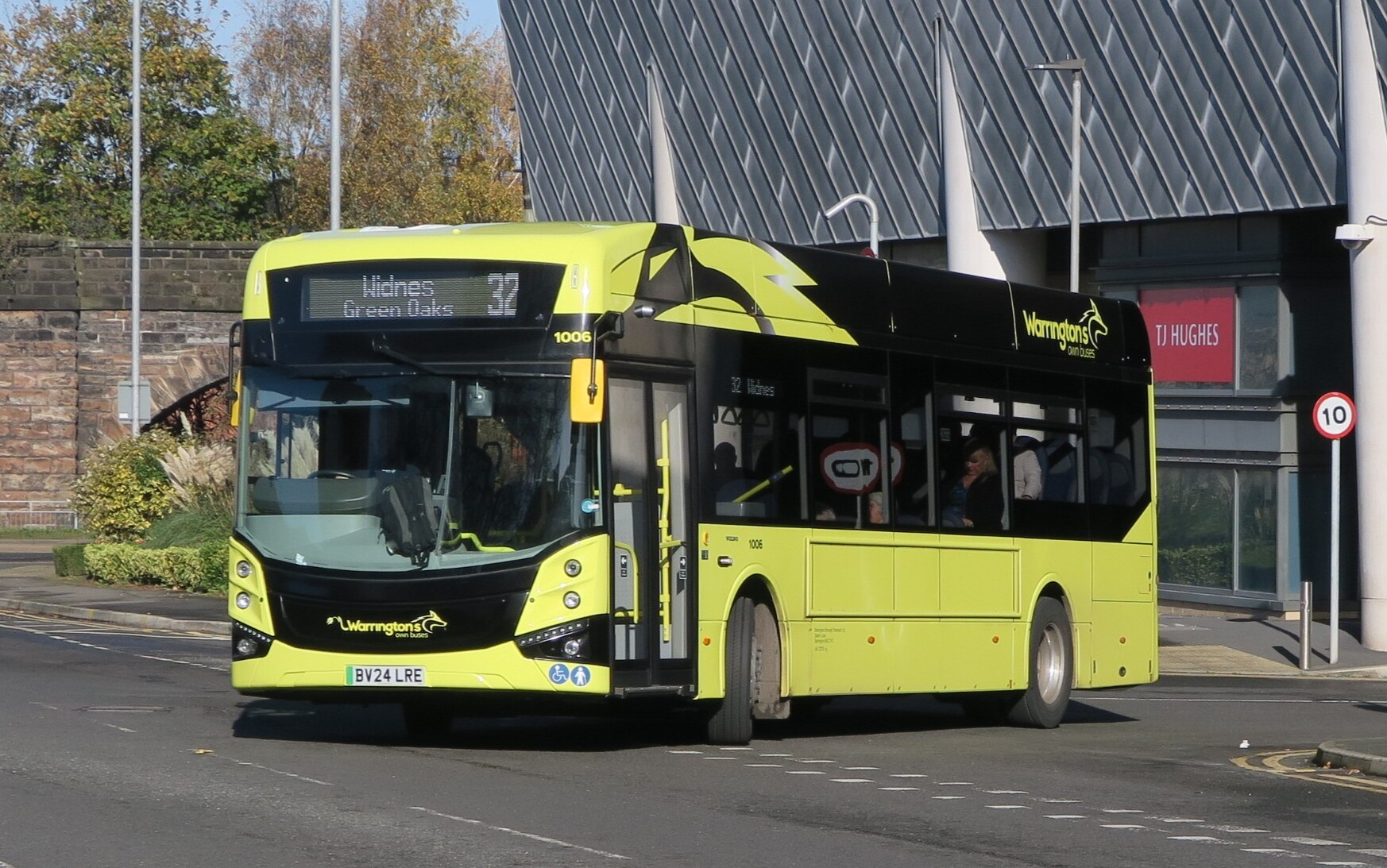
- MCV bodied Volvo BZL battery electric bus departing Warrington Bus Interchange in October 2024
- Parent: Warrington Borough Council
- Founded: 1902; 124 years ago
- Headquarters: Dallam Lane; Warrington, Cheshire
- Service area: Cheshire; Greater Manchester; Merseyside
- Service type: Bus services
- Fleet: 111 (November 2025)
- Chief executive: Ben Wakerley
- Website: Official website

Warrington's Own Buses is a municipal bus company which operates a network of services within the Borough of Warrington and the surrounding area, including Altrincham, Leigh, Earlestown, Wigan, Halton and Northwich.

The company previously traded as Warrington Borough Transport up until 2006 and as Network Warrington between 2006 and 2018. With the launch of the 'Cheshire Cats' brand in 2018, the company rebranded as Warrington's Own Buses.

== History ==
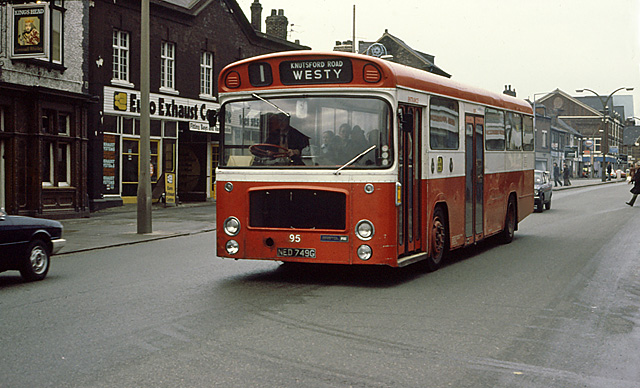
Warrington Corporation Transport East Lancashire Coachbuilders bodied Bristol RE in March 1980

Warrington Corporation Tramways started operating a network of five radial tramways from the town centre in 1902, with the first motor bus service starting in 1913. Buses replaced trams on routes starting in 1931, with the infrastructure starting to require major renewal which could not be justified economically. The last tram operated in 1935.

Services expanded rapidly after the Second World War as new housing estates grew in areas such as Orford and Great Sankey. The conversion of bus routes with conductors into one-man operated services began in 1965.

Warrington was designated as a new town in 1968, which led to new housing estates planned in the Birchwood and Westbrook areas of town. As such, Warrington Borough Council Transport Department started operating new services to these new developments as they started to grow in the 1970s and beyond. The department also began operating new services jointly with Crosville upon the split of the old Stockport based North Western Road Car Company in 1972.

=== Warrington Bus War ===
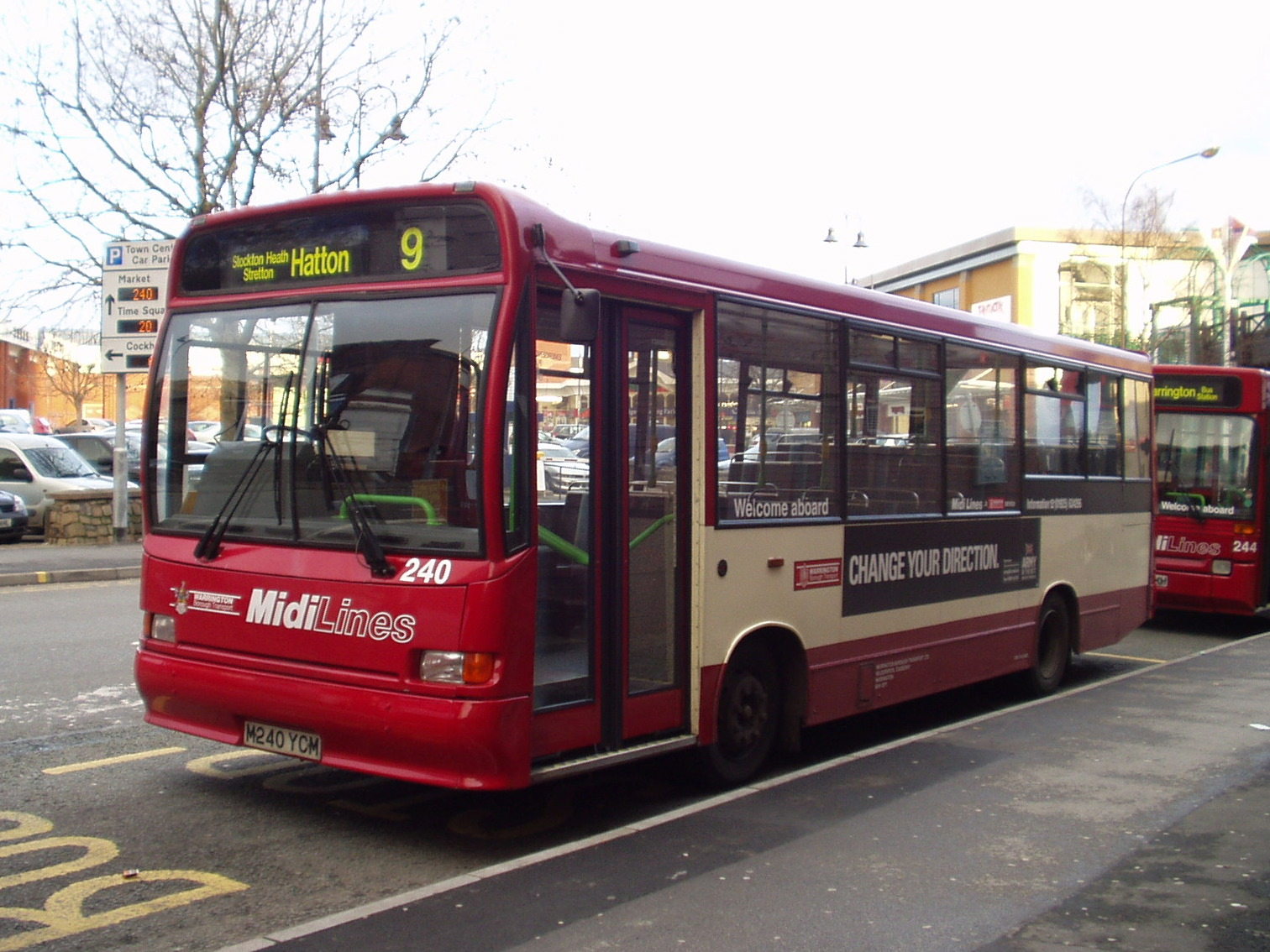
'MidiLines' branded Marshall C37 bodied Dennis Dart in December 2007

To comply with the Transport Act 1985 and the ensuing deregulation of bus services, Warrington Borough Transport was incorporated in 1986. The company's mission was that if money could be made by operating services deemed uneconomic by other operators, then it should assume operation. This policy led to an increase in services operated as other bus companies who ran into the area decided to concentrate on their own core areas.

Competition from other operators flared up in 1995, with Warrington Goldlines, part of the North Western bus company, duplicating the vast majority of the existing bus network. Merseybus' Lancashire Travel subsidiary competed with Warrington to a lesser extent, focusing on a core of 4-5 routes in the Callands and Westbrook areas near its St Helens depot in the South West of the town. In retaliation to MTL & North Western, Warrington Borough Transport commenced operating services to places such as Wigan, St Helens, Widnes, Runcorn, Chester and Liverpool, as well as commencing a local minibus service in Northwich, receiving support from neighbouring fellow municipal Halton Transport. This level of competition reduced by autumn 1996: after MTL withdrew its Warrington services, North Western's Warrington operations were also scaled back, removing the source of most of Warrington Borough Transport's competition.

After eighteen months of intense competition, both companies agreed a truce. Warrington Borough Transport kept routes to Prescot and St Helens, whilst giving up operations in the Birchwood area of town, which were operated by North Western. North Western was rebranded as Arriva North West in 1997.

In February 2002, Arriva North West decided to close its depot in Warrington and transferred the interurban routes to depots in Liverpool and St Helens. Warrington Borough Transport resumed operation of town routes to Birchwood, Cinnamon Brow and Woolston, but transferred the St Helens route back to Arriva. Further withdrawals by Arriva led to the takeover of routes to Leigh in 2005 and Altrincham in 2006.

=== Rebranding ===
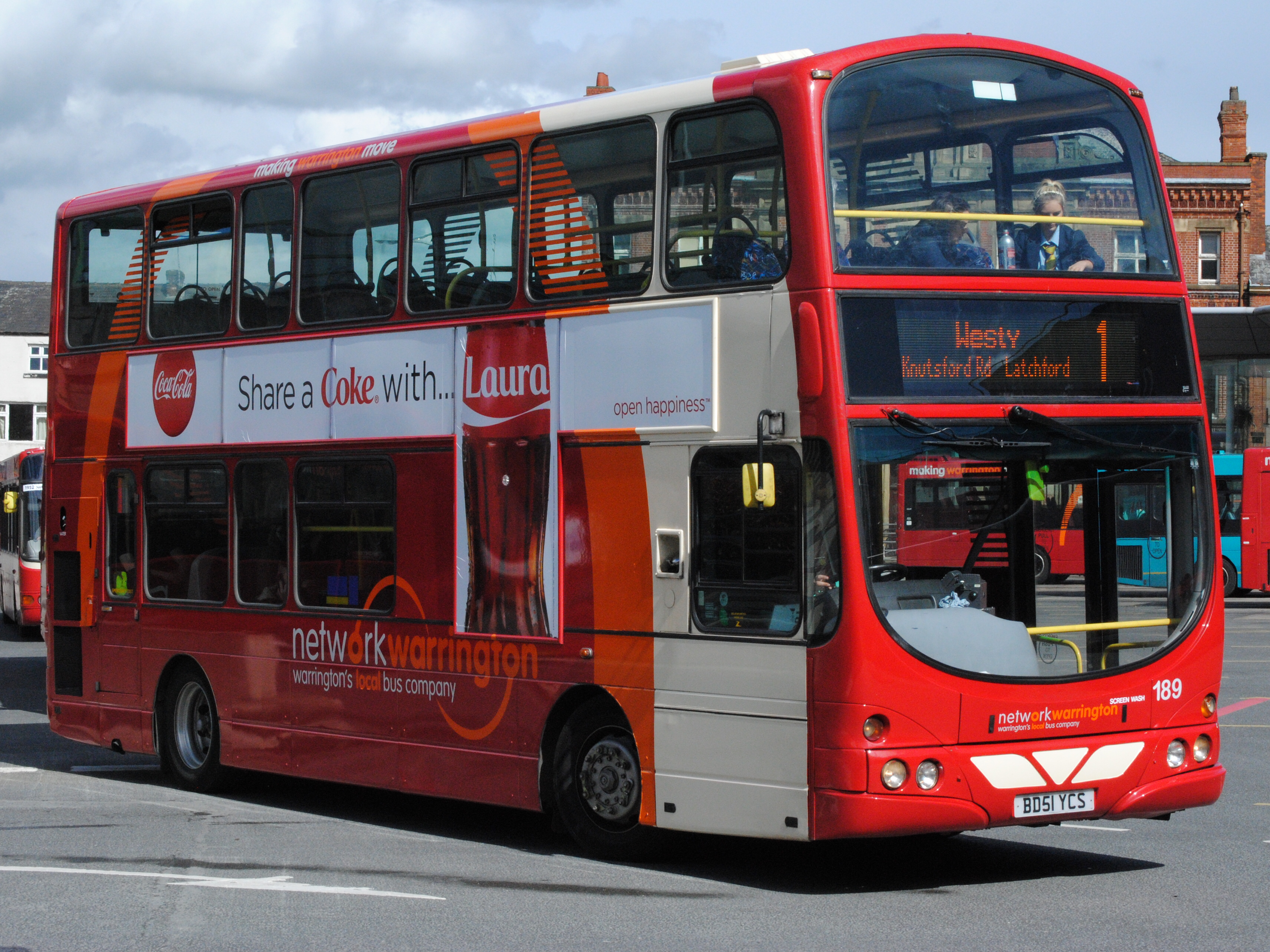
Network Warrington Wright Eclipse Gemini bodied Volvo B7TL at Warrington Bus Interchange in May 2013

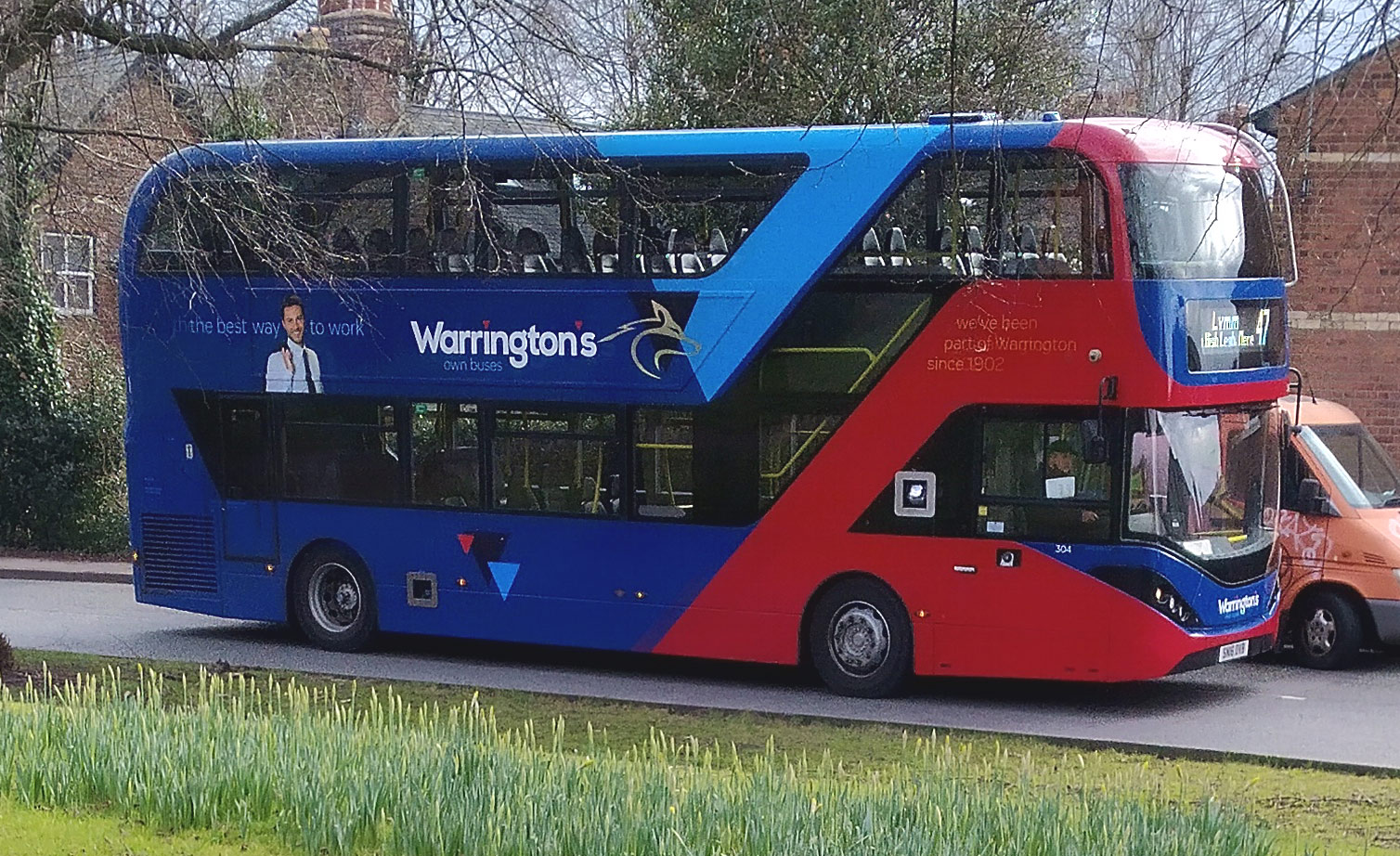
Alexander Dennis Enviro400 City approaching Knutsford bus station in March 2021

In 2006, the company was rebranded and became known as Network Warrington, with a new livery featuring fluorescent orange graphics designed by Samantha Beeley introduced onto the operator's bus fleet. This rebrand coincided with a streamlining of other routes, both long distance and in the town centre, which were operated with increased frequencies to shorten journey times.

Budget cuts by Warrington Borough Council resulted in evening services being reduced and Sunday evening services being completely withdrawn from 27 June 2010, as these services no longer received any subsidy from the council.

In April 2018, the company was rebranded as Warrington's Own Buses, with buses adopting a stylised wolf logo and a livery of both bright and deep shades of red and blue. Coinciding with the introduction of 105 new battery electric buses to the fleet in 2024, Warrington's Own Buses replaced this livery with a yellow and black scheme intended to harmonise with the yellow and black franchised buses of Transport for Greater Manchester's Bee Network and the Liverpool City Region's Metro network, giving the effect of a harmonised bus network serving North West England.

== Depot ==
The main depot and offices for Warrington's Own Buses are located in a new depot opposite the Halliwell Jones Stadium on Dallam Lane, which opened in April 2023. Constructed as the second of seven Town Deal projects with central government 'levelling-up' funding, the depot is equipped with chargers to support the fleet of 105 electric buses soon to replace the operator's diesel buses, and the site is partially powered by solar panels at a Warrington Borough Council solar farm in Cirencester.

The Travel Centre on the main concourse at Warrington Bus Interchange provides for season ticket sales and information. Other facilities are located here for driving and supervisory staff maintaining the daily operational procedures of the buses and route operations.

=== Former ===
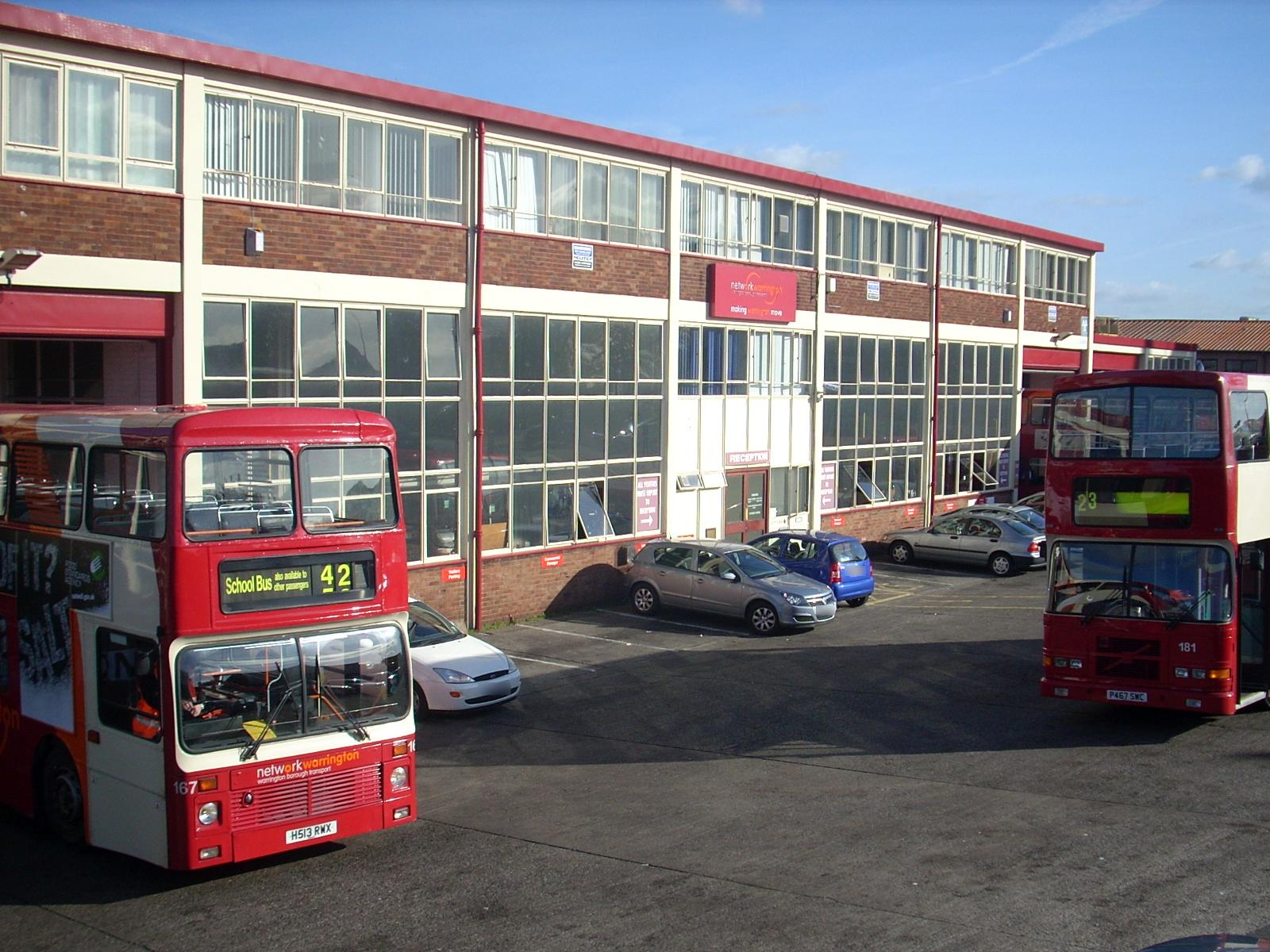
The frontage of the former bus depot on Wilderspool Causeway

The old bus depot was Wilderspool Causeway. The two main sheds to the rear of the site were originally built in 1943 for Fairey Aviation and used to assemble wings for their Fulmar bomber until they were purchased by Warrington Corporation in 1947. This site eventually became the main operational centre, with the frontage of the depot dating from 1964. The ground floor consisted of a reception area and vehicle inspection bays, with the company's offices located on the upper floor.

The depot's location next to the old Wilderspool Stadium and close to the town centre led to interest from developers in redeveloping the site of the depot and the stadium during 2006. As part of this, a new depot would have been constructed at the nearby Centre Park business park, located on the other side of the Mersey but still close to Warrington town centre. Whilst Warrington Borough Transport were reported to be seriously considering the proposed move, the scheme never moved beyond the drawing board and foundered around the end of the year having failed to gain favour with council planning officers. Wilderspool Causeway depot closed with the opening of the new Dallam Lane depot in April 2023, with demolition of the site commencing in September to allow development on the site.

Warrington's original tram system was operated from an eight-track depot at the junction of Mersey Street and Lower Bank Street. A purpose built bus garage was constructed on Lower Bank Street in 1930, although buses were also housed in the old tram sheds following the withdrawal of trams. Despite the move to the new Wilderspool garage, the old staff canteen on Lower Bank Street remained in use until the opening of the new bus station in 1979. The building was demolished in 1981 and is today the site of a DW Sports Fitness club.

== Fleet ==
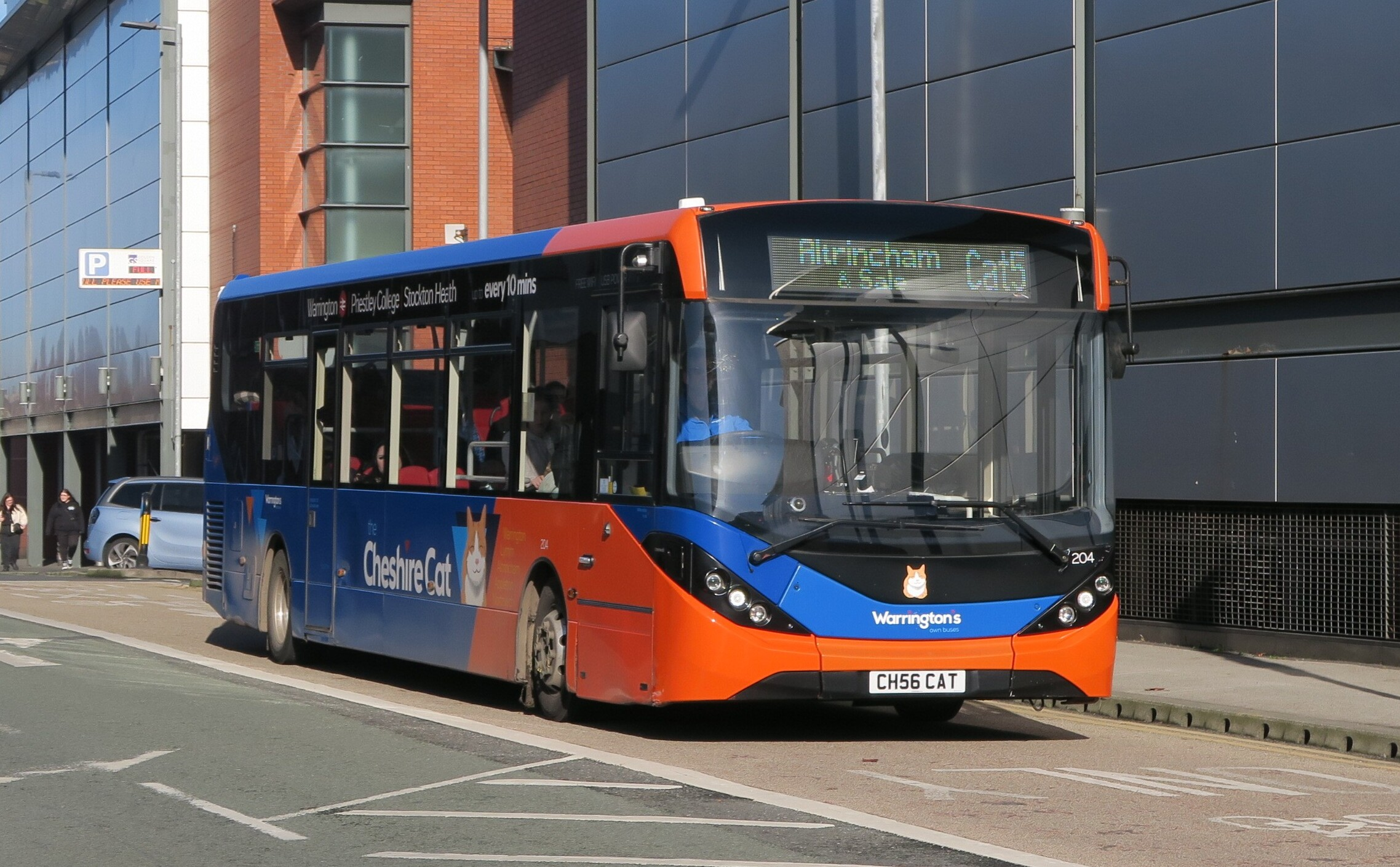
'The Cheshire Cat'-branded Alexander Dennis Enviro200 MMC in October 2024

As of November 2025, the Warrington's Own Buses fleet consists of 111 vehicles.

Warrington Borough Council secured £21.5 million of funding from the central government's Zero Emission Bus Regional Areas (ZEBRA) scheme to replace the entire Warrington's Own Buses fleet with 105 Volvo BZL single and double-decker battery electric buses bodied by MCV Bus and Coach. Following a launch event held by council leaders in March 2024, the first of these buses began to enter service from July 2024 onwards.

=== Route brands ===
After the Warrington's Own Buses identity was introduced in 2018, the company introduced a range of dedicated route liveries. These include:

- Connect17 – routes 17/17A.
- The Cheshire Cat – routes CAT5, CAT6, CAT7, CAT8 and CAT9 (including variants).
- The Pops – routes 20/21.
- Blueline – route 32

The special branding has since been removed after the company's electric bus transition, including the de-branding of the Cheshire Cat buses to just their number variants. However, remnants of the branding can still be seen at bus stops across the network.

== See also ==
- Transport in Warrington
- List of preserved Warrington buses
