= Dog-leg (stairs) =

Architectural configuration of stairway

Note: A Dog-Leg staircase and Quarter-Turn staircase are similar but different things. Currently there is no article for Quarter-Turn and Dog-leg stairs had Quarter-Turn's information.

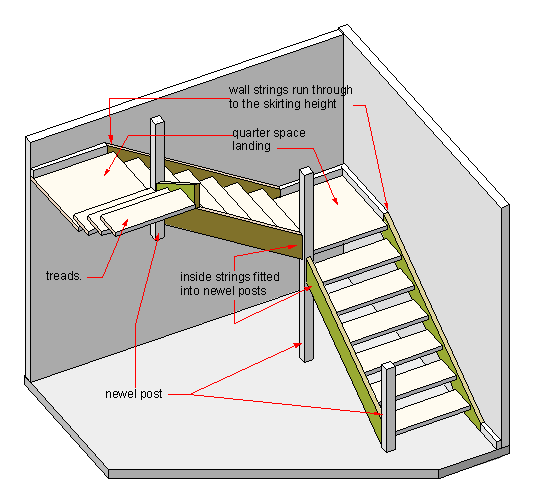
A quarter-turn staircase

A Quarter-Turn is a configuration of stairs between two floors of a building, often a domestic building, in which a flight of stairs ascends to a quarter-landing before turning at a right angle and continuing upwards. The flights do not have to be equal in length. A dog-leg contrasts with a quarter-turn in that after the landing it turns 180-degree turn to go back up the next set of stairs.

Dog-leg stairs can but not necessarily have an open-well stair which encircles an empty space in the middle of the stairs. But Quarter-turn stairs do.

Structurally, the flights of a dog-leg stair are usually supported by the half-landing, which spans the adjoining flank walls. It is called a "half or quarter" based on how much of turn you must make out of a 360-degree circle.

From the design point of view, the main advantages of a quarter-turn and dog-leg stair are:

- To allow an arrangement that occupies a shorter, though wider, floor area than a straight flight, and so is more compact. Even though the landings consume more total floor space, there is no large single dimension.
- The upper floor is not directly visible from the bottom of the stairs, thereby providing more privacy.

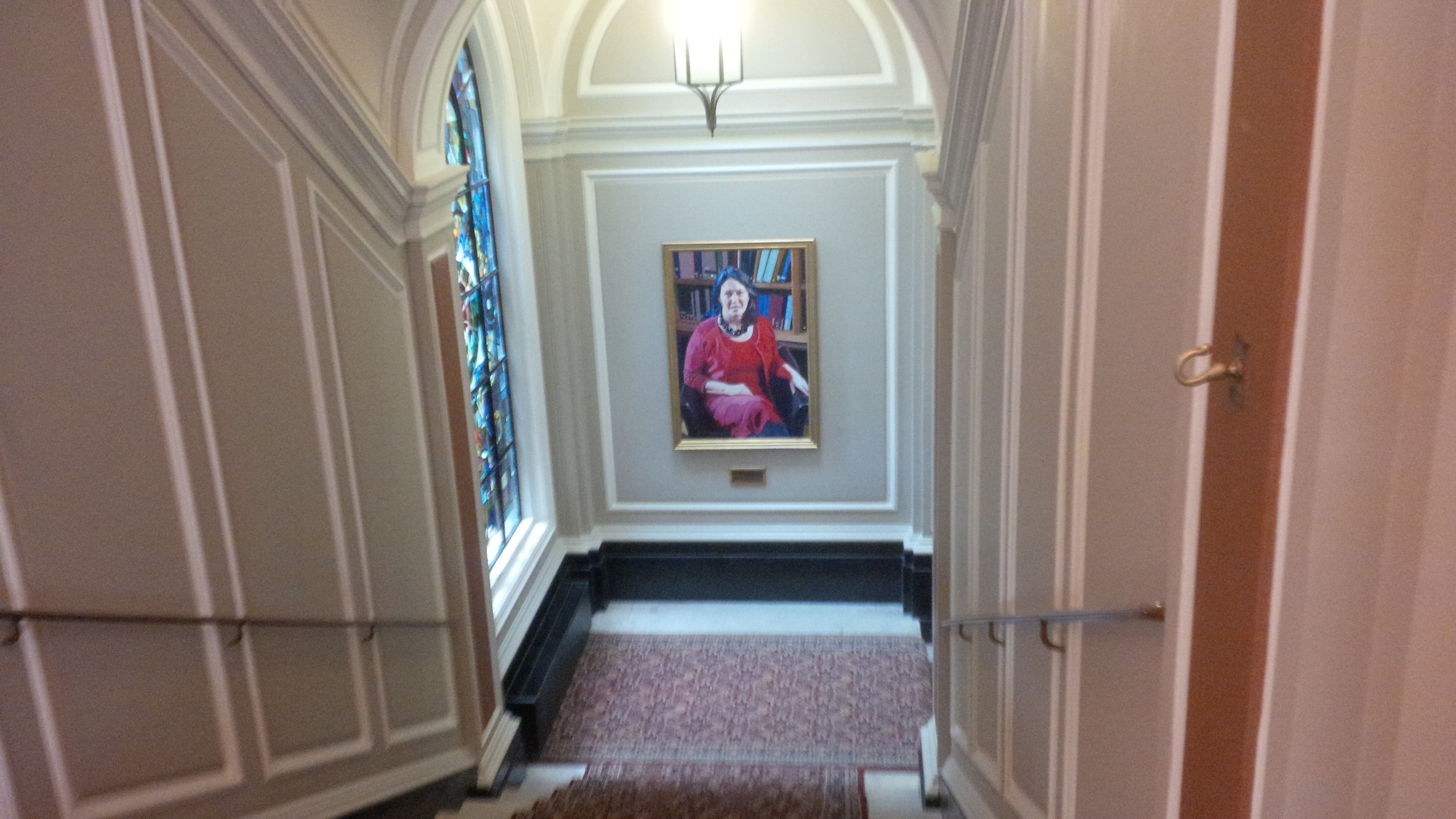
A quarter-turn staircase showing the quarter landing, is made into an architectural feature, by the use of arches and stained glass. The handrail stops at the landing area, rather than going across the window and the portrait.

As with any stairs, when a quarter-turn or dog-leg stairway will be used by young children, elderly people, or disabled people, the handrail should be continuous throughout the entire area, including on the landing. However, depending on the other design elements, it may be difficult to provide an aesthetically pleasing and uninterrupted handrail on both sides of these types of stairs.
