= Westy =

Coordinates: 53.3839°N 2.5566°W

- Location within Cheshire
- Population: 6,125 (2001)
- OS grid reference: SJ628875
- Unitary authority: Warrington
- Ceremonial county: Cheshire
- Region: North West
- Country: England
- Sovereign state: United Kingdom
- Post town: Warrington
- Postcode district: WA4
- Dialling code: 01925
- Police: Cheshire
- Fire: Cheshire
- Ambulance: North West
- UK Parliament: Warrington North

Westy is a suburban district in Warrington, England. It lies between the River Mersey and the Manchester Ship Canal. The village of Westy is a suburban area, itself unofficially a suburb of Latchford. The area features mainly inter-war council housing, however some of these homes are now privately owned. There is an apparent strong community spirit with its hub at the community centre and also a thriving community hall based within St Margaret's Community Centre on Lindley Avenue, hosting activities for all age groups.
