= Dallam, Warrington =

Suburb of Warrington, Cheshire, England

Coordinates: 53.407°N 2.608°W

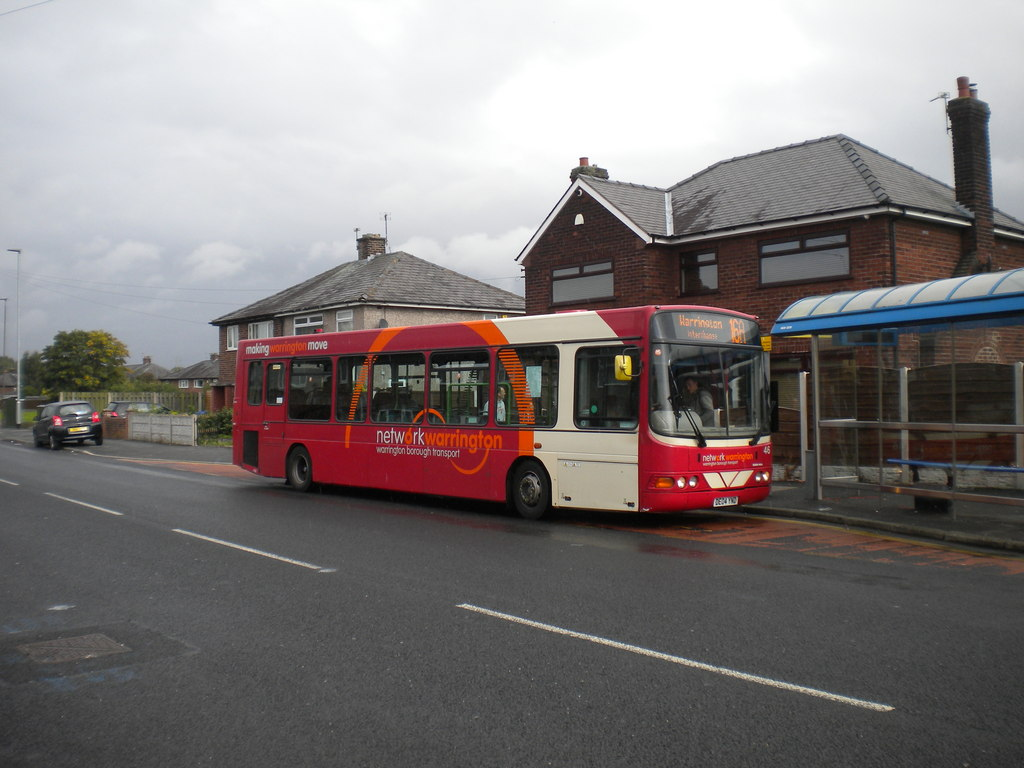
Bus on Longshaw Street, Dallam

Dallam is a suburb of Warrington, in the Warrington district, in the ceremonial county of Cheshire, England. It was historically in Lancashire but is now in Cheshire. It is home to a Royal Mail rail terminus on the main West Coast Main Line railway, opposite a large Eddie Stobart distribution centre. Most housing is former council housing. It is situated at the terminus of the Warrington Borough Transport number 16 and 16A bus routes.
