= A574 road =

Road in England

A574

Route information
- Length: 13 mi (21 km)

Major junctions
- From: Sankey Bridges, Warrington (A57); 53.4032°N 2.5734°W
- M62; A57; A49; A50 A580
- To: Butts Bridge, Leigh (A572); 53.4921°N 2.4991°W

Location
- Country: United Kingdom
- Constituent country: England

Road network
- Roads in the United Kingdom; Motorways; A and B road zones

The A574 is a road in England, running through the borough of Warrington before terminating at the end of Butts Bridge in Leigh. The route covers a distance of approximately 13 miles (21 km) and links Warrington town centre with the outer suburbs of Birchwood and Sankey.

The road passes through the following districts of Warrington and Leigh (in route order):

- Sankey Bridges (Start of route)
- Old Hall
- Westbrook
- Callands
- Longford
- Orford
- Padgate
- Longbarn
- Birchwood
- Locking Stumps
- Risley
- Culcheth
- Glazebury
- Hope Carr (End of route)

Being in the new part of Warrington, the road is renowned for its numerous roundabouts—26 in all, the first one less than 1/2 mile (0.80 km) from the start and the last about 1 mile (1.6 km) from the terminus.
