= Bruche, Warrington =

Suburb of Warrington, Cheshire, England

Coordinates: 53.400°N 2.564°W

Bruche is a large suburb of Warrington, in the Warrington district, in the traditional county of Lancashire, England.

It forms the old border of Poulton and Warrington.

In 2005 it was home to the Bruche Police Training Centre, a national police training centre.

It changed from Bruch sometime before 1888. You can still see the old name on the bridge over Padgate Brook.
