= Padgate =

Suburb of Warrington, Cheshire, England

Coordinates: 53.41°N 2.56°W

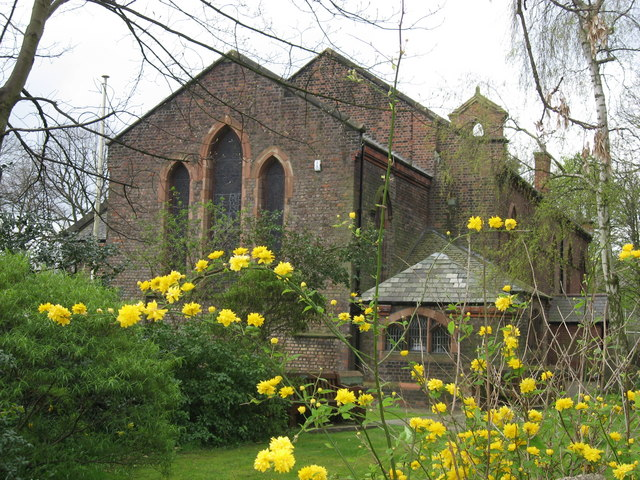
- Christ Church

- Location within Cheshire
- Civil parish: Poulton-with-Fearnhead
- Unitary authority: Warrington
- Ceremonial county: Cheshire
- Region: North West
- Country: England
- Sovereign state: United Kingdom
- Post town: WARRINGTON
- Postcode district: WA1, WA2
- Dialling code: 01925
- UK Parliament: Warrington North

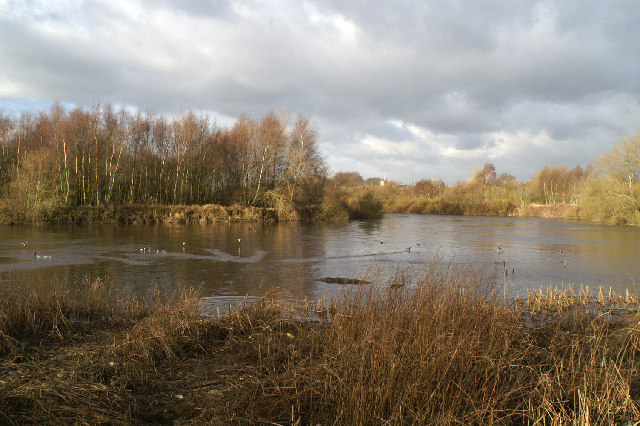
River Mersey in Padgate

Padgate is a suburb of the town of Warrington, in the civil parish of Poulton-with-Fearnhead, in the Warrington district, in the ceremonial county of Cheshire, England.

== History ==
=== Overview ===
Historically part of Lancashire, until 1838 Padgate was an area of farmland in the Fearnhead district. It was only with the establishment of a parish and the building of Christ Church Padgate that a recognisable community arose.

Following boundary changes in 1974, Padgate, along with the rest of Warrington, became part of the county of Cheshire. It is now a largely residential, suburban district. It was the site of an R.A.F training camp and home of a teacher training college, now the Padgate Campus of the University of Chester.

Padgate has a railway station, three churches, a number of schools, a community centre and, next to the railway line, a large area of land and playing fields known as Bennett's Recreation Ground. This was the home of the Woolston Rovers rugby league side and also the Cheshire Cadets Drum and Bugle Corps with their headquarters Kennedy Hall. This is also home to Greenall's Padgate St Oswald's reserves football team of the Mid Cheshire Football League reserve division. Greenall's Padgate St Oswald's first team play at Tetley Walker's Club, Long Lane, Warrington.

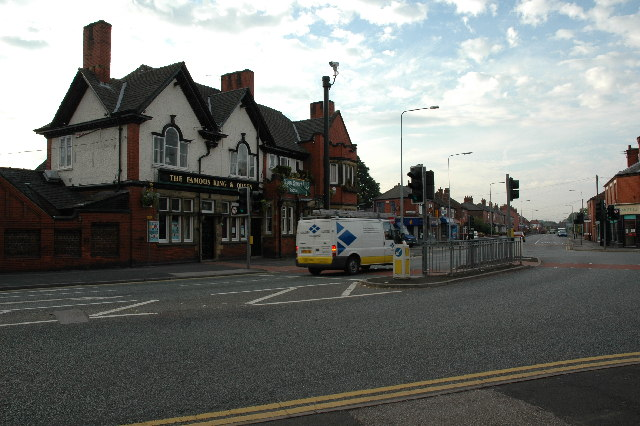
The Famous King and Queen pub

The centre of Padgate (the area around the railway station, Christ Church and the community centre) is separated from the main commercial centre by Padgate Lane, which connects the two, approximately three quarters of a mile apart.

Padgate is in the parliamentary constituency of Warrington North.

Geographically the area is on the east side of Warrington. It is north of the River Mersey and enclosed to the east by the M6 motorway. Topographically the land in the area is flat, being in the Mersey valley.

Padgate Brook, a tributary of the Mersey, runs to the western edge of Padgate, and is in turn fed by numerous smaller waterways (Spittle Brook, Blackbrook, Spa Brook, Cinnamon Brook, Cross Brook, Cockshot Burn) originating in Peel Hall Meadows and other outlying rural stretches of land to the north. To the east, Birchwood Brook also feeds the Mersey.

=== RAF Station ===
During the Second World War, Padgate had a small RAF Station. It was used as a training camp for National Servicemen after the war. The camp was built on the site of a former Quaker Farm, the entrance to which was situated on Station Road.

The site of the former RAF station was demolished in the mid-to-late 1970s, and has since been largely covered by a housing estate, bordered by Bennett's Rec and the railway line to the south, Fearnhead to the north-east, and Blackbrook and Cinnamon Brow to the north. Padgate Academy is also sited on this land.

The main entrance to the RAF camp was on what is now Station Road North. Although the RAF site is now largely invisible its legacy lives on in local place names – Insall Road running east–west in parallel to the A574 is named after the one-time commanding officer of the site, and the local high school was known from 2009 to 2013 as Lysander Community High, the Westland Lysander being one of the aircraft linked to the former RAF base.

Remnants of the camp's presence can still be seen in some parts of the land, for example the brickwork from the rifle range can still be seen close to the railway footbridge in the south-west corner of the former site.

=== University of Chester Padgate Campus ===
The university campus (which despite being known as the Padgate Campus is in fact in the neighbouring village of Fearnhead) belonging to the University of Chester was used as a camp for Canadian servicemen during the Second World War. In 1946, it became a teacher training college and in the late 1960s was re-named to Padgate College of Education. In honour of the historical usage, part of the site was named Canada Hall.

The campus is now home to 384 students. A variety of degree courses are on offer, including degrees in journalism and sport-related subjects. The campus houses an SU bar named bar twenty ten. There are 8 halls of residence and also a residential cul-de-sac called College Close.

The University of Chester announced the closure of the campus on 22 January 2021 outlining intentions to relocate teaching to buildings in Warrington town centre.

== Geography ==
Five kilometres (3 mi) east of Warrington town centre, Padgate lies between the Liverpool and Greater Manchester urban areas. It is 35 kilometres (22 mi) east of Liverpool, 26 kilometres (16 mi) west of Manchester, and 47 kilometres (29 mi) northeast of Chester. The suburb is crossed to the south by the river Mersey and is close to the Manchester Ship Canal. A small tributary of the Mersey, Padgate Brook, runs through it roughly north–south, joining the Mersey to the south.

== Main sights ==
Its parish church, Christ Church (1838), is a listed building, the former rectory (built approximately 2 years later) associated with the church is locally listed. Christ Church has an affiliated Church of England Primary School nearby which also dates, in its present form, from around the same time. In 2016, work commenced on the building of a new vicarage in the grounds adjacent to the church. This new vicarage became the residence of the vicar in early 2017, and the old rectory is now a private residence.

There are two other churches in the area: Padgate Methodist Church and St. Oswald's Roman Catholic Church.

== Transport ==
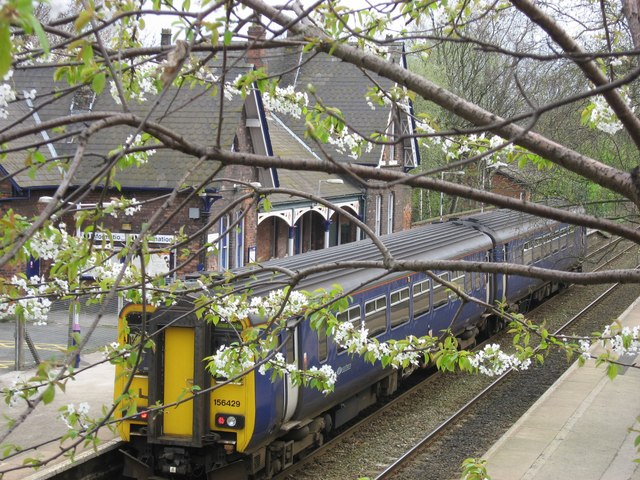
Padgate railway station

Padgate has an unstaffed railway station on the Manchester-Liverpool line served by the local stopping service. Up until the mid-1970s, the station was fully staffed and a row of cottages (still extant) next to the station were designed as residences for the station staff.

The M6 motorway is located some km east, and nearest exit is "Warrington-Irlam-A57". The A roads serving Padgate are the A50, A57 and A574.

== See also ==
- Padgate Academy
- Listed buildings in Poulton-with-Fearnhead
