= Murder of Brianna Ghey =

2023 murder in Warrington, England

- Ghey in an undated photograph released by Cheshire Constabulary
- Location of the park where the stabbing occurred (red)
- Location: Culcheth Linear Park, Borough of Warrington, Cheshire, England
- Date: 11 February 2023
- Attack type: Murder by stabbing, hate crime
- Weapon: Hunting knife
- Victim: Brianna Ghey
- Perpetrators: Scarlett Jenkinson; Eddie Ratcliffe
- Motive: Sadism and transphobia
- Verdict: Guilty
- Convictions: Murder
- Sentence: Jenkinson: Detained at His Majesty's pleasure, with a minimum of 22 years Ratcliffe: Detained at His Majesty's pleasure, with a minimum of 20 years

On 11 February 2023, Brianna Ghey (/dʒaɪ/ JEYE), a 16-year-old English transgender girl, was murdered in a premeditated attack by Scarlett Jenkinson and Eddie Ratcliffe. After being lured into Culcheth Linear Park by Jenkinson, Ghey was fatally stabbed.

Jenkinson and Ratcliffe, both aged 15 at the time, were arrested the day after the attack, and were eventually charged with murder. The pair were convicted on 20 December 2023 at Manchester Crown Court and were sentenced on 2 February 2024 to be detained at His Majesty's pleasure, with a minimum of 22 years for Jenkinson and 20 years for Ratcliffe, before being eligible for parole. The court concluded that the offence was primarily motivated by sadistic tendencies and that transphobia was a secondary motive for Ratcliffe.

== Background ==
=== Brianna Ghey ===
Brianna Ghey (/dʒaɪ/ JY; 7 November 2006 – 11 February 2023) was a 16-year-old transgender girl and a Year 11 pupil at Birchwood Community High School in the Birchwood area of Warrington.

As a teenager, Ghey was diagnosed with attention deficit hyperactivity disorder and autism, which her mother said impaired her ability to identify dangerous situations, as well as anxiety. These diagnoses also meant that Ghey did not participate in regular lessons and required one-on-one tutoring in her school's inclusion room, where Ghey eventually met Jenkinson.

According to her friends, Ghey often helped younger transgender girls to safely and legally get transgender hormone therapy. She reportedly faced years of transphobic harassment and bullying, including at school, a part of which was being repeatedly "gang beaten". However, in a statement reportedly approved by Ghey's mother, Birchwood's headteacher denied that Ghey had faced bullying at school.

Ghey was a TikToker, with her number of followers variously reported as 11,000, 31,000, and 63,000. On TikTok, she mimed and danced to popular songs. One of her final TikToks said that she was "excluded from school". After her death, her TikTok account was deleted.

=== Perpetrators ===
Scarlett Jenkinson and Eddie Ratcliffe
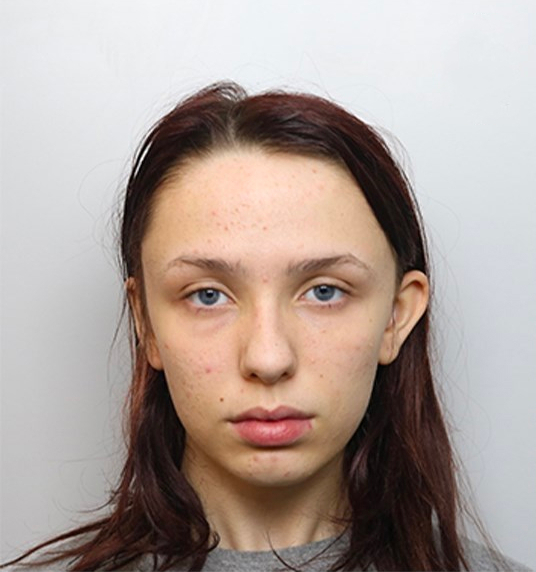
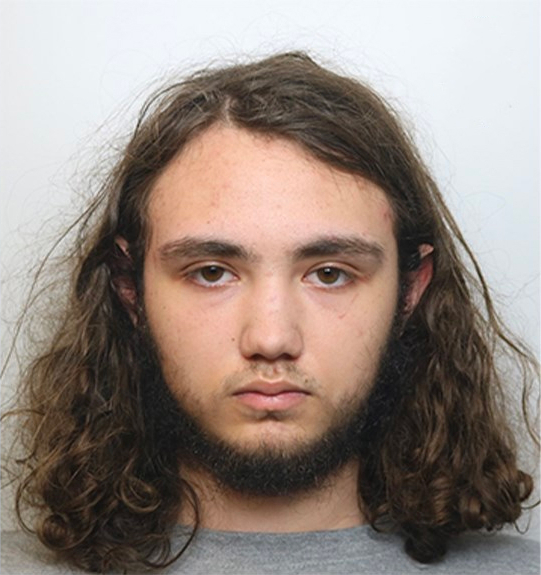
- Custody photographs of Jenkinson (left) and Ratcliffe (right) taken after their arrest
- Education: Culcheth High School (both)
- Occupation: Students

Details
- Date: 11 February 2023
- Location: Culcheth Linear Park
- Target: Brianna Ghey
- Killed: 1

Scarlett Jenkinson had attended Culcheth High School alongside Ratcliffe. She faced permanent exclusion after an incident on 27 September 2022, in which she brought cannabidiol-infused edibles into school, giving them to a younger classmate, who then fell ill. The incident, which police recorded as a spiking, occurred four months before Jenkinson would first attempt to murder Ghey, by poisoning her with ibuprofen tablets.

As an alternative to exclusion, Jenkinson was allowed to transfer to Birchwood, where she met and formed a friendship with Ghey. In text messages with Ratcliffe, Jenkinson revealed that she was obsessed with Ghey. In an interview with Richard Church, a child psychiatrist, Jenkinson stated that she felt as if she were about to lose Ghey as a friend, and that she wanted to "kill her so she would always be with her".

Before the murder, Jenkinson displayed a fascination with serial killers, watching documentaries and keeping notes about notorious killers, including Jeffrey Dahmer and John Wayne Gacy. She reportedly used the Tor browser to access videos of torture and murder on the dark web.

Eddie Ratcliffe, a pupil at Culcheth High School at the time of the murder, was described by a fellow student as a role model who achieved top grades. Ratcliffe first met Jenkinson in school at age 11. In 2018, he competed at a kickboxing championship organised by ISKA in Jamaica as an amateur kickboxer.

Described in one of Jenkinson's notebooks as intelligent but socially awkward, Ratcliffe was known to be a loner. According to neighbours, he never showed any signs of violence prior to the murder. Ratcliffe had a fascination with knives and also collected blades; he bought the hunting knife used for the murder during a skiing trip to Bulgaria.

== Murder ==
On the morning of 11 February 2023, Ghey was messaged by Jenkinson, instructing her to take a bus to Culcheth Library later that afternoon. At 12:45 pm, Ghey was captured on a doorbell camera leaving her house in Birchwood. While leaving, Ghey messaged her mother about meeting up with Jenkinson. Following Jenkinson's directions, Ghey walked 25 minutes to the Birchwood railway station and boarded a bus at 1:38 pm, after which she texted her mother.

At 1:53 pm, Ghey met with Jenkinson and her friend Eddie Ratcliffe, whom Ghey had not met before, at the bus stop outside the library. At 2:02 pm, they were last seen on CCTV heading towards Culcheth Linear Park, where multiple eyewitnesses saw them walking together. Exchanging messages on Snapchat, Ghey, whom Jenkinson had lured under the impression that they were going to take drugs, sent a message to Jenkinson at 2:15 pm, "Girl, Ima wait where I am until we have drugs lol. I'm too anxious." Jenkinson, posing as a fake dealer on Snapchat, exchanged messages with herself arranging meeting plans. At 2:30 pm, Ghey, having grown suspicious of Jenkinson, messaged a friend "Scarlett is so weird girl. I think she's pretending to have a deeler [sic]." Afterwards, Ghey was attacked with a hunting knife.

Jenkinson and Ratcliffe were spotted from a distance by a woman walking her dog with her husband in the park. After realising they had been noticed, they fled the scene. The couple then discovered Ghey's body, face-down and bleeding heavily, and called emergency services at 3:13 pm. At 4:02 pm, Ghey was pronounced dead by paramedics at the scene.

== Investigation ==
A Home Office postmortem was ordered to determine the cause of death. The examination found that Ghey had been stabbed 28 times, across her head, neck, chest, and back. Prosecutor Leanne Gallagher would later describe the attack on Ghey as "extremely brutal and punishing".

On 12 February 2023, Ratcliffe from Leigh and Jenkinson from Warrington, both 15, were arrested simultaneously at their homes by Cheshire Constabulary. Detective Chief Superintendent Mike Evans described the killing as a targeted attack, though initially reported that "there is no evidence to suggest that the circumstances surrounding Brianna's death are hate related". On 14 February, police reported they were investigating "all lines of inquiry", including whether the attack had been a hate crime.

On 15 February, the suspects were charged with murder, refused bail and placed in youth detention. The next day, the suspects appeared, via video link, in a brief hearing at Liverpool Crown Court. At this hearing, judge David Aubrey remanded them in youth detention accommodation until a plea and trial preparation hearing on 2 May 2023. The accused were not required to enter a plea, and were remanded until a further hearing on 11 May. In a pre-trial hearing on 20 July 2023, one of the suspects entered a plea of not guilty. A further pre-trial hearing took place on 4 October 2023, during which the other suspect pleaded not guilty.

== Trial ==
The trial commenced at Manchester Crown Court on 27 November 2023. Due to the nature of the case, and the ages of those involved, reporting restrictions were put in place preventing the naming of both of the defendants, as well as any other children mentioned during the trial. During the trial, Jenkinson was referred to as Girl X, and Ratcliffe as Boy Y. The case was heard by Amanda Yip, who briefed 14 potential jurors on Ghey's transgender identity, reporting restrictions concerning the defendants, and other facts of the murder ahead of the trial.

=== Pretrial ===
While in custody, Jenkinson was found to have traits of autism and ADHD; Ratcliffe was diagnosed after arrest as autistic and as having selective mutism, resulting in an inability to speak to anyone except his mother. Reasonable accommodations were made for both of the accused during the trial. Due to his selective mutism, Ratcliffe was allowed to communicate with court by typing on a computer. Both perpetrators were given the option to participate in proceedings via a video link, rather than in person. The jury were also told that their "various degrees of neurodivergence" could affect the ways both Jenkinson and Ratcliffe might react or speak in the proceedings.

=== Prosecution case ===
The prosecution was led by Deanna Heer, with Cheryl Mottram acting as the junior barrister. The prosecution case opened in the afternoon of 27 November 2023, and concluded on 8 December 2023.

The prosecution presented text message evidence that Jenkinson had previously tried to poison Ghey using an excessive amount of ibuprofen, resulting in Ghey becoming extremely sick with what her mother had thought was appendicitis. Jenkinson poisoned her believing that the murder would be mistaken for a suicidal overdose due to Ghey's mental health struggles. After Ghey survived the attempt, the defendants planned to kill her by stabbing her with a hunting knife purchased by Ratcliffe. Prior to these attempts, text messages recorded Jenkinson as admitting to being obsessed with Ghey, calling her "really different" and "really pretty". Ratcliffe also stated over text messages that he wanted "to see if it [sic] will scream like a man or a girl".

=== Defence case ===
Both Jenkinson and Ratcliffe made separate defence cases. Richard Pratt led the defence case for Jenkinson, with Sarah Holt acting as junior. Richard Littler led the defence case for Ratcliffe, with Steven Swift acting as junior.

Each defendant placed the blame for the actual killing upon the other, arguing that they themselves were only accessories to the act.

Defence for Ratcliffe said that Jenkinson had told him to bring his hunting knife to the park, and that she "had a plan to stab Brianna". Ratcliffe further stated that he did not take Jenkinson's alleged plan seriously because she had a history of "always talking about murder and nothing happens". This allegedly ended with Jenkinson stabbing Ghey to death, which he saw. He denied holding any animosity towards Ghey regarding her trans identity. Ratcliffe's defence accused Jenkinson of manipulating him due to his autism.

Jenkinson's defence held that while she may have lured Ghey to the park where she was stabbed and come up with the plan in question, it was only done so as part of a "fantasy", and that it was Ratcliffe who carried out the stabbing to Jenkinson's "shock". She described herself as not stopping the act despite her surprise, due to being afraid of Ratcliffe, describing him as a "sociopath". Jenkinson's defence also pointed out how an excess amount of Ghey's blood was later found on Ratcliffe's clothing, while none was found on Jenkinson's.

=== Verdict and sentencing ===
The trial lasted three weeks, and concluded on 20 December 2023. Both defendants were found guilty of the murder of Ghey. Jury deliberations lasted for 4 hours and 40 minutes. Yip indicated that life sentences would be forthcoming. On 21 December 2023, Yip ruled that anonymity orders that protected the identities of the convicted murderers would be lifted and they would be named during the sentencing hearing.

On 2 February 2024, the sentencing hearing was held at Manchester Crown Court, before which the two teenagers were named; the judge determined that there was "a strong public interest in the full and unrestricted reporting of what is plainly an exceptional case". The sentencing hearing included victim impact statements from Ghey's parents and step-father. The court also heard updated assessments by psychiatrists of the perpetrators: Jenkinson has anti-social personality disorder rather than autism, and that Ratcliffe has a "mild" form of autism spectrum disorder.

Jenkinson was sentenced to be detained at His Majesty's pleasure with a minimum term of 22 years, and Ratcliffe was also detained at His Majesty's pleasure with a minimum term of 20 years. Jenkinson will be eligible to be considered for parole on 25 January 2044, while Ratcliffe will be eligible to be considered for parole on 25 January 2042.

In handing down the sentences, Yip described the murder as "sadistic in nature" and, referring to Ratcliffe, "where a secondary motive was hostility towards Ghey because of her transgender identity".

=== Trial aftermath ===
Speaking outside the Manchester Crown Court after the verdicts were issued, Ghey's mother Esther Ghey and father Peter Spooner gave statements to the media expressing grief and mourning the loss of their daughter. Despite remarking that the defendants seemed remorseless for the killing, Ghey's mother urged the public to show empathy for the families of the defendants.

After the trial, detective Mike Evans said he thought Ghey was not killed because she was transgender, but that being transgender made her "more vulnerable and accessible". Evans called the language used by Ratcliffe when talking about Ghey "dehumanising".

It was announced by the Judicial Office, on 7 March 2024, that Ratcliffe had applied for permission to appeal his sentence. Permission to appeal was refused at a hearing in December 2024.

The sentences of both Jenkinson and Ratcliffe were referred to the attorney general, Victoria Prentis, under the Unduly Lenient Sentences scheme. On 16 April, however, Prentis announced that the sentences would not be reviewed because the threshold to do so had not been met.

== Aftermath ==
On 8 March 2023, an inquest into Ghey's death was opened at Warrington Coroner's Court, and subsequently adjourned until after the trial. A pre-inquest hearing was scheduled for 17 August 2023. In June, the inquest into Ghey's death was put on hold, pending the outcome of the criminal proceedings.

Ghey's funeral was held at St Elphin's Church, Warrington, on 15 March 2023. Hundreds of mourners were joined by local dignitaries.

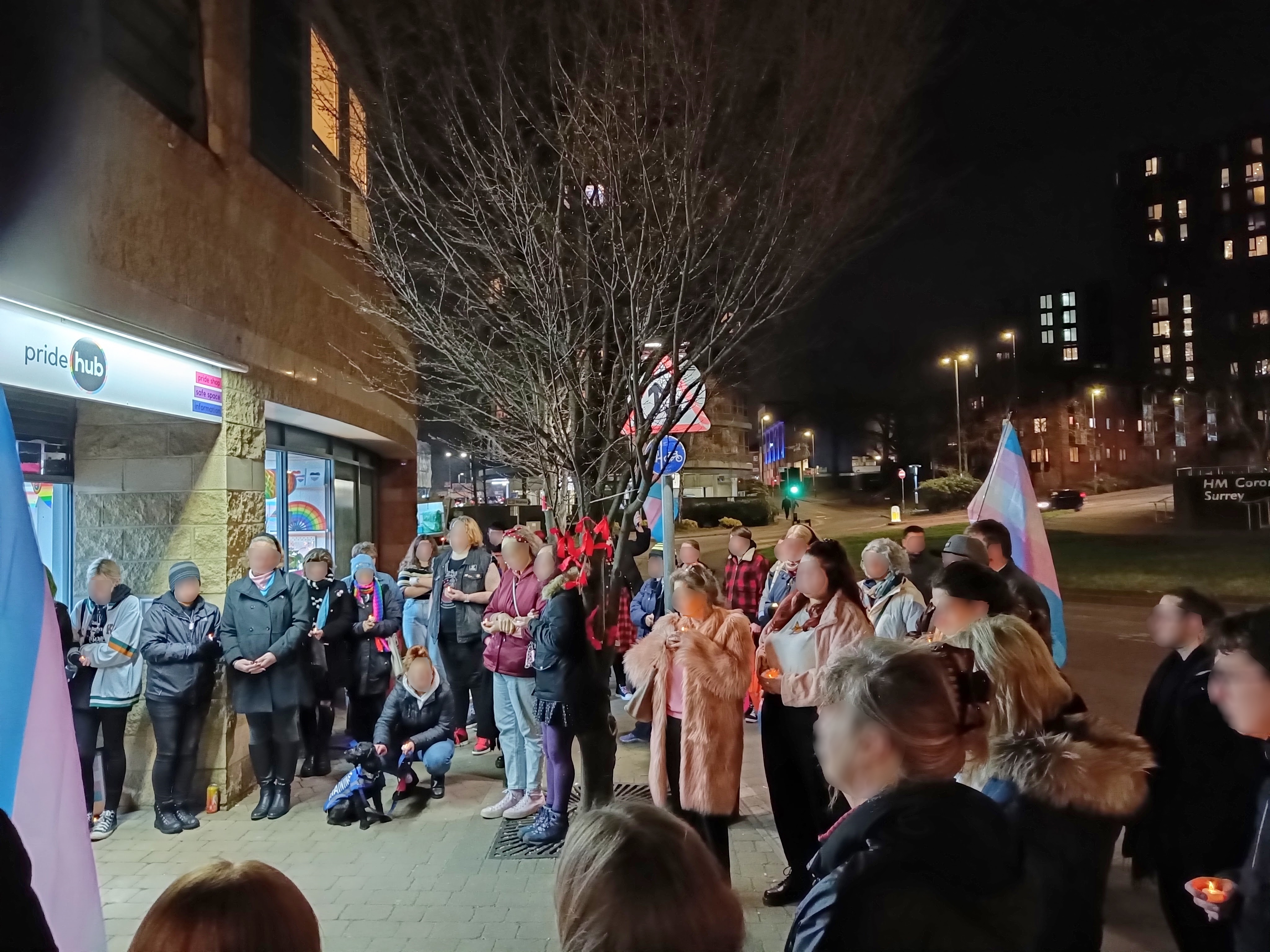
A candlelight vigil held for Ghey in Woking, Surrey, on 15 February 2023

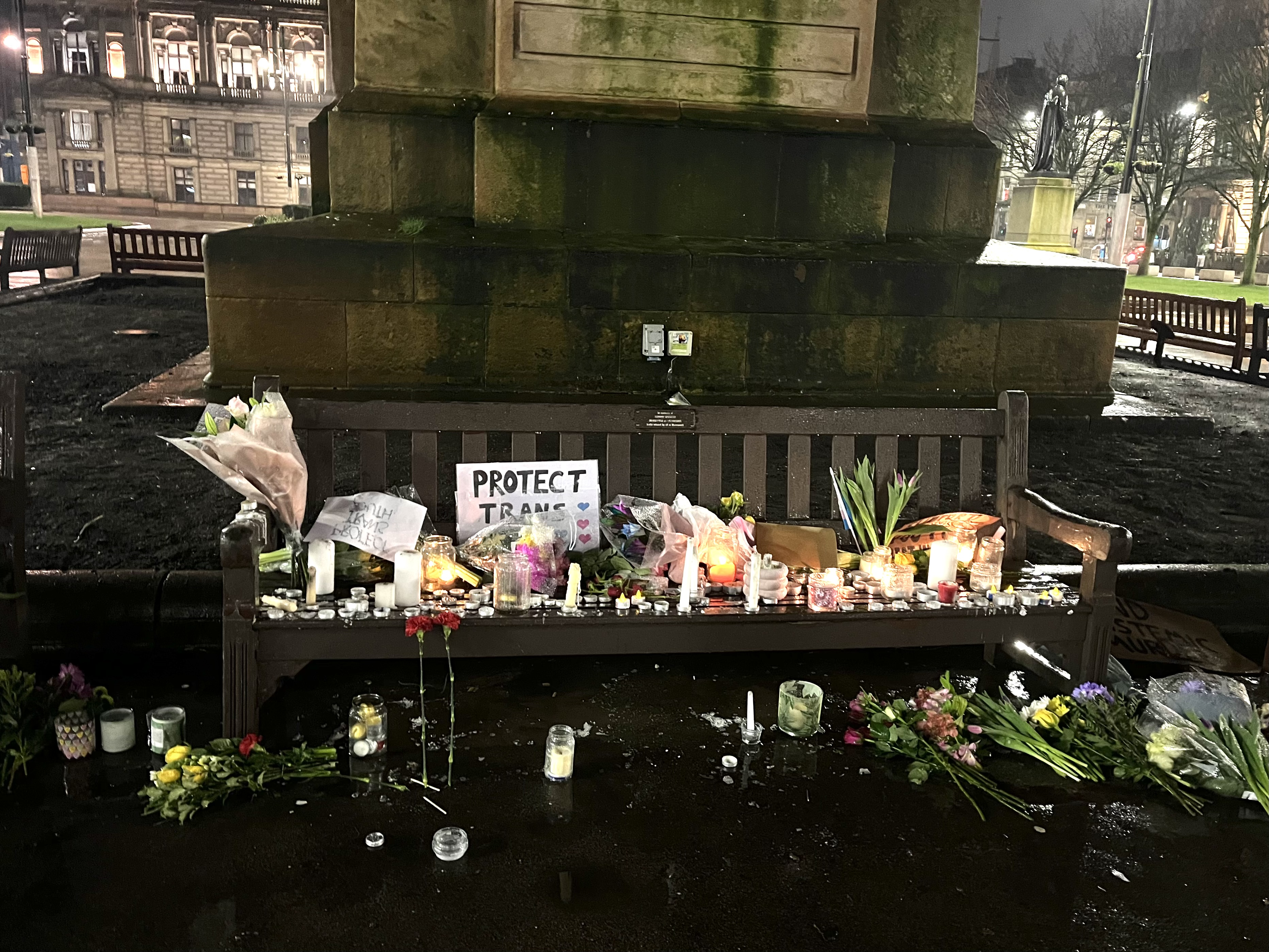
Flowers, candles, cards and signs in George Square, Glasgow, from the 16 February candlelight vigil for Ghey

A TikTok memorial account and a GoFundMe page were set up by Ghey's friends to support her family. It raised £70,000 in three days, and amassed over 36,000 followers on TikTok. After Ghey's fundraising page amassed £100,000, her family thanked people for their "overwhelming generosity" and stated that the money was spent on her funeral, refurbishing her room, and the purchase of cremation jewellery for the family's remembrance. Some of the donations were designated for a UK children's mental-health charity.

Candlelight vigils were held across the United Kingdom, and in Dublin, Ireland, in the week after Ghey's death. The attendance at many of these vigils numbered in the hundreds to thousands. A Cheshire Constabulary Investigating Officer said Ghey's family were overwhelmed by "the messages of support, positivity and the compassion across the country and beyond".

On 13 February, a no-fly zone was instituted over the site of the killing in response to flights by drones. Despite the no-fly zone, people continued to fly drones over the site, prompting condemnation from police.

An LGBTQ-themed radio station, Gaydio, announced that it had collaborated with other LGBTQ stations in the UK to broadcast a minute's silence at 11:00 a.m. on 17 February. The silence was preceded by a feature introduced by a transgender presenter, Stephanie Hirst, in which she reflected on the discrimination and violence often experienced by trans people, and paid tribute to Ghey.

== Reactions ==
Ghey's death prompted responses from her family, local community, politicians, charities, activists, and musicians. Ghey's family said her death had "left a massive hole in our family". Emma Mills, headteacher of Birchwood Community High School said: "We are shocked and truly devastated to hear of the death of Brianna." A parent of one of Ghey's friends, speaking with the Daily Mail, alleged that the killing was a hate crime.

Labour Party MP Dawn Butler said on Twitter that "Anyone in the media who is using her deadname trying to erase Brianna's identity should be ashamed of themselves." Another Labour Party MP Nadia Whittome said: "Brianna deserved a chance to become a beautiful adult woman, and to live to see a world where trans people are safe and respected." Former Labour Party leader Jeremy Corbyn responded by saying "she was killed because she wanted to be herself", and adding "My thoughts are with Brianna's family and the trans community fighting for safety, dignity and liberation".

The Miami Herald reported that thousands in the LGBTQ community and users of social media were grieving over the stabbing death of Ghey. LGBTQ rights charity Stonewall and transgender youth charity Mermaids expressed sympathy for Ghey's family. Transgender community helplines reported large increases in calls soon after Ghey's death, with topics concerning "transphobia, gender identity and hate crimes". Various musicians tweeted their sorrow, disgust and support, including Yungblud, Big Joanie and Reverend and the Makers.

In November 2026, Global human rights observers covering General Assembly resolutions of the United Nations on extrajudicial executions have cited Ghey’s murder alongside judicial findings of anti-trans hostility. Advocates use her case to urge member states to retain explicit protections for sexual orientation and gender identity in international human rights frameworks. Her murder was mentioned as among the prominent victims urging the UN to further protect rights of people from the LGBTQIA community.

=== Posthumous gender recognition ===
Twitter campaigns called for the UK government to issue a Gender Recognition Certificate to Ghey "so that she can have the dignity in death that everyone else in this world takes for granted". A petition circulated, reaching more than 13,000 signatures, for Ghey's death certificate to posthumously reflect her gender as female. The petition was rejected by the British government, who stated in response that the current policy "strikes the right balance" and that they had no plans to change it.

In April 2023, the Trans Safety Network reported that, contrary to popular belief, "in an ongoing case concerning a trans person's death, the coroner has agreed that a Gender Recognition Certificate is unnecessary in order to record the correct name and gender of a trans person on their death certificate."

In the third quarter of 2023, the death of Brianna Ghey was registered under her correct name and female gender at death.

=== Criticism of media ===
Some UK media outlets, including the Daily Express and The Times were criticised for their reporting of Ghey's death. The Trans Safety Network said that some UK media outlets were "publicly disrespecting" Ghey in their coverage of her death. Initial reporting by both BBC News and Sky News did not state that Ghey was transgender. The Times faced strong criticism after amending their original story by removing the word "girl" and including Ghey's deadname. The Times later amended their story again to remove the deadname and re-add the word "girl".

The website The Mary Sue condemned what it described as the transphobic atmosphere of the British press and widespread transphobic reporting on the killing of Ghey. An article by NBC News on the killing commented that "the climate in the U.K. has grown increasingly hostile for trans people over the last few years", adding that "trans activists" had also accused UK media of inflaming anti-transgender sentiments in recent years. Senthorun Raj, a professor of human rights law, said "We all have a responsibility to challenge the insidious ways the media and politicians dehumanise trans people." Ash Sarkar, a journalist for Novara Media, said she could not understand the "editorial decision to violate her dignity in death". Labour MP for Warrington North Charlotte Nichols said that she would be lodging a complaint with The Times and the Independent Press Standards Organisation and that "there is absolutely no need whatsoever for anyone to publish her deadname when identifying her as trans in media coverage".

=== Sunak and Starmer's PMQ exchange ===
At Prime Minister's Questions on 7 February 2024, answering an accusation of promise-breaking from Labour Party leader Keir Starmer, the prime minister, Rishi Sunak, itemised U-turns he said Starmer recently made, including on how to "define a woman". Starmer reacted by deriding Sunak for including that in his answer while Ghey's mother was "in this chamber". In response to Ghey's father's request for an apology, Sunak said it was Starmer's linking the comments to the murder that was "the worst of politics".

Esther Ghey, who was not in the public gallery to hear Sunak's remark, later declined requests for comment adding that she was concentrating on "creating a lasting legacy" for her daughter. Both Sunak and Starmer were criticised. Sunak's response was called a joke by some media outlets, and was criticised by some opposition MPs and Conservatives. Starmer's response was criticised by minister for women and equalities, Kemi Badenoch, who said it showed Labour were "happy to weaponise" Ghey's murder.

== Legacy ==
The murder was examined in the BBC Television documentary Big Cases: Killed in the Park and in the BBC Radio documentary A Plan to Kill – The Murder of Brianna Ghey, both first broadcast on 2 February 2024.

In September 2023 Esther Ghey launched a local campaign in Warrington, to deliver mindfulness training in schools in the area, raising £80,000 as part of "a lasting legacy" to her daughter. In 2024 she also backed a nationwide campaign, alongside Warrington North MP Charlotte Nichols, calling on government to fund mindfulness programmes in every school in England. On 7 February Esther Ghey was a guest at the House of Commons, to observe the debate on "Mindfulness in Schools". After the trial, she also called for smartphones to be banned for under-16s; by February 2024 a petition she launched had more than 90,000 signatures.

On the one-year anniversary of the murder, a vigil was held at the Golden Square Shopping Centre in Warrington. The gathering of more than a thousand was addressed by friends, family and local dignitaries, who spoke in remembrance of Ghey.

An anniversary tribute concert named Live Your Truth was held at The Brewers in Manchester's Gay Village on 18 February 2024. The event raised over £1,700 for the Peace in Mind UK campaign and the Mindfulness in Schools Project, which aims to place a mental health coach in every school in Warrington and eventually in all schools across England. By 18 February the Peace in Mind UK campaign had raised £80,000.

Esther Ghey met Jenkinson's mother in March 2024. Ghey commended the other mother's bravery and said, "Both of us are mothers trying to navigate something that nobody should ever have gone through."

In 2025 both a book and a television documentary were released about this topic. The memoir Under a Pink Sky by Brianna's mother Esther Ghey, was published by Michael Joseph and the film Brianna: A Mother's Story, by Iwan Roberts, was broadcast by ITV Television.

The case was the subject of Episode 6 of the documentary series TikTok: Murder Gone Viral released on 21 October 2025.

=== Inquest ===
In October 2024, a three-day inquest was held into the state of affairs leading up the killing. Particular attention was paid to Brianna's mobile phone usage, in which the inquest heard that Brianna had not allowed her mother to access her phone, and social workers did not have the authority to remove it from her.

Additional concern was paid to her school environment, in which Brianna had previously been disciplined for her mobile phone usage, and for rolling up her skirt to make it appear shorter – rules which Brianna had characterised as "ridiculous".

The inquest also looked at Jenkinson's transfer to Birchwood, concluding that it had been conducted appropriately, and that the outcome would not have changed had the matter been approached differently.

== See also ==
- History of violence against LGBTQ people in the United Kingdom
- List of people killed for being transgender
- Violence against trans women
- Violence against transgender people
