= Birchwood, Cheshire =

Town in Cheshire, England

Coordinates: 53.418°N 2.529°W

Birchwood
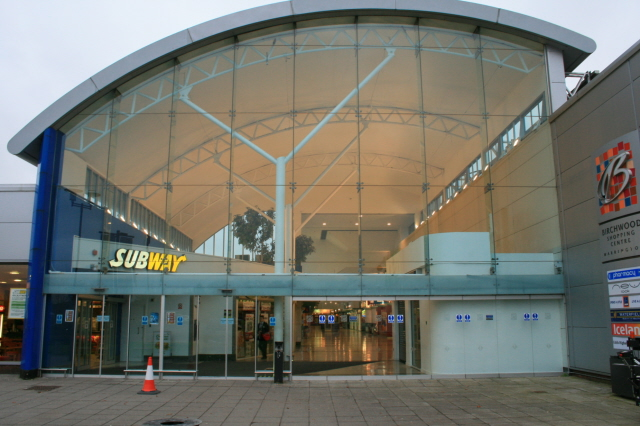
- Birchwood Shopping Centre

- Location within Cheshire
- Population: 10,614 (2021)
- OS grid reference: SJ649914
- Civil parish: Birchwood
- Unitary authority: Warrington
- Ceremonial county: Cheshire
- Region: North West
- Country: England
- Sovereign state: United Kingdom
- Post town: WARRINGTON
- Postcode district: WA3
- Dialling code: 01925
- Police: Cheshire
- Fire: Cheshire
- Ambulance: North West
- UK Parliament: Warrington North
- Website: Town Council

Birchwood is a town and civil parish in the Borough of Warrington, Cheshire, England. The parish had a population of 10,614 at the 2021 census. Located originally in Lancashire, it was built as a new town in the 1970s. Birchwood is made up of three districts: Gorse Covert, Locking Stumps and Oakwood.

== History ==
"The surface, at a distance, looks black and dirty, and will bear neither horse nor man….. What nature meant by such a useless production 'tis hard to imagine, but the land is entirely to waste" are the words of Daniel Defoe as he rode through Risley in 1724. (Later part of the Risley area was renamed Birchwood as the Warrington 'New town' development).

In the past, travellers avoided the Risley (Birchwood) area because it of its dangerous mossland, however gradually over time much of the fertile mossland was reclaimed and turned into farmland. With the advent of the Second World War, 927 acres (3.8 km^{2}) of agricultural land was changed into a large Royal Ordnance Factory, ROF Risley. The location was chosen because the low lying mist and cloud helped camouflage the factory from the air; according to a local builder: "It was very lonely and misty at night, and that's why the factory was constructed there ... it was usually covered with a mist or cloud. It was hard to see it in the day time, you know". Although the location of the factory was known by the German Luftwaffe, the factory was bombed only once during the war.

A number of bunkers were built (some can still be seen today) to house the munitions, to protect them from potential bombing, and also to segregate the site and reduce the consequences of any accidental explosions during manufacture or storage. Although these bunkers are on the surface, they are covered with soil and turf and so give the impression of being underground.

After the war, the factory no longer had a purpose other than as a storage depot, so in 1956 the north-west of the site was sold to the Atomic Energy Authority. The whole of Warrington borough was designated as a proposed new town in 1968, and subsequently the Warrington and Runcorn Development Corporation bought the site and turned it into the new town of Birchwood.

== Transport ==
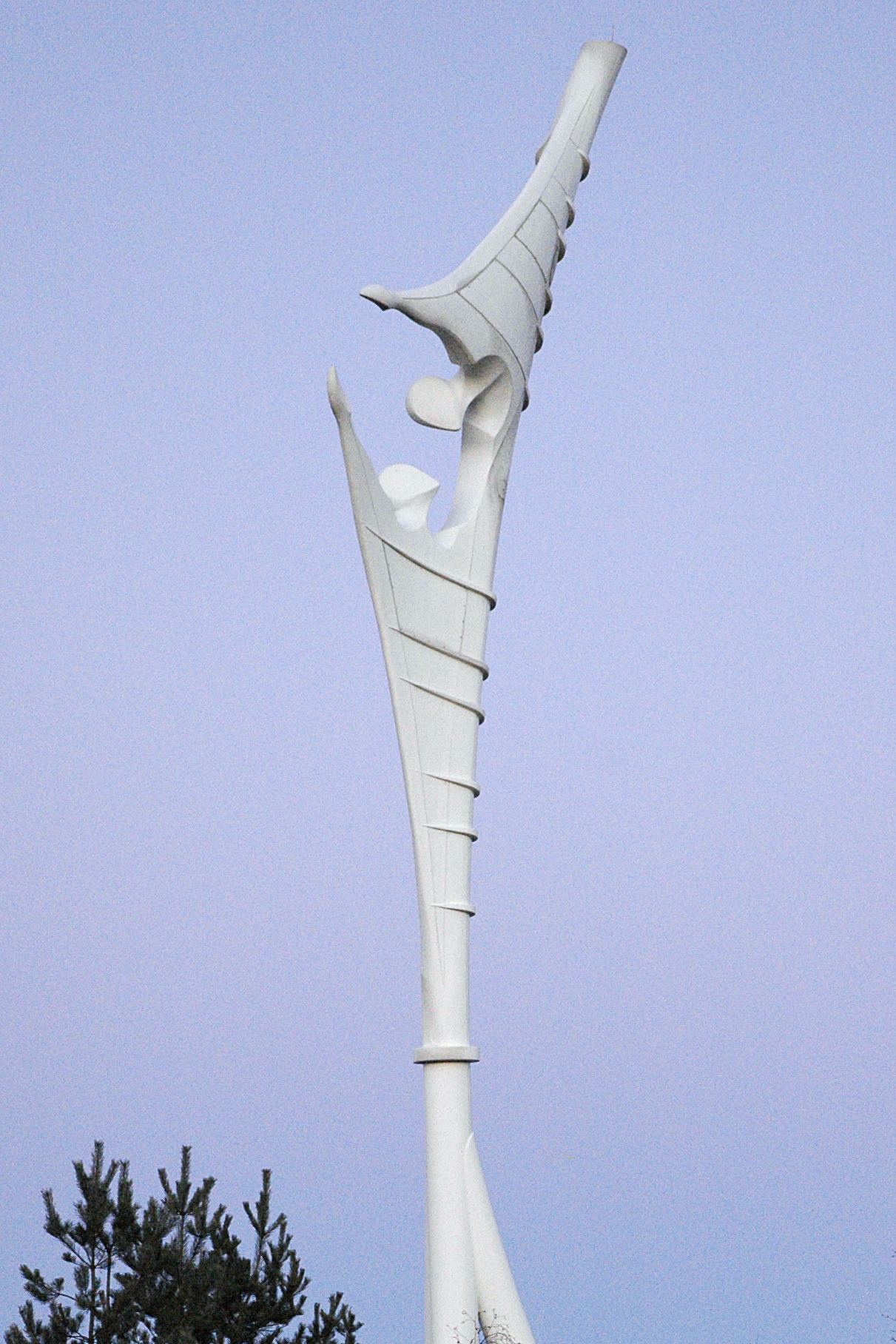
Encounter – the gateway to Birchwood, Warrington, England (2005)

Birchwood is close to the intersections between the M6 and M62 and the M6 and M56, and the railway station on the Liverpool–Manchester line.

=== Rail ===
Birchwood railway station is operated by Northern with trains stopping bound for Manchester, Liverpool and Warrington Central as well as long-distance services to Norwich which are operated by East Midlands Railway during peak hours only. Trains pass through three times an hour per direction:

- Two suburban trains per hour to Manchester Oxford Road via Irlam
- Two suburban trains per hour to Liverpool Lime Street via Warrington Central
- One fast train per hour to Liverpool Lime Street stopping only at Warrington Central and Liverpool South Parkway en route
- One fast train per hour to Manchester Airport via Manchester Piccadilly

=== Road ===
Birchwood is very close to Junction 11 of the M62, providing access to Liverpool (22 miles/35 km) and Manchester (15 miles/24 km). Junction 11 is notable for the Encounter statue (also known as the Angel of Birchwood). Birchwood is close to Junction 21 of the M6, giving access to Birmingham (80 miles/128 km). Birchwood is approximately 5 miles (8.0 km) from Warrington town centre (via Birchwood Way) and Leigh (11 miles/18 km) (via Warrington Road).

=== Buses ===
Bus routes in the Birchwood area operated by Warrington's Own Buses. Destinations include Warrington, Culcheth, and Leigh. A shuttle bus service for workers runs between the railway station and Birchwood Park business park.

== Geography ==
The area east of Birchwood is mainly birch forests and Risley Moss, part of the Mersey Forest. Risley Moss is a Site of Special Scientific Interest. The bulk of Birchwood is built on the site of the former ROF Risley Royal Ordnance Factory, with Birchwood Forest Park lying in the centre, in which the old bunkers from the factory form part of the landscape.

== Education ==
Birchwood has three primary schools, one per area (Birchwood Church of England Primary and Nursery, Locking Stumps Primary, Gorse Covert Primary) and Birchwood Community High School. Birchwood College is next to the high school.

== Media ==
Local news and television programmes are provided by BBC North West and ITV Granada. Television signals are received from the Winter Hill TV transmitter. The town is served by Cheshire's MIX56 radio station broadcasting from Lymm as well as both BBC Radio Merseyside and BBC Radio Manchester. Other radio stations are Heart North West, Smooth North West, Capital North West & Wales, Greatest Hits Radio Liverpool & The North West (formerly Wire FM) and Warrington Radio, a community based station which broadcast from nearby Warrington. The town is served by the local newspaper, Warrington Guardian.

== Industry ==
To the north of the Royal Ordnance Factory, Risley was the site chosen for the design offices and headquarters of the Department of ATomic ENergy (DATEN) after the Second World War. Later to become the United Kingdom Atomic Energy Authority (UKAEA), the offices were charged with the manufacture of the nuclear reactors and process plants at Windscale to help build the UK's atomic defence. Following on from the weapons program, the Risley offices were responsible for the building of the Magnox and AGR designs of reactor in the UK. In 1971 BNFL was set up from the production division of the UKAEA, and until 2003 its headquarters were at Risley. BNFL's headquarters are now at Daresbury Park industrial estate, also near to Warrington.

BNFL (now represented by Sellafield Ltd and Nexia Solutions) maintains a large office of the site, which is something of a nuclear nexus, with AMEC (Formerly NNC), Nuvia (formerly NUKEM Engineering Limited), WS Atkins Design, Environment & Engineering, Nuclear Technologies plc, Serco and Assurance Quintessa (among others) based on Birchwood Park.

WS Atkins has one office in Birchwood, at Chadwick House, containing various business units including Water, Highways and Transportation, Design Solutions, Rail, Nuclear and Faithful+Gould.

== Governance ==
The first tier of local government is Birchwood Town Council. Birchwood ward elects three members of Warrington Borough Council. For national elections, the parish is part of the Warrington North constituency.

== Demography ==
Data is based on that of Birchwood Ward.

=== Population and ethnicity ===
Birchwood has a total population of 11,220 residents, of which 50.3% are male and 49.7% are female. The average age of the population at the census was 37.2 years. The majority of the population describe their race as White (97.05%), while minorities are mixed (0.9%), Black (0.4%) and Asian (0.9%). Other racial origins account for 0.8% of the population.

=== Housing and social situation ===
At the census, the Birchwood ward of Warrington had 4,919 houses. 65.6% are classed as owner occupied, 28.3% are council accommodation, 4.8% are rented from other sources and 1.3% of houses have residents living rent free. The average house price for all houses in Birchwood was £118,635. 7% of all households in the ward are overcrowded. The population density in the ward is 13.9 residents per hectare. In terms of the ACORN index, 35.7% (the majority) describe Warrington as a comfortably well-off area, on the other hand in terms of economic indices, Birchwood is a slightly below-average area. 5.4% of residents at the last survey were on some form of benefits.

=== Employment and education ===
At 2005, Birchwood had 65.6% employment, with only 3.4% of all economically active people unemployed. 2.8% of the population are students in full-time higher education. 28.2% of the total population are economically inactive (due to retirement, ill health, or full-time carer status). According to ward statistics, of the population (in Birchwood ward). 24.2% are unqualified (either due to leaving school early or failing the end of school examinations). 48.4% have level 1 or 2 qualifications (level 1 being 1+ GCSE (A*-G) or "O" Level or equivalent, level 2 being 5+ GCSEs (grades A*-C), 1+'A' levels/ AS levels (A-E) or equivalent). 20.8% have received level 3+ qualifications (meaning 2+ A-levels (A-E), 4+ AS-levels (A-E) or equivalent minimum).

== Districts ==
Pestfurlong Hill, part of the parkland near Gorse Covert (2005)

=== Gorse Covert ===
Gorse Covert is the easternmost of the districts which form the town of Birchwood in Warrington. It is also the most easterly part of the Warrington urban area (though not of Warrington borough). It was formerly site 6 of the Royal Ordnance Factory at Risley. It is now a large, lively, suburban residential area with a mixture of good quality housing. It has a pub (The Poacher), and Indian Restaurant/Take Away (Birchwood Spice), a primary school (Gorse Covert Primary School), a pre-school (Village Pre-School) and a local shop (One Stop). Gorse Covert also has woodland areas and walks with views from Pestfurlong Hill.

At the 2001 census (the next one scheduled for 2011), there were 2791 residents living in 1191 properties (statistic areas 005B and 004B – Gorse Covert, Risley South and Locking Stumps East). Of these properties 81% are owner occupied, with the remainder being rented, either from the council, local housing authority or private landlords. Gorse Covert residents are approximately 23% more likely to be in paid employment than the average for England and Wales, with an unemployment rate of around 1.9% (around 53 residents) of all economically active people aged 16–74. 16% of economically active residents (i.e. 16- to 74-year-olds) do not have any form of qualification (around 446 residents).

=== Locking Stumps ===
Locking Stumps is the furthest west of the three districts in Birchwood. It has a population of 2,759 residents in 1,102 households. It is a relatively large district with a shop, public house (The Turf and Feather), takeaway shop, primary school (Locking Stumps Community Primary School), and a modern church (Thomas Risley United Reformed Church). This was enlarged in 2001 due to the growth of its congregation.

At the 2001 census, Office for National Statistics areas 004C and 004D the housing breaks down into: 873 owner occupied houses; 35 council owned houses; 189 rented (non-council) houses; and 5 which have undisclosed status.

=== Oakwood ===
Oakwood is a district of Birchwood, which is very close to the Birchwood centre. According to the 2001 census, there are 2003 properties, with a total of 4381 residents (this covers the ONS areas of 005A (Oakwood West, near Birchwood), 005C (Oakwood East, near Risely Moss) and 005D (Oakwood Central)). Oakwood has various basic amenities including a convenience store complete with post office, a pub (Nelsons Quarterdeck), a takeaway shop, the Church of Transfiguration, a primary school (Birchwood CofE Primary and Nursery School) and a high school (Birchwood Community High School) which is now a Business and Enterprise College, and is a beacon high school.

At the 2001 census, of 2003 possible houses in Oakwood: 46% are owner occupied; 8% are council owned; 43% are rented (non council) properties; and 3% did not disclose their status.

=== Birchwood Park business park ===
Birchwood Park is a 123-acre (0.50 km^{2}) mixed use business park and is located in the North West of England close to Warrington between Manchester and Liverpool. The M6 and M62 interchange is only minutes away and provides links to the surrounding region and beyond.

The site is owned by MEPC. 4,200 people are employed on the park, and a free bus service runs twice each morning from Warrington Bank Quay Station.

== Notable people ==
- Brianna Ghey, (2006–2023), murder victim
- George Sampson, (born 1993), dancer and winner of Britain's Got Talent in 2008

== See also ==
- Listed buildings in Birchwood
