= Birchwood Forest Park =

Park in England

Coordinates: 53.423°N 2.521°W

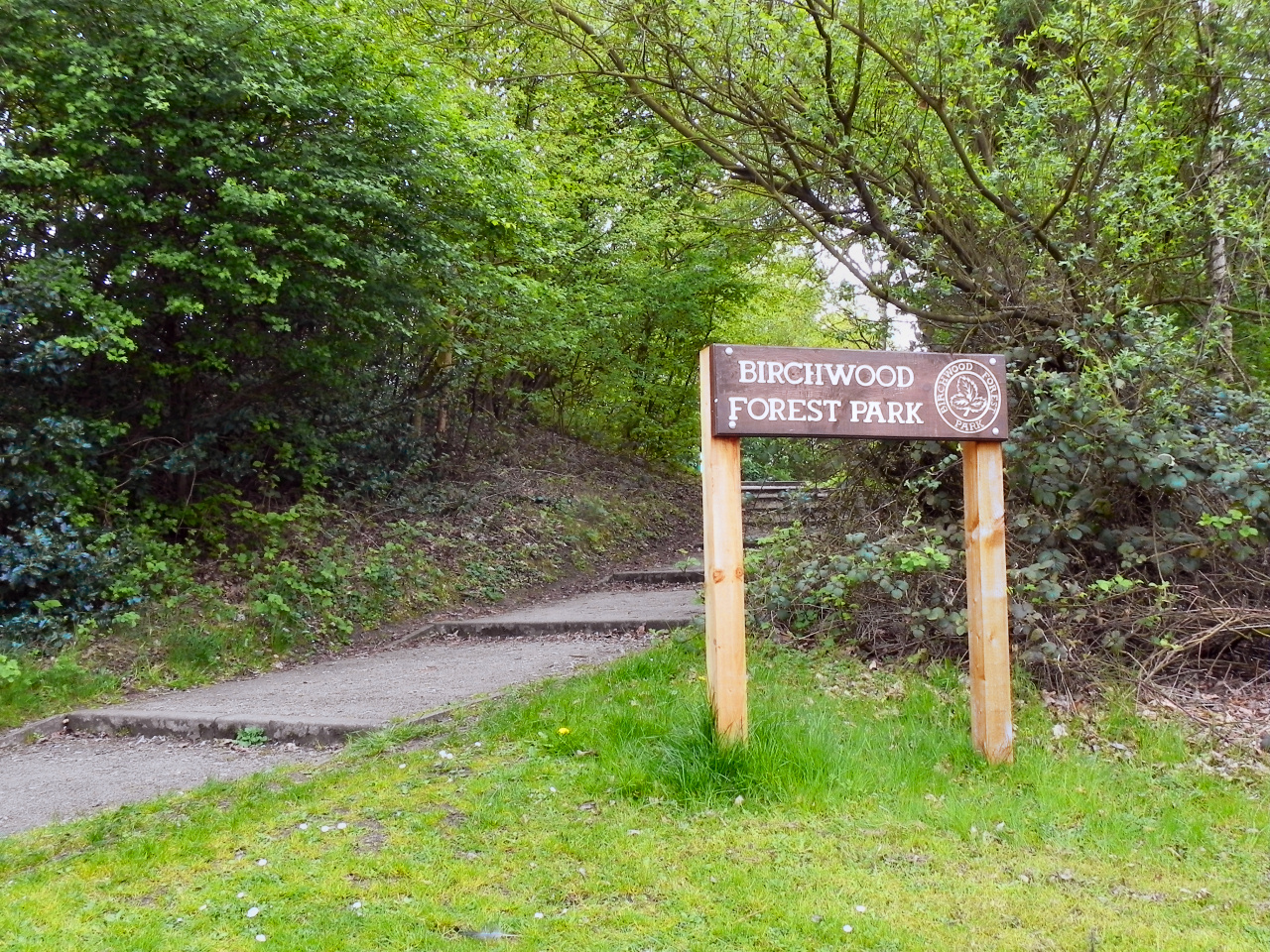
Birchwood Forest Park - Moss Gate Entrance

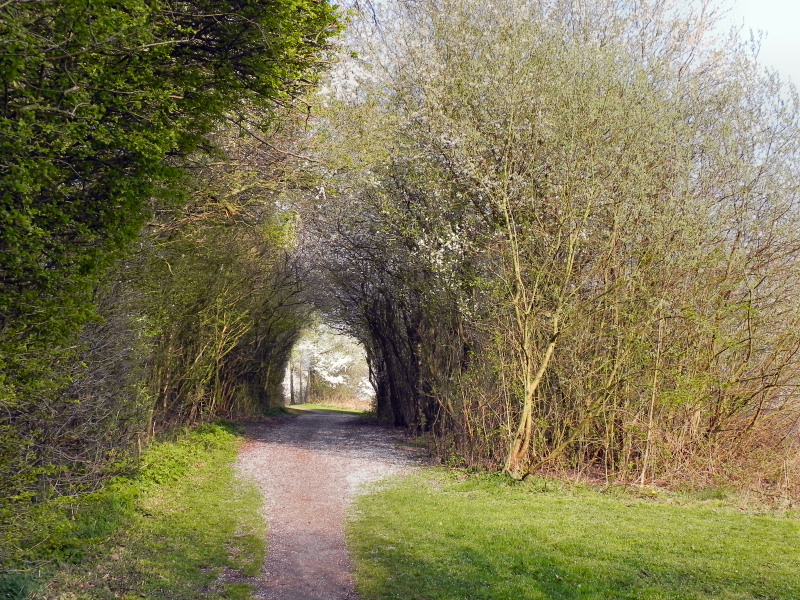
Birchwood Forest Parkn

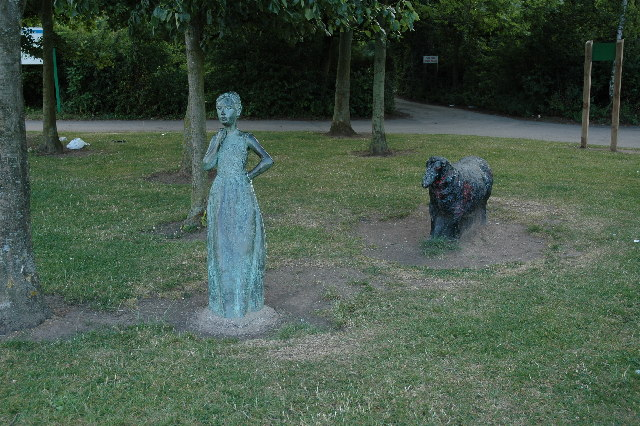
Bronze Statues, Birchwood Forest Park

Birchwood Forest Park covers the area formerly occupied by the Royal Ordnance Factory, ROF Risley, in Birchwood, Warrington, in north-west England. The park covers an area of 500 acres (2.0 km^{2}) and stretches from the M6 in the west to the M62, junction 11, in the east.

In 1985, a sculpture entitled Bo Peep and Her Sheep, sculpted by Diane Gorvin was introduced to the park.
