= History of violence against LGBTQ people in the United Kingdom =

The history of violence against LGBT people in the United Kingdom is made up of assaults on gay men, lesbians, bisexual, transgender, queer and intersex individuals (LGBTQI), and those perceived to be such, and legal responses to such violence, since the country’s formation in 1707.

== Prior to 1900 ==
On the creation of the United Kingdom in 1707, continuing English law included the Buggery Act 1533, which made male homosexual acts punishable by death, while continuing Scottish law outlawed sodomy, also punishable by death.

English law defined buggery as an unnatural sexual act against the will of God and man, later defined by the courts to include only anal penetration and bestiality. (Note: R v Jacobs (1817) Russ & Ry 331 confirmed that buggery related only to intercourse per anum by a man with a man or woman, or intercourse per anum or per vaginam by either a man or a woman with an animal. Other forms of "unnatural intercourse" may amount to indecent assault or gross indecency, but do not constitute buggery (see generally: Smith & Hogan, Criminal Law (10th ed.) ISBN 0-406-94801-1))The Act was repealed by section 1 of the Offences Against the Person Act 1828 (9 Geo. 4. c. 31) and by section 125 of the Criminal Law (India) Act 1828 (c. 74). It was replaced by section 15 of the Offences Against the Person Act 1828, and section 63 of the Criminal Law (India) Act 1828, which provided that buggery would continue to be a capital offence. In the period from 1810 to 1835, 46 people convicted of sodomy were hanged and 32 sentenced to death but reprieved. A further 716 were imprisoned or sentenced to the pillory, before its use was restricted in 1816. The last executions were the hangings of James Pratt and John Smith, on 27 November 1835. Buggery remained a capital offence in England and Wales until the enactment of the Offences against the Person Act 1861; however, male homosexual acts still remained illegal and were punishable by imprisonment and in 1885 section 11 of the Criminal Law Amendment Act 1885 extended the laws regarding homosexuality to include any kind of sexual activity between males. Lesbians were never acknowledged or targeted by legislation.

Sodomy remained a capital offence in Scotland until 1887 when Section 56 of the Criminal Procedure (Scotland) Act reduced the number of capital crimes to murder, attempted murder, and treason.

== 1900–1967 ==
Into the 1900s, homosexual activity remained illegal and punishable by imprisonment. In the early-1950s, the police actively enforced laws prohibiting sexual behaviour between men leading to a number of high-profile arrests and trials. One of those involved the noted computer scientist, mathematician, and war-time code-breaker Alan Turing (1912–1954), convicted in 1952 of "gross indecency". Turing was given a choice between imprisonment or probation conditional on his agreement to undergo hormonal treatment designed to reduce his libido. He accepted chemical castration via oestrogen hormone injections.

Much lesser-known individuals were also victims of the law and of violent crime perpetrated by their fellow countrymen. On 31 July 1950, in Rotherham, an English schoolteacher, Kenneth Crowe, aged 37, was found dead wearing his wife's clothes and a wig. He had approached a miner on his way home from the pub, who upon discovering Crowe was male, beat and strangled him. John Cooney was found not guilty of murder and sentenced to five years for manslaughter.

In response to the violence and unfair treatment of gay men, the Sexual Offences Act 1967 was passed. It maintained the general prohibitions on buggery and indecency between men, but provided for a limited decriminalisation of homosexual acts in England and Wales where three conditions were fulfilled: that the act was consensual, took place in private and involved only people who had attained the age of 21. This was a higher age of consent than that for heterosexual acts, which was set at 16. Further, "in private" limited participation in an act to two people. This condition was interpreted strictly by the courts, which took it to exclude acts taking place in a room in a hotel, for example, and in private homes where a third person was present (even if that person was in a different room).

The Sexual Offences Act 1967 extended only to England and Wales, and not to Scotland or Northern Ireland. (The Channel Islands and the Isle of Man, where all homosexual behaviour remained illegal, are Crown Dependencies and not part of the UK.)

== 1978-1983: Muswell Hill murderer ==
Between 1978 and 1983, Dennis Nilson, himself gay, murdered at least 12 men, the majority of whom were homeless or gay.

== 1989–1990: West London murders ==
Towards the end of 1989 and the start of 1990, there were a series of unsolved murders in west London over a period of six months.

In September 1989, Christopher Schliach, a barrister who was gay, was murdered in his home; he was stabbed more than 40 times. Three months later, Henry Bright, a hotelier who was gay, was also stabbed to death at his home. A month later, William Dalziel, a hotel porter who was gay, was found unconscious on a roadside in Acton, west London. He died from severe head injuries. Three months after this, actor Michael Boothe was murdered in west London (see below 2007 Met review).

In July 1990, following these murders, hundreds of lesbians and gay men marched from the park where Boothe had been killed to Ealing Town Hall and held a candlelit vigil. The demonstration led to the formation of OutRage, who called for the police to start protecting gay men instead of arresting them. In September 1990, lesbian and gay police officers established the Lesbian and Gay Police Association (Lagpa/GPA).

== 1999: The Admiral Duncan pub bombing ==
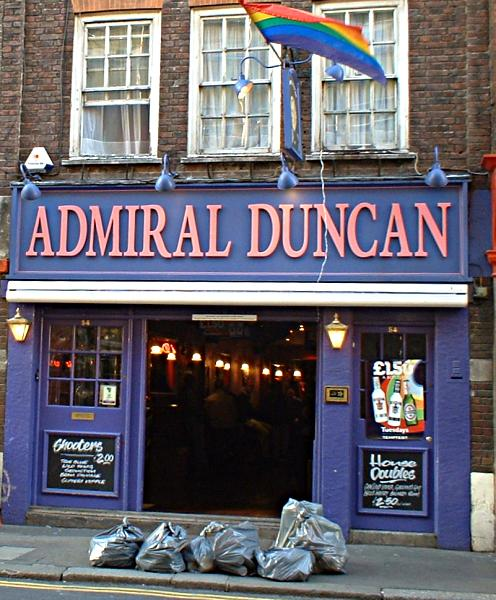
London gay pub bombing in 1999 killed three and injured 70

In May 1999, the Admiral Duncan, a gay pub in Soho was bombed by former British National Party member David Copeland, killing three people and wounding at least 70.

== 2002: CPS 'zero tolerance' ==
On 27 November 2002, the Crown Prosecution Service announced a 'zero tolerance' approach towards perpetrators of anti-gay offences; this also covers crimes against transgender people. Crimes considered 'homophobic' or 'transphobic' are to be assessed in a similar way to those considered racist (e.g. the victim regarding them as such). "There is no statutory definition of a homophobic or transphobic incident. However, when prosecuting such cases, and to help us to apply our policy on dealing with cases with a homophobic or transphobic element, we adopt the following definition: 'Any incident which is perceived to be homophobic or transphobic by the victim or by any other person.'"

== 2003: Criminal Justice Act ==
The Criminal Justice Act 2003 is passed, in which section 146 empowers courts in England and Wales to impose tougher sentences for offences motivated or aggravated by the victim's sexual orientation.

== 2006: first prosecution for homophobic murder ==
On 14 October 2005, London, Jody Dobrowski was beaten to death on Clapham Common by two men who perceived him as being gay; Dobrowski was beaten so badly he had to be identified by his fingerprints. Thomas Pickford and Scott Walker were given life sentences in what was described as a 'homophobic murder' in June 2006. This was the first prosecution in England and Wales where Section 146 of the Criminal Justice Act 2003 was used in sentencing the killers; this enabled the courts to impose a tougher sentence for offences motivated or aggravated by the victim's sexual orientation, in this case a minimum of 30 years in prison.

In 2007, UK's Channel 4 released Clapham Junction, a TV drama partially based on the murder. The film written by Kevin Elyot and directed by Adrian Shergold portrays to some detail the victim Jody Dobrowski. In the script to the film however, the Clapham Common's victim's name was changed to Alfie Cartwright, a waiter. The role was played by actor David Leon. The film was shown for the first time on 22 July 2007, on Channel 4, almost two years after the murder, to mark the 40th anniversary of decriminalisation of homosexuality in England and Wales, and was meant to be a film against violence against gay people and hate crimes based on sexual orientation. It was shown a second time on More4, just a few days later, on 30 July 2007.

== 2007: Metropolitan Police review ==
In July 2004 an independent inquiry into police procedures carried out by the independent Lesbian Gay Bisexual Transgender Advisory Group for the Metropolitan Police was announced. In May 2007 the report for the independent review was released; it had examined how detectives had handled 10 murders of gay men or transsexuals. The report found that some police inquiries were hampered by lack of knowledge, reliance on unfounded stereotypes and personal prejudices; these problems were mirrored and exacerbated by media coverage. The review recognised that Scotland Yard's work with the gay, lesbian and transsexual communities and its investigative processes had improved significantly since the 1990s, but warned that more radical steps were needed. The cases reviewed, and the findings, included:

- Actor Michael Boothe, in west London died in April 1990, beaten to death by a gang of up to six men close to a public lavatory. The police said he had been the victim of "an extraordinarily severe beating, of a merciless and savage nature". He managed to give a description of his attackers before he died, and a reward of £15,000 was offered, but no one was caught, and the crime remains unsolved. The police review identified institutional homophobia within the Metropolitan Police as a factor.
- Colin Ireland, age 43, who in 1993 was jailed for life for murdering five gay men. Ireland picked up the men at pubs in London, and then killed them in their own homes. A Scotland Yard review showed that Ireland's capture was hampered by institutional homophobia within the Metropolitan Police.
  - Andrew Collier, a housing warden, aged 33, was one of Ireland's victims; the murder was classified as homophobic and linked with the death of Peter Walker, Ireland's first victim. The report said the police could have done more to warn the community of the links between the murders.
  - Emanuel Spiteri, age 41, who was strangled to death in his flat in Catford by Ireland, after meeting in a pub in Earls Court, west London.
- Robyn Brown, a 23-year-old transsexual prostitute, was found stabbed to death in her flat in London on 28 February 1997. The original report described her as being 23-year-old Gemma Browne, formerly James Darwin Browne. The case went cold for over ten years, but her killer, James Hopkins, was eventually caught; in January 2009 he was jailed for life. The report found that identifying her to the public using different names may have hampered attempts to connect with relevant communities.
- Jaap Bornkamp, a 52-year-old florist, was knifed in June 2000 in south-east London in a homophobic attack; the murder remains unsolved despite the police displaying 20 ft by 10 ft images of CCTV footage taken near the murder scene. He was attacked after leaving a night club, and the police are reported as saying there was no confrontation or argument, but that the attack was homophobic and unprovoked. The report found this case to have been a model of police good practice.
- Geoffrey Windsor, 57, in south London died in June 2002 from head injuries in a park after he was beaten and robbed. The police said the murder was motivated by homophobia. A review of this and similar cases in the area highlighted poor policing due to institutional homophobia within the police, particularly in not taking previous attacks in the area more seriously.

== 2000–2009 ==
Damilola Taylor was attacked by a local gang of youths on 27 November 2000 in Peckham, south London; he bled to death after being stabbed with a broken bottle in the thigh, which severed the femoral artery. BBC News, Daily Telegraph, Guardian and Independent newspapers reported at the time that during the weeks between arriving in the UK from Nigeria and the attack he had been subjected to bullying and beating, which included homophobic remarks by a group of boys at his school. "The bullies told him that he was gay." He "may not have understood why he was being bullied at school, or why some other children taunted him about being 'gay' – the word meant nothing to him." He had to ask his mother what 'gay' meant, she said "Boys were swearing at him, saying lots of horrible words. They were calling him names." His mother had spoken about this bullying, but the teachers failed to take it seriously. "She said pupils had accused her son of being gay and had beaten him last Friday." Six months after the murder, his father said, "I spoke to him and he was crying that he was being bullied and being called names. He was being called 'gay'." In the New Statesman two years later, when there had still been no convictions for the crime, Peter Tatchell, gay human rights campaigner, said, "In the days leading up to his murder in south London in November 2000, he was subjected to vicious homophobic abuse and assaults," and asked why the authorities had ignored this before and after his death.

In July 2005, Lauren Harries, a trans woman, was attacked along with her father and brother in their home in Cardiff by eight youths who shouted the word "tranny" while beating their victims. One youth pleaded guilty to inflicting grievous bodily harm and was sentenced to two years probation; his accomplices were not formally identified or charged.

In April 2006 a man was jailed for a homophobic attack on an openly gay priest. Barry Rathbone was sitting in a park in Bournemouth, Dorset when Martin Powell and his girlfriend approached and spoke to him. Rathbone informed them that it was a cruising area, then Powell produced a 3-foot-long (0.91 m) metal baseball bat, called him a 'queer', and started to hit him.

On 25 July 2008, 18-year-old Michael Causer was attacked by a group of men at a party in Liverpool, and died from his injuries. It is alleged that he was killed because he was gay. On 23 October 2008, 23-year-old gay hairdresser Daniel Jenkinson was the victim of a homophobic attack in a Preston club. His attacker, Neil Bibby, also from Preston, was sentenced to 200 hours' unpaid work, a three-month weekend curfew, and ordered to pay £2,000 compensation after he pleaded guilty to assault. Daniel needed facial reconstruction surgery after the attack, and said he was too scared to go out in the city.

On 3 March 2009 in Bromley, south London, 59-year-old Gerry Edwards was stabbed to death by an assailant shouting homophobic abuse. His partner of over twenty years, 56-year-old Chris Bevan, was also stabbed and admitted to hospital in a critical condition. The police dealing with the case said they had an open mind, but were treating it as a homophobic murder. David Kilcullen, 46, from Bromley, was subsequently convicted of murder and sentenced to life with a minimum of 32 years.

On 15 May 2009, An English court found two football fans guilty of shouting homophobic chants at footballer Sol Campbell during a match This was the first prosecution for indecent chanting in the UK. The police reported that up to 2,500 fans shouted chants at the match that included "Sol, Sol, wherever you may be, Not long now until lunacy, We won't give a fuck if you are hanging from a tree," the footballer commented "I felt totally victimised and helpless by the abuse I received on this day. It has had an effect on me personally". Three men and two boys were given cautions after the match.

In September 2009, 62-year-old Ian Baynham was attacked outside South Africa House in Trafalgar Square in London by three youths shouting homophobic abuse. Joel Alexander and Ruby Thomas were found guilty of manslaughter at the Old Bailey and sentenced to six and seven years imprisonment respectively. A third accomplice, Rachael Burke was found guilty of a lesser charge of affray and sentenced to two years of imprisonment.

== 2010s ==
In 2012, Giovanna Del Nord, a 46-year-old trans woman, was attacked minutes after entering The Market Tavern, a pub in Leicester city centre. Without warning she was punched in the head and knocked unconscious.

In June 2012, Steven Simpson, an autistic, openly gay 18-year-old, had homophobic slurs written on his body and was set on fire at his birthday party by Jordan Sheard, 20, who was sentenced to 3 1/2 years in jail in March 2013. A vigil was held for Simpson in Sheffield on 9 April 2013, and gay rights organisation Stonewall successfully wrote to the Attorney General asking for a review of the case. Jordan Sheard, 20, of Darfield Road, Cudworth, received a three-and-a-half-year sentence at Sheffield Crown Court.

In 2015, Frank McGowan, a Scottish gay filmmaker known for the film Looking After Mum, was sexually assaulted by a woman at party in Glasgow. The perpetrator, named Cheryl Cottrell, was convicted of sexual assault and put on the sex offender regristry and sentenced to 120 hours (approximately five days) of community service. Because of this event, McGowan became suicidal and is struggling with post-traumatic stress disorder.

In 2017, a 36-year-old man was attacked by 29-year-old Kamil Wladyslaw Snios in Tottenham, London. The attacker later made a number of homophobic remarks during police interview and cited homosexuality as a reason for attack. The victim was treated for four fractures to his right leg. Kamil Snios has been sentenced to 10 years in prison.

In 2018, homophobic and transphobic hate crime was at record levels in Merseyside. Hate crimes increased dramatically since Michael Causer's death in 2008. Of the figures retrieved by the BBC, more than half of the 442 reported victims in 2017 were under 35 years of age, and more than 50 of the crimes were against people under 18 years of age. A number of factors may have contributed to the rise, including improved reporting by LGBT people. However, the number of offenders being brought to justice did not increase commensurately with the number of hate crimes recorded. It was reported that only one in five homophobic hate crimes are now solved. "Merseyside police told BBC Three there has been a 38% rise in trans hate crime since last year, with most victims aged between 26–35".

In December 2018, it was reported that according to data from Freedom of Information responses received from 38 police forces across England, Scotland and Wales, Merseyside has the highest rate of recorded homophobic hate crimes.

In 2019, Matthew, 23, and his partner were ‘being affectionate’ at a bus stop in Brixton Road, Lambeth, on 19 January when they were assaulted in a homophobic attack. The gay couple feared they would go blind after being pepper sprayed in the face. Matthew recalled his attacker, who was with a group of four other men, say "we don’t want your kind around here".

In 2019, a lesbian couple, Melania Geymonat, 28, and Christine Hannigan, 29, were victims of a homophobic attack. They were harassed, assaulted and abused during the early morning of 30 May, on a London bus. Four teenage boys began harassing the pair after discovering their couplehood, proceeding to ask them to kiss, making sexual gestures, discussing sex positions, and throwing coins at the women. The scene escalated and both women were significantly beaten, first Christine, then Melania, along with having their belongings stolen. Both were later taken to hospital for facial injuries. Photos released show both women covered in their own blood. The four teenagers were arrested for the assault. London mayor Sadiq Khan and then-Labour Party leader Jeremy Corbyn both spoke out against the beating.

Hate crimes against transgender people in England, Scotland and Wales, as recorded by police, increased 81% from the 2016–17 fiscal year (1,073 crimes) to the 2018–19 fiscal year (1,944 crimes).

== 2020s ==
In 2021, David Iwo, 23, was given a life sentence for the murder of a 69-year-old retiree, former Crown Prosecution Service lawyer Martin Decker, with a hammer. He told detectives that it was "his life's work" to kill gay men until he was caught. Iwo advertised his services for sex online and tricked Decker into arranging a meeting at his flat in Vyner Croft, Prenton, on 6 March 2021.

In 2022, Lucy Hambley, 40, was given a seven-year prison sentence for sexually assaulting a 13-year-old boy she befriended. Hambley's motive was to convince the boy that he was straight, after he confined in her that he was gay.

In 2023, Brianna Ghey, a 16-year-old transgender girl, was stabbed to death in Culcheth on 11 February. The police described her murder as a "targeted attack". Two 15-year-olds, a boy and a girl, were charged with her murder. Prosecutor Leanne Gallagher said the attack on Ghey was "extremely brutal and punishing". Friends of Ghey said she was bullied at school because she was transgender, including being "gang beaten". Cheshire Police initially stated they had not found evidence to suggest Ghey's murder was a hate crime, but later said they were not eliminating any possibility from their investigation, including whether her murder was a hate crime. Some British media outlets were criticised for their coverage, in which they deadnamed and misgendered Ghey and failed to state that she was transgender. The trial of the two 15-year-olds charged with her murder began at Manchester Crown Court on 27 November 2023, and both were found guilty of her murder, receiving life sentences with a minimum term of 20 and 22 years respectively.

On 16 June 2023, drag queen and RuPaul's Drag Race UK winner, The Vivienne, was attacked in a McDonald's when a man made homophobic comments towards her and then punched her in the face. Alan Whitfield received a suspended sentence: a 12-week jail sentence, suspended for 18 months.

== See also ==
- LGBT rights in the United Kingdom
- List of people killed for being transgender
- Murder of Brianna Ghey
- Muslim patrol incidents in London
- Violence against transgender people
