= Birchwood Community High School =

Secondary school in Warrington, Cheshire, England

Location
- Brock Road; Birchwood; Warrington, Cheshire, WA3 7PT; England; 53.4166°N 2.52957°W

Information
- Type: Academy
- Motto: Aspiration Knowledge Kindness
- Established: 1985
- Department for Education URN: 139840 Tables
- Ofsted: Reports
- Chair: Andrea Atherton
- Headteacher: Emma Mills
- Gender: Coeducational
- Age: 11 to 19
- Capacity: 1130 Learners
- Houses: Fides; Libertas; Veneratio; Dedicatio
- Website: www.birchwoodhigh.org

Birchwood Community High School is a coeducational secondary school and sixth form with academy status, located in the Birchwood area of Warrington in the English county of Cheshire.

Previously a community school administered by Warrington Borough Council, Birchwood Community High School converted to academy status on 1 July 2013. However, the school continues to coordinate with Warrington Borough Council regarding its admissions.

Birchwood Community High School offers GCSEs and BTECs as programmes of study for pupils, while students in the sixth form (named Birchwood College) have the option to study from a range of A-levels and further BTECs.

The school has four houses: Fides, Libertas, Veneratio and Dedicatio – the Latin names of the school's values of belief, independence, respect and commitment.

== History ==
Birchwood Community High School was opened in September 1985. Birchwood has grown from 180 pupils and 14 staff in 1985 to 1016 pupils and over 200 staff in 2021.

== Notable former pupils ==
- David Brooks, footballer
- Josh Brownhill, footballer
- James Chester, footballer
- Brianna Ghey, murdered
- Stephen Jordan, footballer
- George Sampson, actor and dancer
- Jordan Thorniley, footballer
