= Culcheth High School =

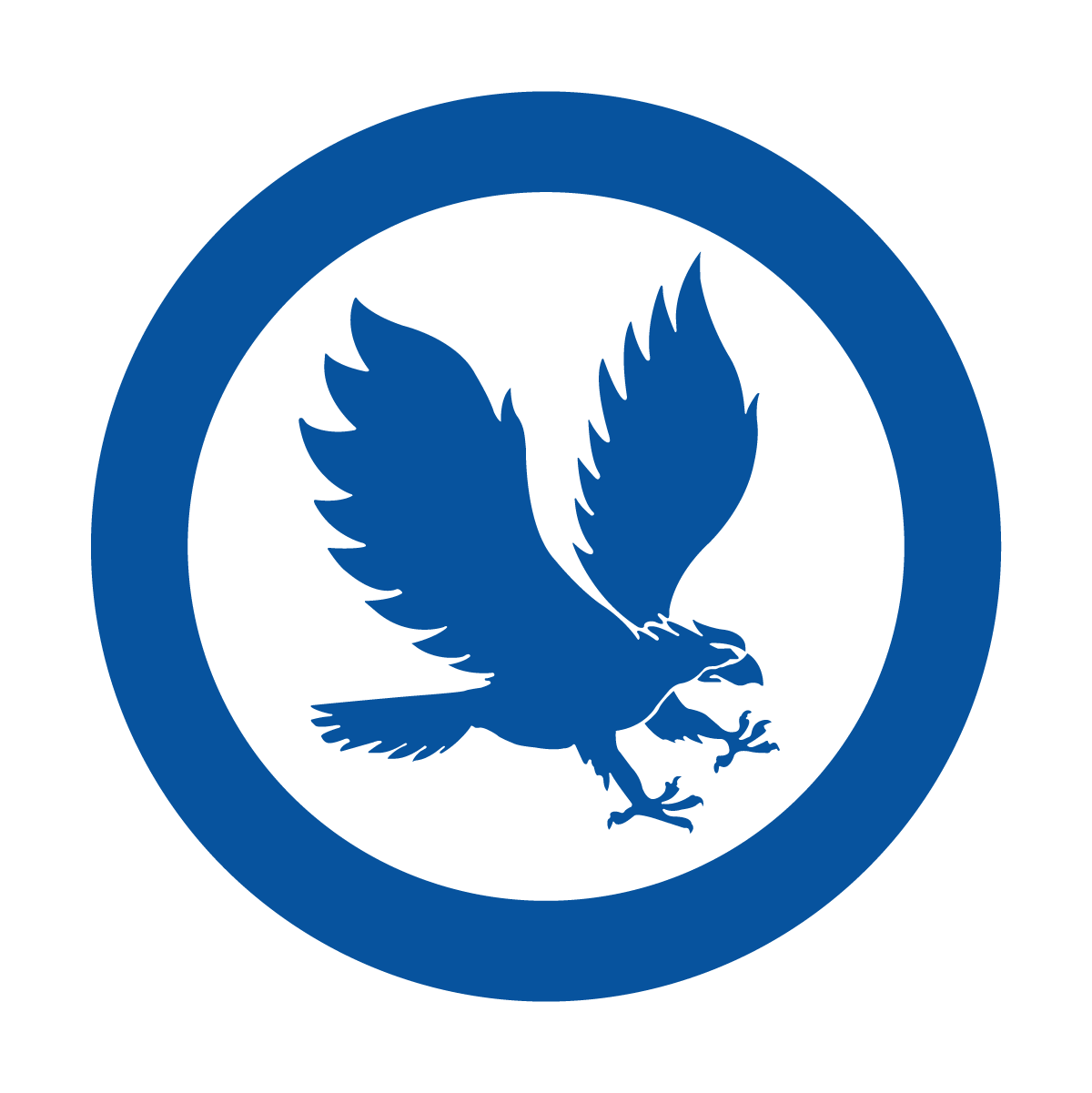

Location
- Warrington Road; Culcheth, Cheshire, WA3 5HH; United Kingdom; 53.455375°N 2.507593°W

Information
- Type: Community school
- Motto: To be the Best That We Can Be
- Established: 1931
- Local authority: Warrington
- Department for Education URN: 111430 Tables
- Ofsted: Reports
- Headteacher: Chris Hunt
- Gender: Mixed
- Age: 11 to 16
- Website: www.culchethhigh.org.uk

Culcheth High School is a community school for students aged 11–16, located in Warrington, Cheshire. It serves many of the surrounding areas with a student base of over 1,000 students. In 2010, it opened a new £28,000,000 campus, combining the High School and Community Campus in one building.

== Location ==
Culcheth High School is located in Culcheth, a large village in Cheshire approximately 6 miles (10 km) north-east of Warrington, England. Historically it lay within the County of Lancashire. It is the principal settlement in Culcheth and Glazebury civil parish.

== History ==
=== Blocks ===
When the school first opened in 1931 it was a single block, formerly known as 'A Block'. Over the years several other blocks were opened as the school expanded. The most recent block built was 'G Block'.

In 2010 when the new school campus was completed, all but one block of the old school was demolished, G block. G Block went up for sale with the intent for use as a community building.

Now the school has four blocks named after historical figures: S Block (William Shakespeare), K Block (Martin Luther King Jr.), C Block (Marie Curie) & B Block (Isambard Kingdom Brunel).

== Facilities ==
The school has facilities for teaching and recording music, with two suites of electronic instruments linked up to mac minis and a recording studio. For sports the school has: a large multi-use sports hall; an activity studio for use with dance/gym/trampolines; an AstroTurf pitch for all year round football and several rugby pitches and cricket strip. Science labs, technology suites, and ICT rooms are at all levels in the school, which operates a full wireless network for laptops in each department and interactive ICT resources in every classroom. An open-plan restaurant and a cafe are on the ground level.

Being a community campus, the school has a gym and several community rooms which can be hired out by local groups and the community.

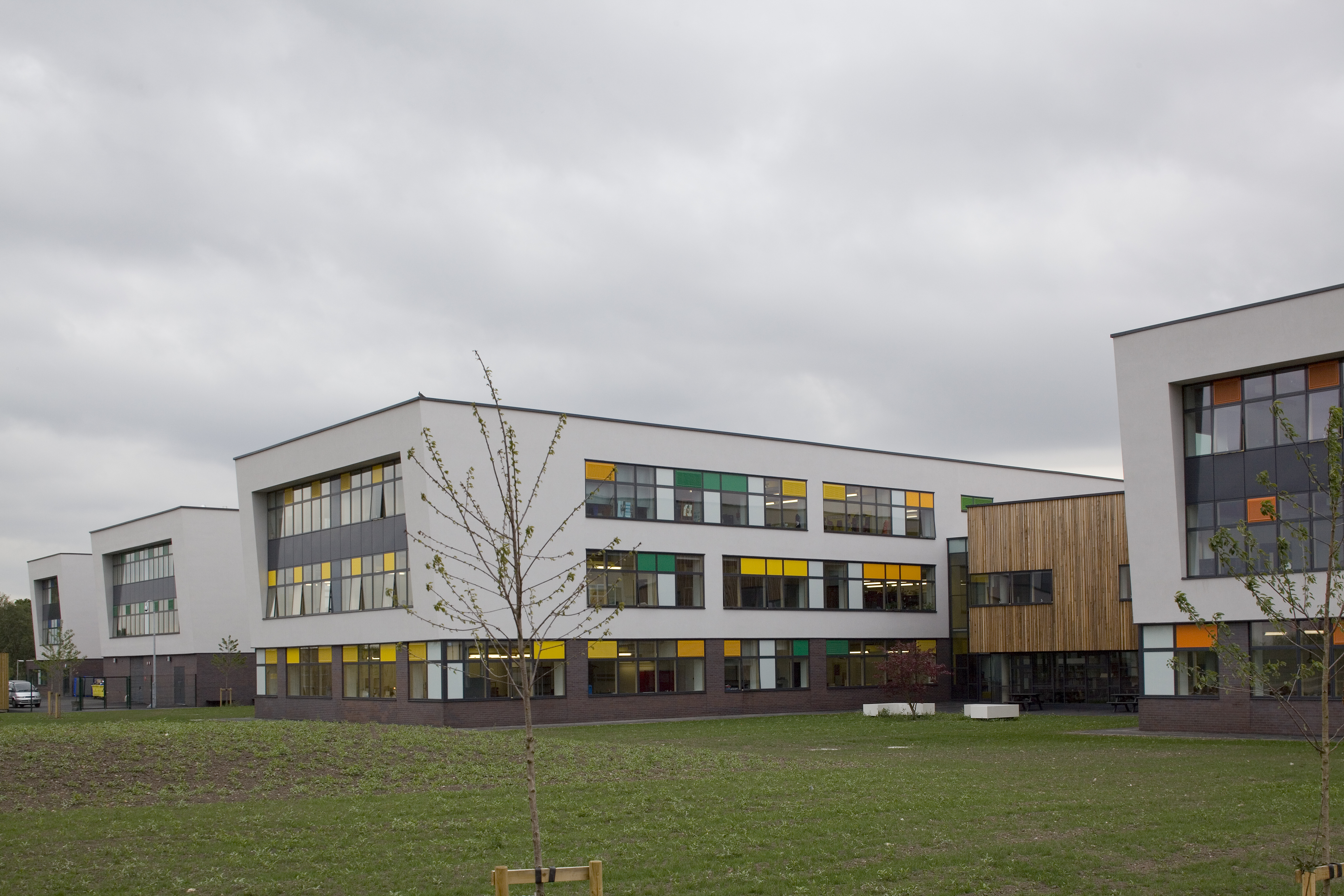
Culcheth High School Campus

== Sixth Form ==
The sixth form closed at the end of the 2013/14 academic year. In the 2013–2014 academic year there were only 54 students who attended the sixth form.

== Notable former pupils ==
- Michael Lundy, retired United States Army lieutenant general.
- Daniel Ryan, actor (The Bay, Dear England)
- Michelle Scutt, former Olympic runner.
